= Mount Giles =

Mountain in Northern Territory, Australia

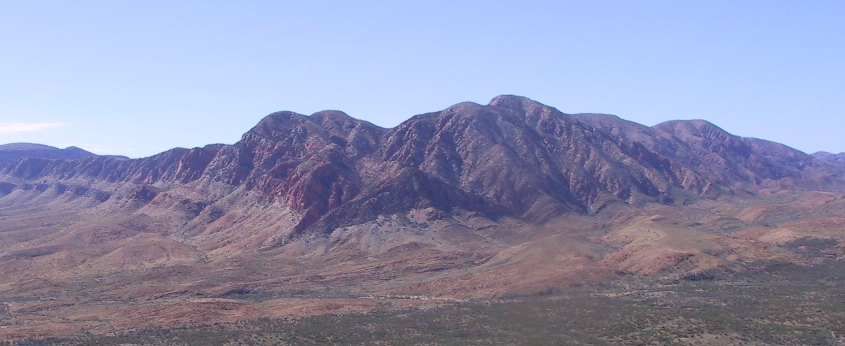
- Mount Giles from the opposite side of Ormiston Pound in the south

Highest point
- Elevation: 1,389 m (4,557 ft)AHD
- Coordinates: 23°37′44″S 132°51′42″E

Geography
- Location within Northern Territory
- Location: Northern Territory, Australia
- Parent range: MacDonnell Ranges

Climbing
- Easiest route: Larapinta Trail

Mount Giles is the third highest mountain in the Northern Territory, Australia, at 1,389 metres (4,557 ft) AHD. The mountain is named after Australian explorer Ernest Giles. It lies along the MacDonnell Ranges, dominating Ormiston Pound, in the West MacDonnell National Park, approximately 80 kilometres (50 mi) west of Alice Springs. It can be visited via the celebrated Larapinta Trail and has views of Mount Sonder, Ormiston Gorge and Pound, and the surrounding range.

== See also ==
- List of mountains in Australia
