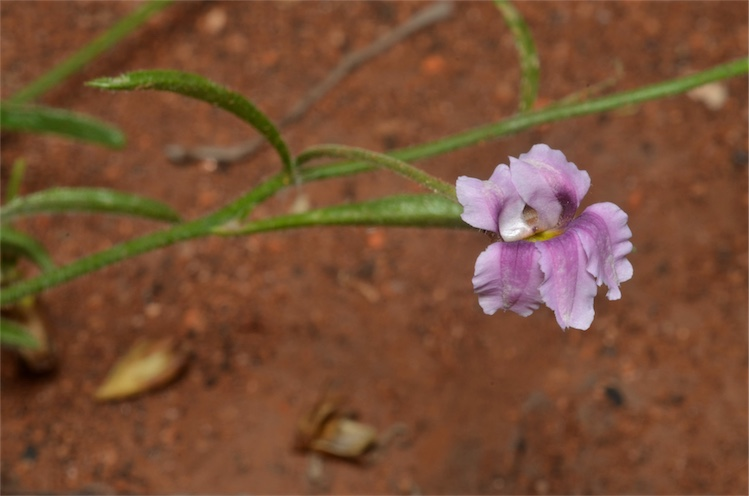

Scientific classification
- Kingdom: Plantae
- Clade: Tracheophytes
- Clade: Angiosperms
- Clade: Eudicots
- Clade: Asterids
- Order: Asterales
- Family: Goodeniaceae
- Genus: Goodenia
- Species: G. vilmoriniae

Binomial name
- Goodenia vilmoriniae F.Muell.

= Goodenia vilmoriniae =

Species of flowering plant

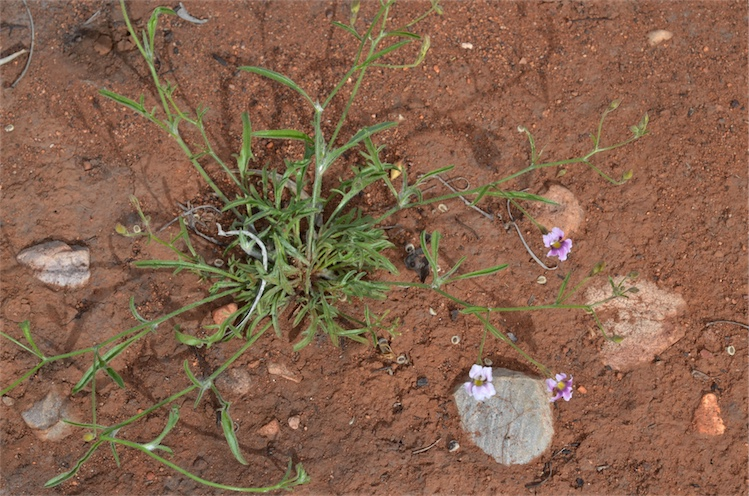
Habit near Ochre Pits in the MacDonnell Ranges

Goodenia vilmoriniae is a species of flowering plant in the family Goodeniaceae and is endemic to arid areas of Central Australia. It is an ascending to erect annual herb with linear to lance-shaped leaves at the base of the plant, and racemes of pale blue to lilac flowers.

== Description ==
Goodenia vilmoriniae is an ascending to erect annual herb that typically grows to a height of up to 40 cm (16 in) with woolly and glandular hairs. The leaves at the base of the plant are linear to lance-shaped, 40–100 mm (1.6–3.9 in) long and 3–8 mm (0.12–0.31 in) wide, sometimes with lobes and sometimes teeth on the edges. The flowers are arranged in racemes up to 100 mm (3.9 in) long with leaf-like bracts, each flower on a pedicel 10–35 mm (0.39–1.38 in) long. The corolla is pale blue to lilac, the lower lobes 6.5–8.5 mm (0.26–0.33 in) long with wings about 2 mm (0.079 in) wide. Flowering mainly occurs from April to September.

== Taxonomy and naming ==
Goodenia vilmoriniae was first formally described in 1862 by Ferdinand von Mueller in Fragmenta phytographiae Australiae from specimens collected by John McDouall Stuart. The specific epithet (vilmoriniae) honours "Madame Vilmorin of Paris".

== Distribution ==
This goodenia grows on rocky or gravelly hills, on sandplains and near ephemeral creeks, in arid scrub and hummock grassland in arid regions of central Western Australia, far northern South Australia, the Northern Territory and Queensland.

== Conservation status ==
Goodenia vilmoriniae is classified as "not threatened" by the Government of Western Australia Department of Parks and Wildlife.
