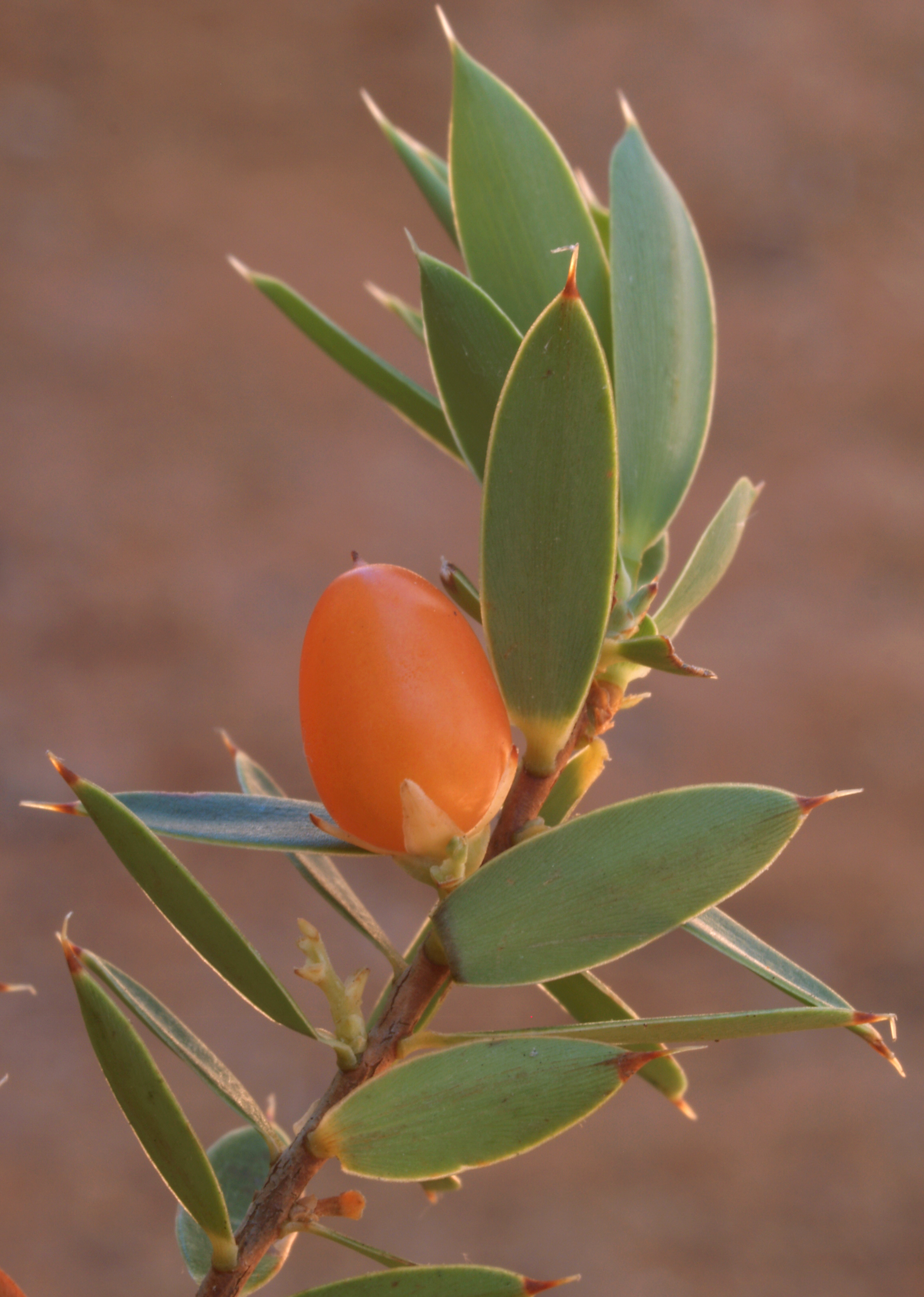

Scientific classification
- Kingdom: Plantae
- Clade: Tracheophytes
- Clade: Angiosperms
- Clade: Eudicots
- Clade: Asterids
- Order: Ericales
- Family: Ericaceae
- Genus: Styphelia
- Species: S. sonderensis

Binomial name
- Styphelia sonderensis (J.H.Willis) Hislop, Crayn & Puente-Lel.
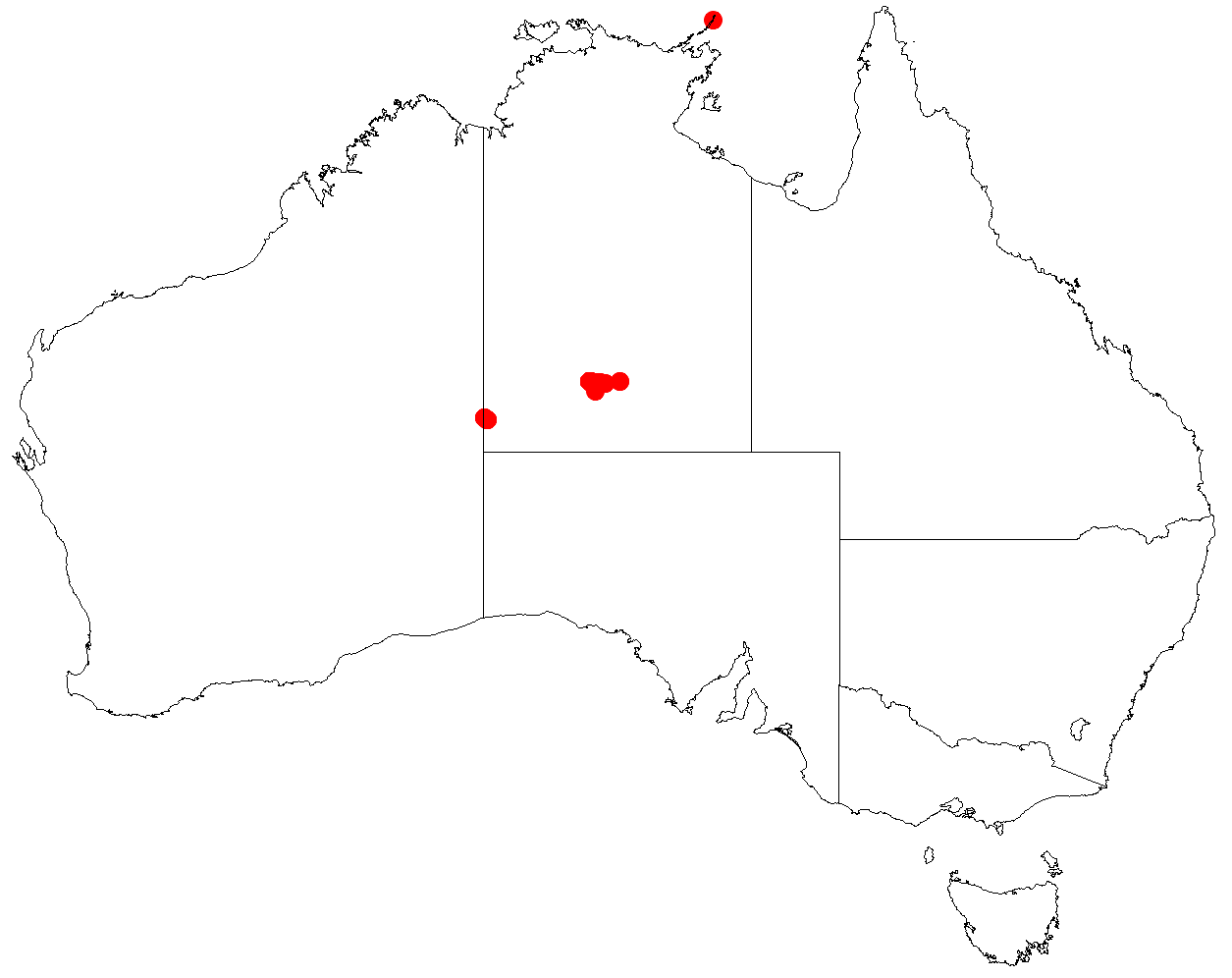
- Occurrence data from AVH

Synonyms
- Leucopogon sonderensis J.H.Willis

= Styphelia sonderensis =

Species of plant

Styphelia sonderensis, commonly known as Mount Sonder beard-heath, is a species of flowering plant in the heath family Ericaceae and is endemic to the south of the Northern Territory. It is a slender, erect or spreading shrub with elliptic leaves and white flowers arranged singly in leaf axils near the ends of branches.

== Description ==
Styphelia sonderensis is a slender erect or spreading shrub that typically grows to a height of up to 2 m (6 ft 7 in) high. The leaves are widely spreading to almost overlapping, elliptic egg-shaped, 10–15 mm (0.39–0.59 in) long and 2.5–4.0 mm (0.098–0.157 in) wide on short petiole and with a fine, sharp point on the tip. Both surfaces of the leaves are glabrous, the lower surface with spreading veins. The flowers are mostly arranged singly in leaf axils near the ends of branches, each flower on a pedicel 1–2 mm (0.039–0.079 in) long. The sepals are 4–5 mm (0.16–0.20 in) long, with five broadly egg-shaped bracts at the base. The petals are greenish white and 7–10 mm (0.28–0.39 in) long and about twice as long as the sepals, the lobes about 3 mm (0.12 in) long with a few short hairs on the inner surface. Flowering occurs in most months and the fruit is an oval, crimson drupe about 6 mm (0.24 in) long.

== Taxonomy and naming ==
This species was first formally described in 1975 by James Hamlyn Willis who gave it the name Leucopogon sonderensis in the journal Muelleria from specimens he collected on Mount Sonder in 1966. In 2020, Michael Hislop, Darren Crayn and Caroline Puente-Lelievre transferred the species to Styphelia as S. sonderensis in Australian Systematic Botany.

== Distribution and habitat ==
Mount Sonder beard-heath grows on rocky ranges, usually at higher altitudes in the Central and MacDonnell Ranges in the south of the Northern Territory.
