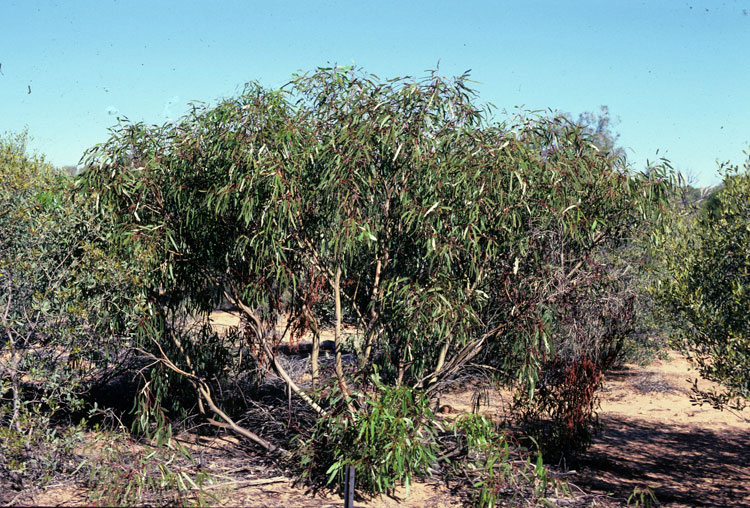
- Eucalyptus lucens near Hermannsburg, Northern Territory

Conservation status
- Priority One — Poorly Known Taxa (DEC)

Scientific classification
- Kingdom: Plantae
- Clade: Tracheophytes
- Clade: Angiosperms
- Clade: Eudicots
- Clade: Rosids
- Order: Myrtales
- Family: Myrtaceae
- Genus: Eucalyptus
- Species: E. lucens

Binomial name
- Eucalyptus lucens Brooker & Dunlop

= Eucalyptus lucens =

Shiny-leaved mallee.jpg

Species of eucalyptus

Eucalyptus lucens, commonly known as the shiny-leaved mallee, is a species of mallee that is endemic to northwestern Australia. It has small, pale greyish to brown bark, glistening, lance-shaped adult leaves, flower buds in groups of seven on a branching peduncle, creamy white flowers and conical fruit.

== Description ==
Eucalyptus lucens is a mallee that typically grows to a height of 1–3 m (3 ft 3 in – 9 ft 10 in) but sometimes as high as 5 m (16 ft), and forms a lignotuber. It has smooth pale grey to brownish bark, but often with some rough, fibrous or flaky bark near the base. Young plants and coppice regrowth have lance-shaped leaves arranged alternately, 8–10 mm (0.31–0.39 in) long and 15–20 mm (0.59–0.79 in) wide. Adult leaves are the same shade of glossy green on both sides, lance-shaped, 80–120 mm (3.1–4.7 in) long and 10–15 mm (0.39–0.59 in) wide, tapering to a petiole 10–15 mm (0.39–0.59 in) long. The flowers are mostly arranged on the ends of the branches in groups of seven on a thin, branching peduncle 3–10 mm (0.12–0.39 in) long, the individual buds on pedicels 3–10 mm (0.12–0.39 in) long. Flowering occurs between December and March and the flowers are creamy white. The fruit is a woody, conical capsule 4–6 mm (0.16–0.24 in) long and wide with the valves near rim level.

This eucalypt is a comparatively rare species but is conspicuous due to its glistening leaves, contrasting with those of the few other eucalypts growing in similar areas.

== Taxonomy and naming ==
Eucalyptus lucens was first formally described in 1978 by Ian Brooker and Clyde Dunlop from a specimen collected by Dunlop on Mount Sonder in 1973. The description was published in the journal Australian Forest Research. The specific epithet (lucens) is a Latin word meaning "shining", "glistening" or "polished", referring to the shining leaves.

== Distribution and habitat ==
Shiny-leaved mallee grows in open shrubland on shallow soils on sandstone and quartzite hills, and is endemic to the ranges west of Alice Springs in the northern Territory.

== Conservation status ==
This mallee is classified as "Priority One" in Western Australia, by the Government of Western Australia Department of Parks and Wildlife, meaning that it is known from only one or a few locations which are potentially at risk.

== See also ==
- List of Eucalyptus species
