= Spinifex grass =

Spinifex grass is a name which has been applied to two genera of grasses:

- Spinifex (coastal grass), a genus of grass which is indigenous to the coastal areas of Australasia and Indonesia
- Triodia (plant), a hummock grass of arid Australia, covering twenty percent of the Australian continent (although not in the genus Spinifex, it is the grass most commonly referred to as "spinifex")
  - Spinifex resin, obtained from species of Triodia, not Spinifex
