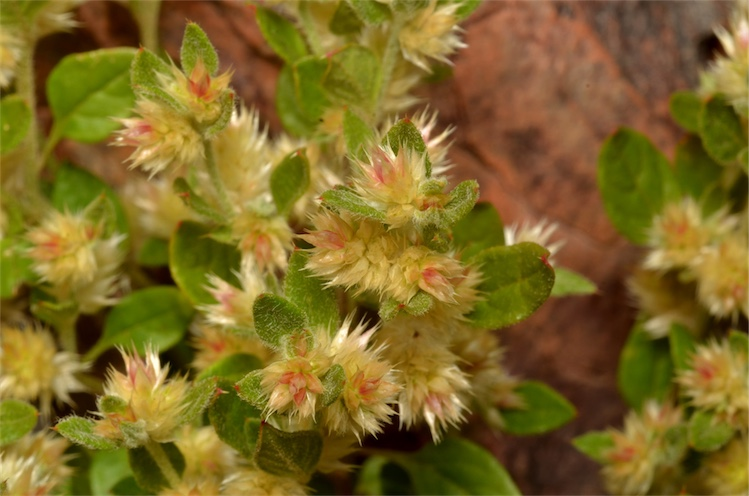

Scientific classification
- Kingdom: Plantae
- Clade: Tracheophytes
- Clade: Angiosperms
- Clade: Eudicots
- Order: Caryophyllales
- Family: Amaranthaceae
- Genus: Ptilotus
- Species: P. decipiens

Binomial name
- Ptilotus decipiens (Benth.) C.A.Gardner

Synonyms
- Alternanthera decipiens Benth.; Ptilotus hoodii F.Muell.; Trichinium hoodii F.Muell. nom. inval., pro syn.

= Ptilotus decipiens =

Species of grass-like plant

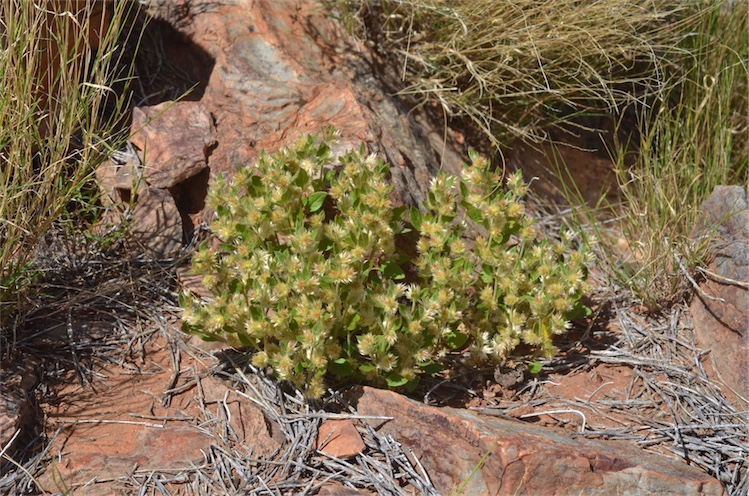
Habit near Serpentine Gorge

Ptilotus decipiens, commonly known as false mulla mulla, is a species of flowering plant in the family Amaranthaceae and is endemic to inland areas of Australia. It is a dense annual plant or short-lived perennial herb with hairy, elliptic to four-sided or egg-shaped stem leaves, and short, densely packed spikes of whitish flowers.

== Description ==
Ptilotus decipiens is a dense, annual or short-lived perennial herb with many stems, that typically grows to a height of 20 cm (7.9 in) and has stems and leaves that become glabrous with age. The stem leaves are elliptic, four-sided or egg-shaped, 8–35 mm (0.31–1.38 in) long and 5–19 mm (0.20–0.75 in) long, and there are no leaves at the base of the plant. The flower spikes are short, egg-shaped or cylindrical, up to about 25 mm (0.98 in) long and 5–12 mm (0.20–0.47 in) wide and densely packed with whitish flowers with colourless bracts and bracteoles with a prominent midrib. The outer tepals are 3.4–4.5 mm (0.13–0.18 in) longer and the inner tepals 2.5–3.6 mm (0.098–0.142 in) long and there are five fertile stamens.

== Taxonomy ==
This species was first formally described in 1870 by George Bentham who gave it the name Alternanthera decipiens in his Flora Australiensis from specimens collected in Queensland. In 1934, Charles Gardner changed the name Ptilotus decipiens in Enumeratio plantarum Australiae occidentalis. The specific epithet (decipiens) means 'deceiving', alluding to the plant's not looking like other species of "Ptilotus".

== Distribution and habitat ==
Ptilotus decipiens grows on rocky or gravelly hills in the Central Ranges, Great Sandy Desert, Pilbara and Tanami bioregions of Western Australia, the southern half of the Northern Territory in South Australia and in Queensland.

== Conservation status ==
Ptilotus decipiens is listed as of "least concern" by the Queensland Government Nature Conservation Act 1992.

== See also ==
- List of Ptilotus species
