= Acacia minutifolia =

Scientific classification
- Kingdom: Plantae
- Clade: Tracheophytes
- Clade: Angiosperms
- Clade: Eudicots
- Clade: Rosids
- Order: Fabales
- Family: Fabaceae
- Subfamily: Caesalpinioideae
- Clade: Mimosoid clade
- Genus: Acacia
- Species: A. minutifolia

Binomial name
- Acacia minutifolia F.Muell.
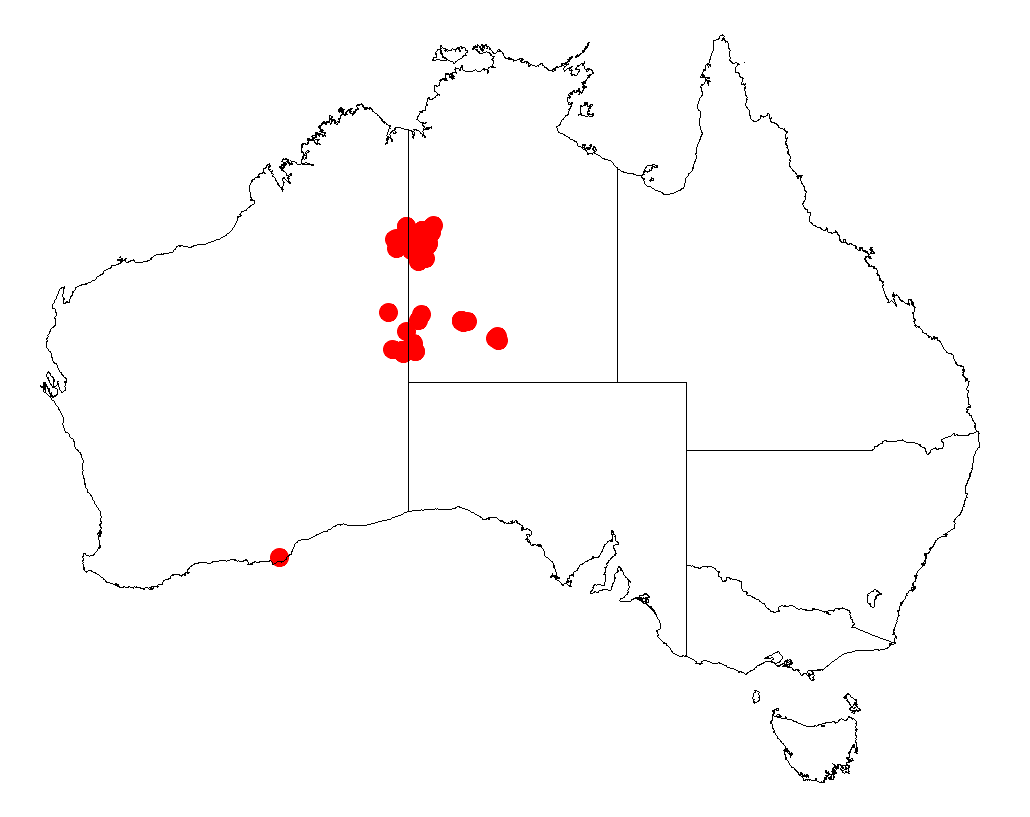
- Occurrence data from AVH

Synonyms
- Racosperma minutifolium (F.Muell.) Pedley

Species of legume

Acacia minutifolia, commonly known as the small-leaved flying-saucer bush, is a species of flowering plant in the family Fabaceae, and is endemic to inland Australia. It is a spreading, resinous shrub with thick, leathery phyllodes arranged in small bundles, spherical heads of yellow or pale yellow flowers, and linear, sticky, woody pods.

== Description ==
Acacia minutifolia is a spreading, resinous shrub that typically grows to a height of 0.3–1 m (1 ft 0 in – 3 ft 3 in) and 1.0–1.5 mm (0.039–0.059 in) wide and has smooth bark at first, later pale grey-brown and longitudinally fissured. Its branchlets are angular towards the end, hairy and scurfy. The phyllodes are arranged in bundles of three or four, s-shaped and leathery, 1.2–3.1 mm (0.047–0.122 in) long, 0.5–1.1 mm (0.020–0.043 in) wide, with inconspicuous veins and no pulvinus. The flowers are yellow or pale yellow and borne in spherical heads about 5–9 mm (0.20–0.35 in) in diameter on a hairy peduncle 5–12 mm (0.20–0.47 in) long. Flowering occurs from April to August, and the pods are flat, linear, 30–75 mm (1.2–3.0 in) long, 3.5–7.5 mm (0.14–0.30 in) wide, woody and sticky with thick seed partitions. The seeds are narrowly elliptic, 3–5 mm (0.12–0.20 in) long with a narrowly conical aril.

== Taxonomy ==
Acacia minutifolia was first formally described in 1874 by Ferdinand von Mueller in his Fragmenta Phytographiae Australiae from specimens collected in the MacDonnell Ranges by Ernest Giles. The specific epithet (minutifolia) means 'very small-leaved'.

== Distribution and habitat ==
Small-leaved flying-saucer bush grows in shallow red clay loam on stony plains and drainage areas, in Western Australia near the Northern Territory border between 20°S and 24°S, and in central western to central southern Northern Territory, in the Central Ranges, Great Sandy Desert, Tanami bioregions of Western Australia and the Central Ranges, Great Sandy Desert, MacDonnell Ranges and Tanami bioregions of the Northern Territory.

== See also ==
- List of Acacia species
