= Spinifex resin =

Grass resin traditionally used as an adhesive

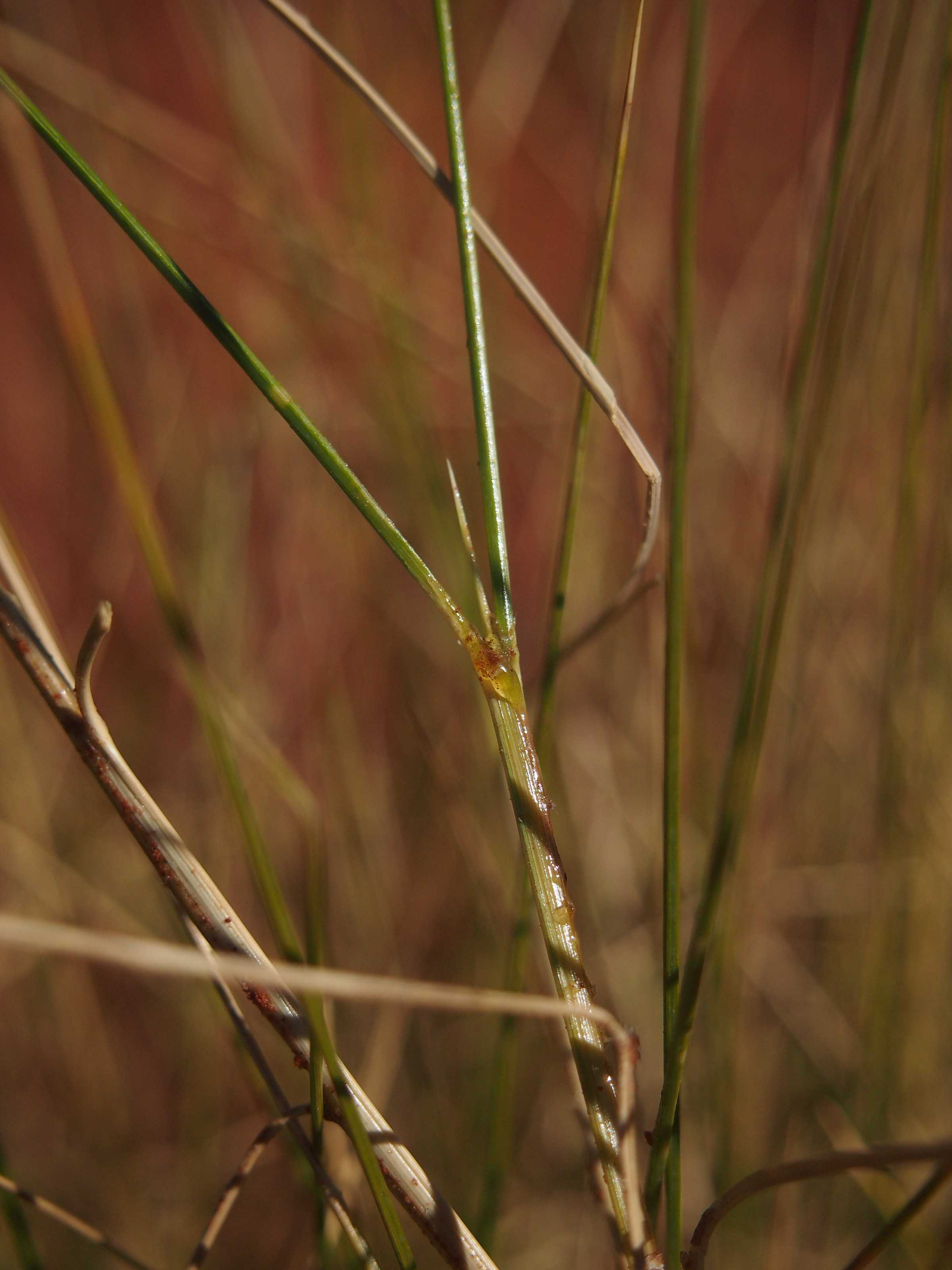
Triodia pungens stem showing resin coating and accumulation in leaf axils

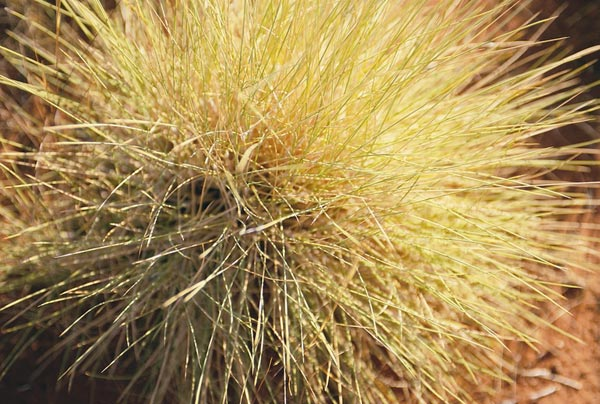
Spinifex (Triodia) plant

Spinifex resin is a gum coating of some species of spinifex grasses. This sticky resin was traditionally used as an adhesive in tool making by Aboriginal Australians. Many species of spinifex are extremely resinous, to the extent that resin may drip down the stems and leaves on hot days, and large residual lumps of resin often may be seen at the bases of hummocks which have burned.

== Making the gum ==
The spinifex is threshed until the resin particles fall free. These particles are heated until they fuse together to form a moldable black tar which is worked while warm. When set, this gum is quite strong.

The preparation of spinifex for hafting use is similar to that of Xanthorrhoea. It is thought to have been preferable to Xanthorrhoea for hafting, due to its ability to be re-heated and remodelled several times without going brittle. The resin can be re-softened using fire and some moisture.

Most historical accounts of resin processing described Aboriginal men doing the work; however, several factors suggest that women had a much more significant role in processing resin than the accounts suggest.

== Uses ==
Within traditional Aboriginal cultures, the known applications of spinifex resin divide into four broad categories:

1) As an adhesive. In areas where appropriate spinifex species grew, many hunting and working implements benefited from the use of spinifex gum or resin as a hafting adhesive:

- Spinifex resin was often a crucial ingredient in spear-making, being used to fasten the head onto the shaft. A man would always carry at least one spear, and normally a clump of resin so that repairs could be carried out on it and other utensils.
- The traditional Aboriginal axe also made strong use of spinifex resin.

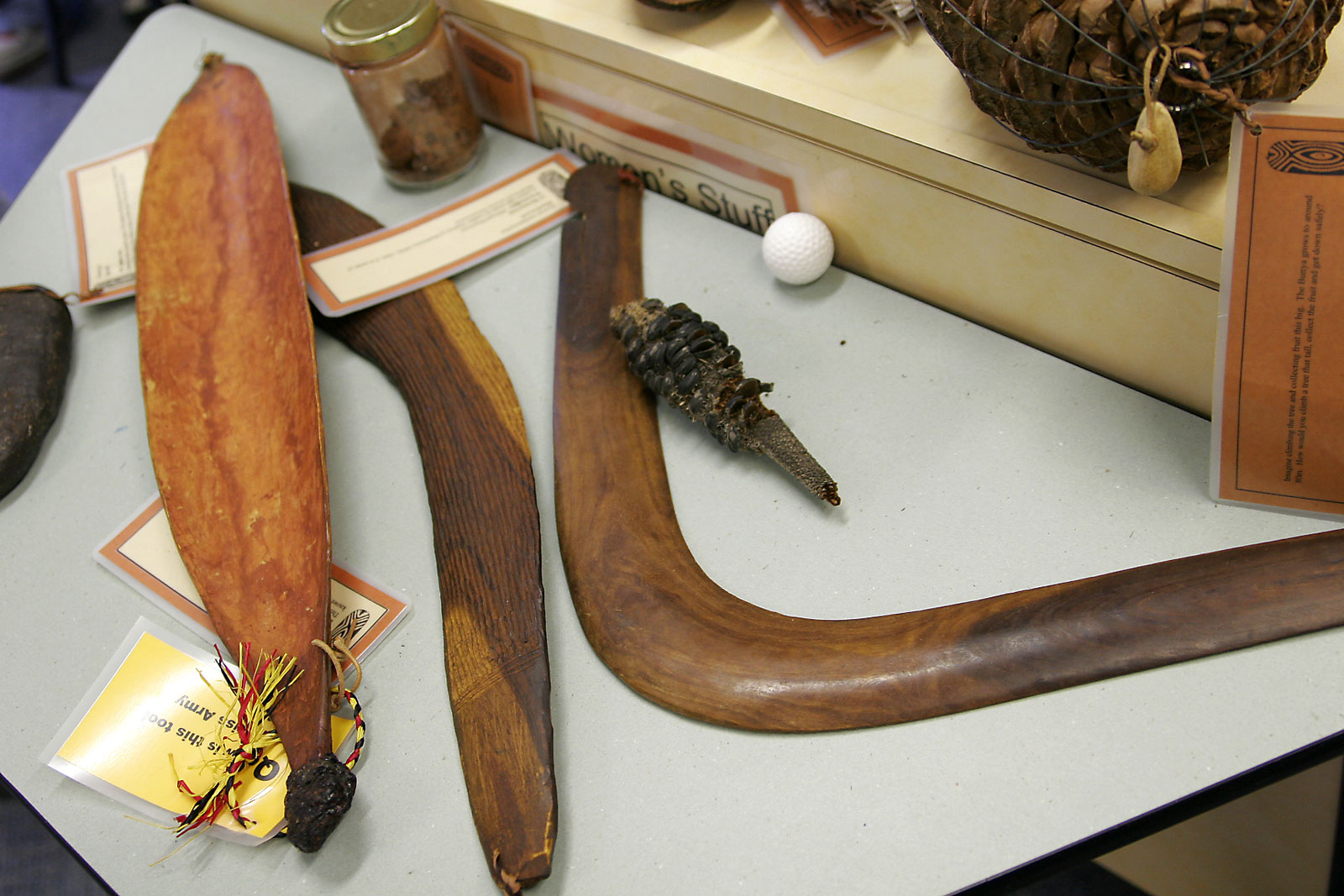
Woomera, at left. Note clump of spinifex resin at the base of the handle.

- The base of the woomera has a clump of this resin attached to it.
- The resin was also used as a binder when making paint with ochre.

2) To make items waterproof. Spinifex resin has been used to caulk wooden containers for carrying water.

3) To repair holes and cracks in wooden tools and containers.

4) To manipulate into beads, figurines, vessels and other miscellaneous objects.

In modern times, in true Bush Mechanics spirit, spinifex resin can also be melted to repair things like jerry cans for carrying water and fuel.

As of 2023, a Brisbane-based company has raised funds to develop medical gels from spinifex resin.
