= Redbank Gorge =

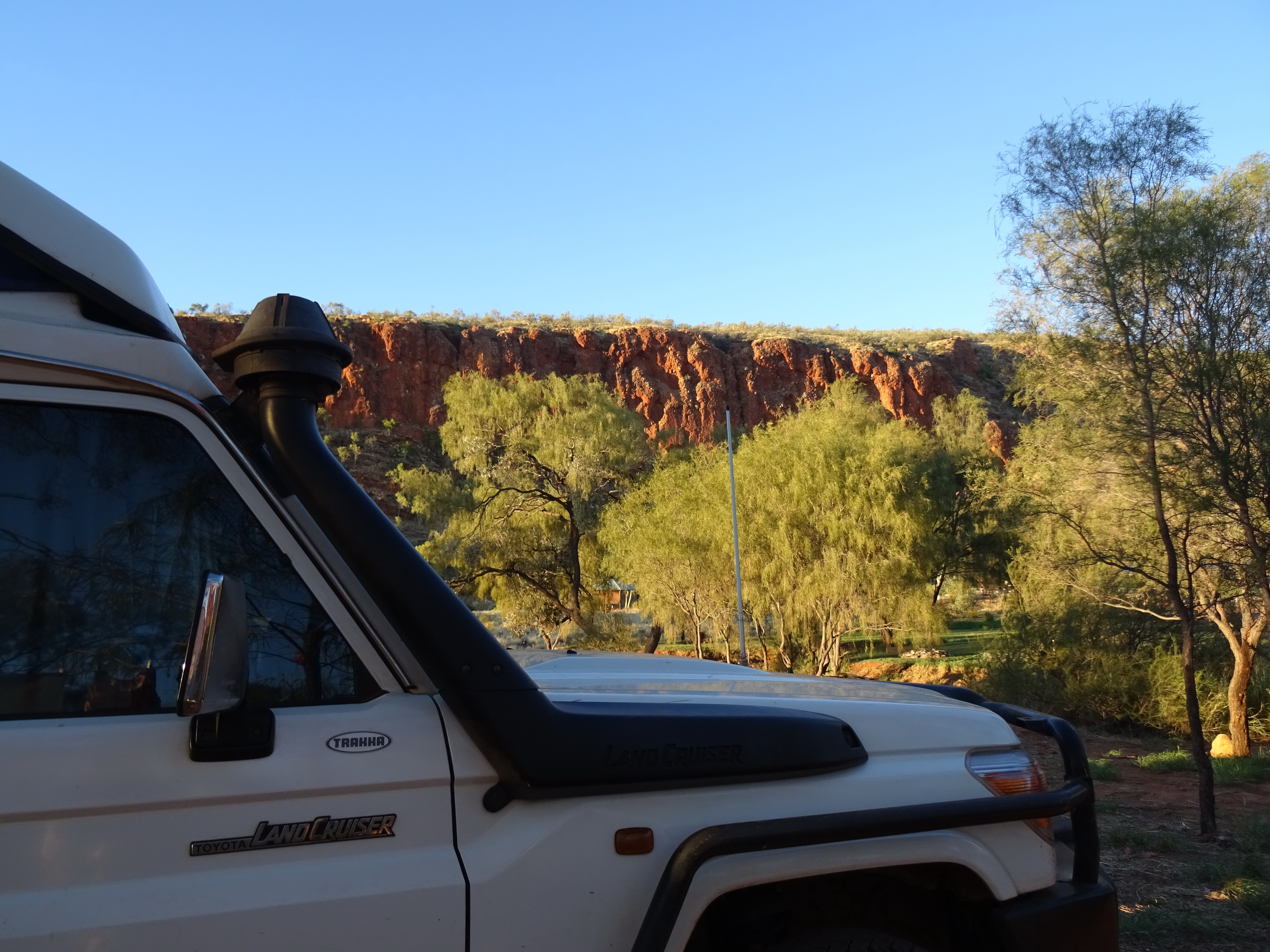
- View of Redbank Gorge from nearby road

Geography
- Country: Australia
- State: Northern Territory
- Locality: Mount Zeil
- Coordinates: 23°45′00″S 132°58′43″E
- Interactive map of Redbank Gorge

Redbank Gorge (Western Arrarnta: Rutjupma / roo-chip-ma), is a gorge located in the Northern Territory of Australia, 156 km west of Alice Springs. It is situated at the bottom of Mount Sonder. The gorge is part of the West MacDonnell National Park, which has an area of approximately 2,568 square kilometres (992 sq mi).

== Features ==
The area features camping facilities at the Woodland and Ridgetop campgrounds, which contain amenities such as a toilet and fire pit, however fees apply to use these locations. The gorges can be accessed from the nearby Larapinta and Namatjira drives.

An information board at the gorge's location on the Larapinta Trail.
