= Tjoritja / West MacDonnell National Park =

National park in the Northern Territory, Australia

- IUCN category II (national park)
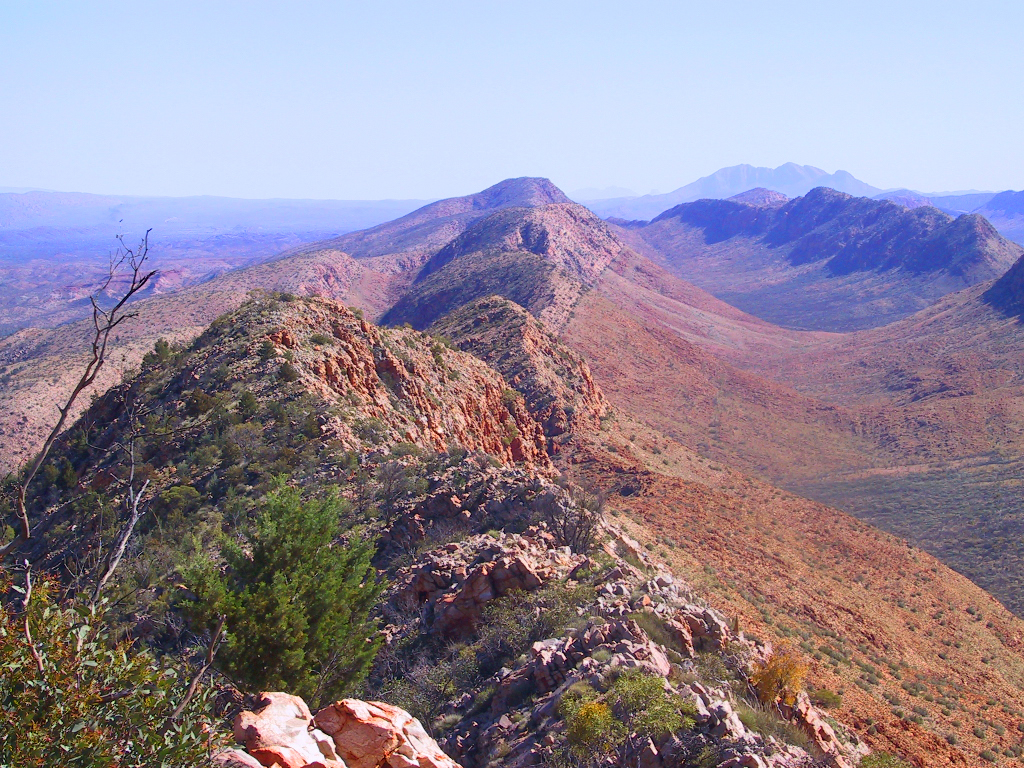
- View along the West MacDonnell Ranges from the Larapinta Trail, near Glen Helen

- Location within Northern Territory
- Location: Northern Territory
- Nearest city: Alice Springs
- Coordinates: 23°41′S 133°08′E
- Area: 2,568.61 km^{2} (991.75 sq mi)
- Established: 30 September 1992
- Governing body: Parks and Wildlife Commission of the Northern Territory
- Website: Official website

Tjoritja / West MacDonnell is a national park in the Northern Territory (Australia) due west of Alice Springs and 1234 km south of Darwin. It extends along the MacDonnell Ranges west of Alice Springs.

The popular extended walk, the Larapinta Trail, runs east–west along the linear park, following the West MacDonnell Ranges. The park includes many tourist attractions along its 250 kilometre length including Ormiston Pound, the Ellery Creek Bighole, Glen Helen Gorge, Simpsons Gap, Standley Chasm, Mount Sonder, Serpentine Gorge, the Ochre Pits and Redbank Gorge.

The Park is known as Tjoritja by the traditional owners of the land and is considered of great significance in the local Arrernte Aboriginal culture. It is home to several species of flora and fauna and is now utilised by people for a variety of recreational activities. Facilities at the park include swimming, camping, gas BBQ, bushwalking, caravan sites, etc.

Tjoritja / West MacDonnell National Park

== See also ==
- Protected areas of the Northern Territory
