= Ormiston Pound =

Ring of mountains in the Northern Territory of Australia

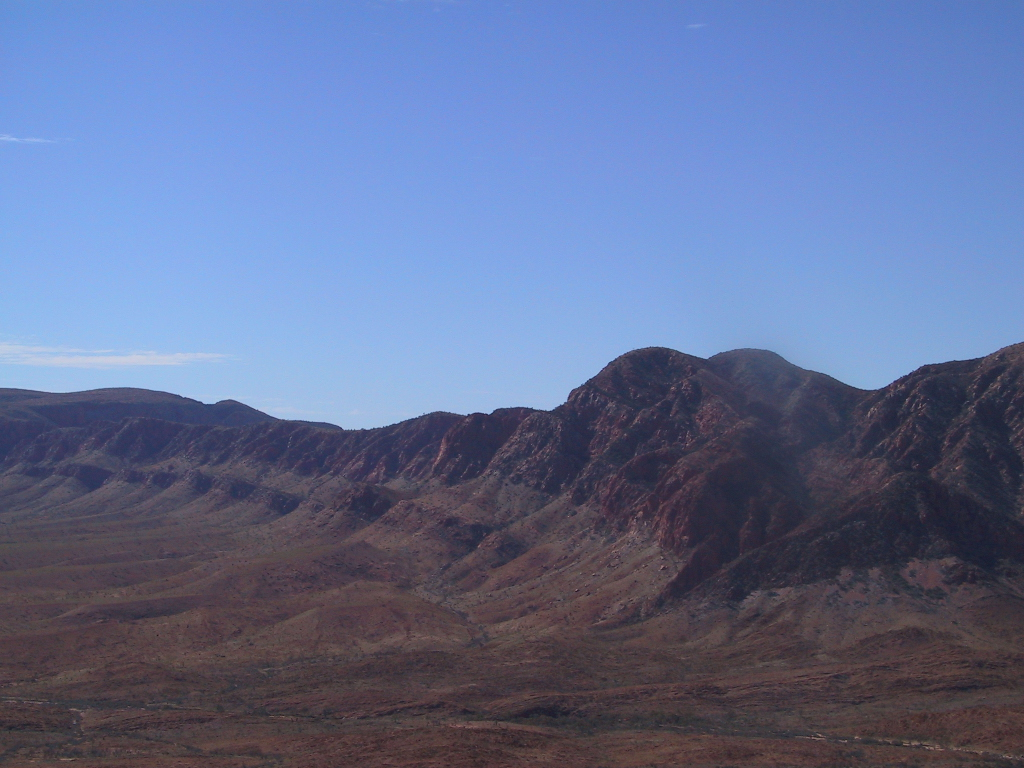
- The western half of Ormiston Pound with Mount Giles in the foreground

Geography
- Location within Northern Territory
- Location: Northern Territory, Australia
- Range coordinates: 23°37′30″S 132°48′00″E
- Parent range: MacDonnell Ranges

Ormiston Pound is a ring of mountains in the Northern Territory of Australia punctuating the MacDonnell Ranges, in the West MacDonnell National Park, approximately 135 kilometres (84 mi) west of Alice Springs. It lies at roughly the halfway point in the Larapinta Trail and has views from its circumference of Mount Sonder, Gosses Bluff crater and the surrounding range.

The Pound, a ring of mountains, is dominated by Mount Giles, which forms its eastern boundary. The western boundary is formed by the Ormiston Gorge, a popular tourist destination.

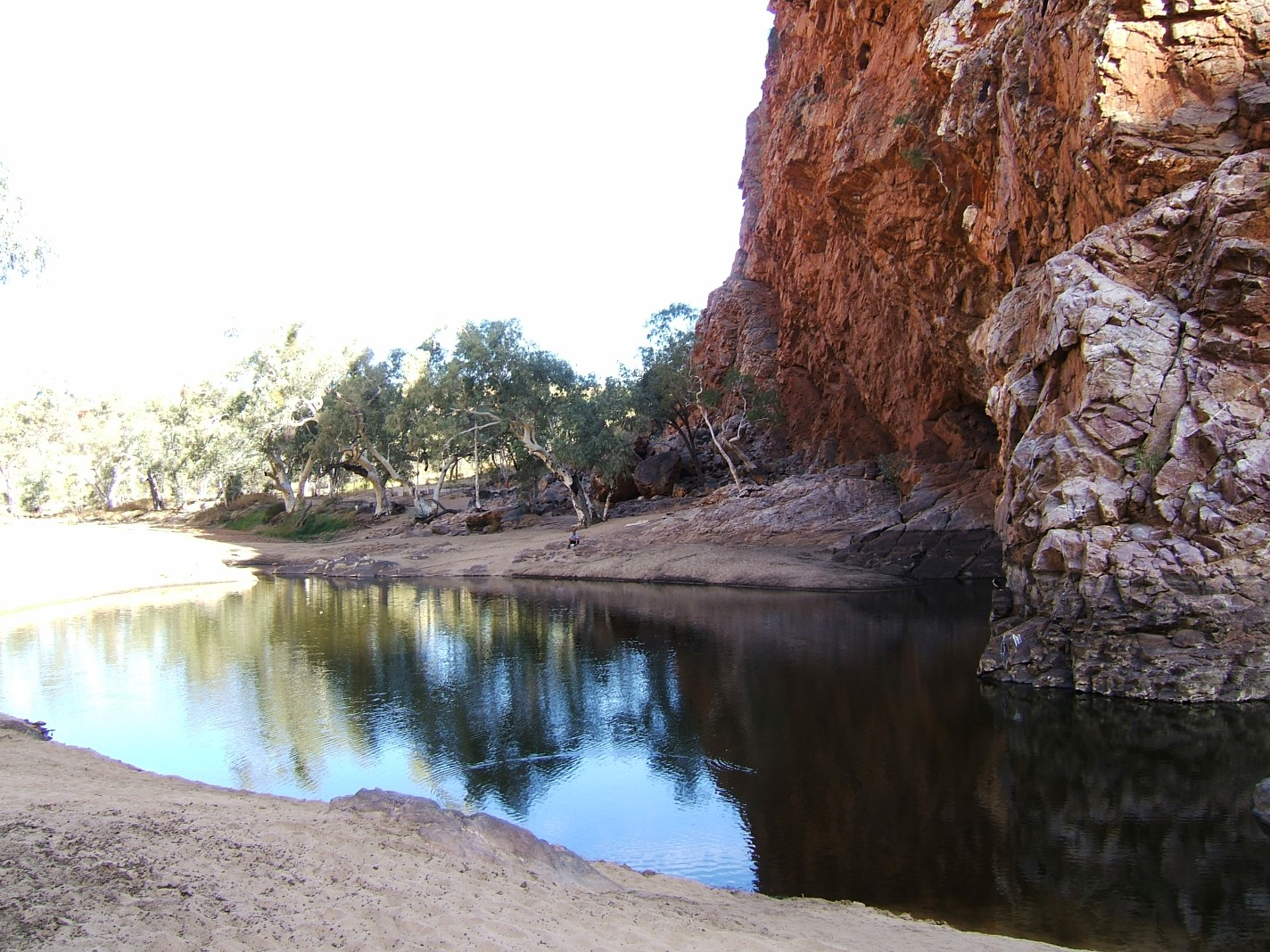
Ormiston Gorge Water Hole

The pound is accessible from a road in the west, which travels between Glen Helen and Alice Springs. There is a waterhole at the bottom near the gorge, as well as several lookouts. The entire pound covers 46.55 square kilometres (17.97 sq mi). The Finke River passes Ormiston Gorge in the west.

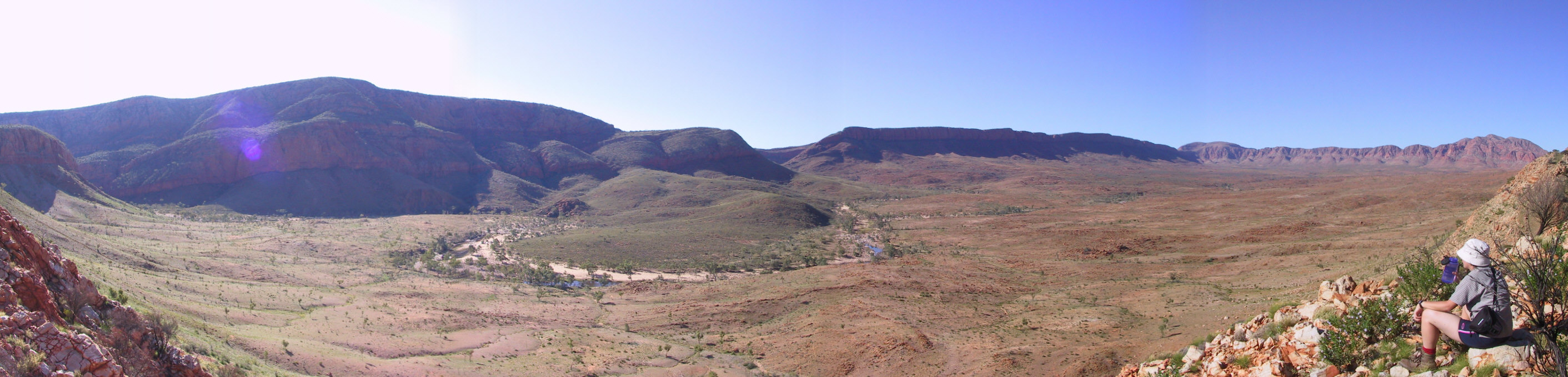
Ormiston Pound panorama

== See also ==
- West MacDonnell National Park
- Larapinta Trail
