= Simpsons Gap =

Gap in the West MacDonnell Ranges, Australia

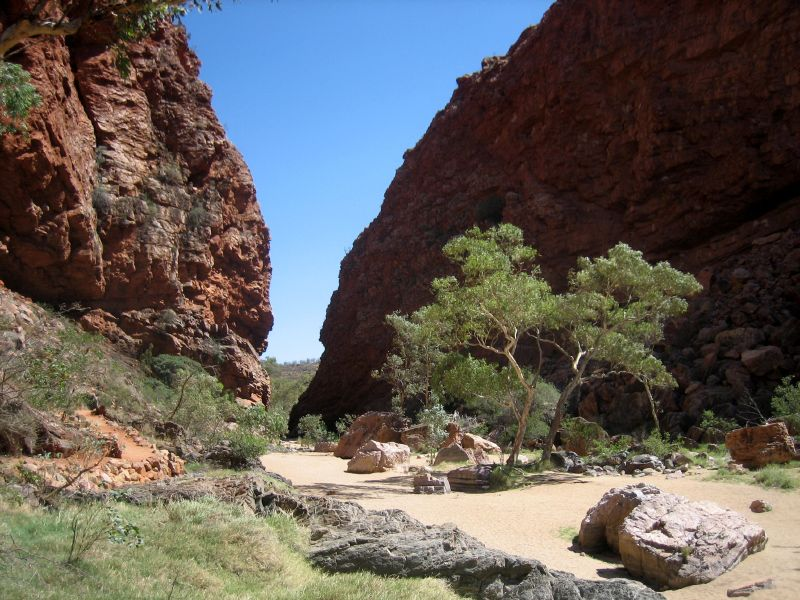
- Simpsons Gap in the West MacDonnell Ranges

- Location within Northern Territory

Third Approach
- Location: Burt Plain, Northern Territory
- Range: MacDonnell Ranges
- Coordinates: 23°40′32″S 133°43′07″E

Simpsons Gap (Arrernte: Rungutjirpa) is one of the gaps in the West MacDonnell Ranges in Australia's Northern Territory. It is located 18 kilometres west from Alice Springs, on the Larapinta Trail.

The gap is home to various plants and wildlife, including the black-footed rock-wallaby. It is the site of a permanent waterhole.

== History ==
Rungutjirpa is an important spiritual place for the Arrernte people, who have inhabited the Arrernte area since before European discovery. It was later visited by surveyor Gilbert Rotherdale McMinn in 1871 while he was searching for a better route for the Overland Telegraph Line.

== Tourism ==
Section 1 of the Larapinta Trail begins at Alice Springs Telegraph Station and ends at the waterhole at Rungutjirpa.

== Gallery ==
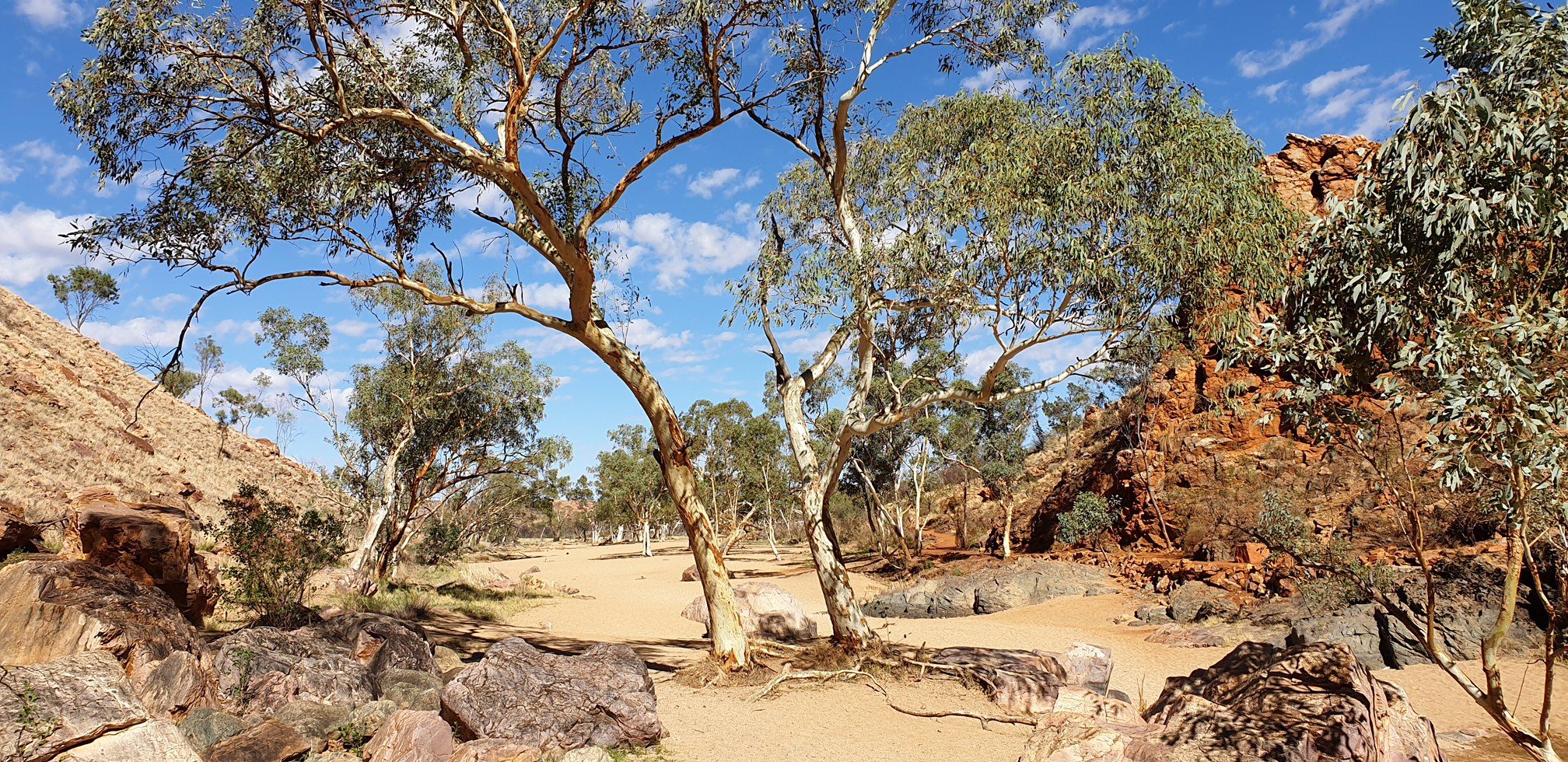
Leaving Simpsons Gap

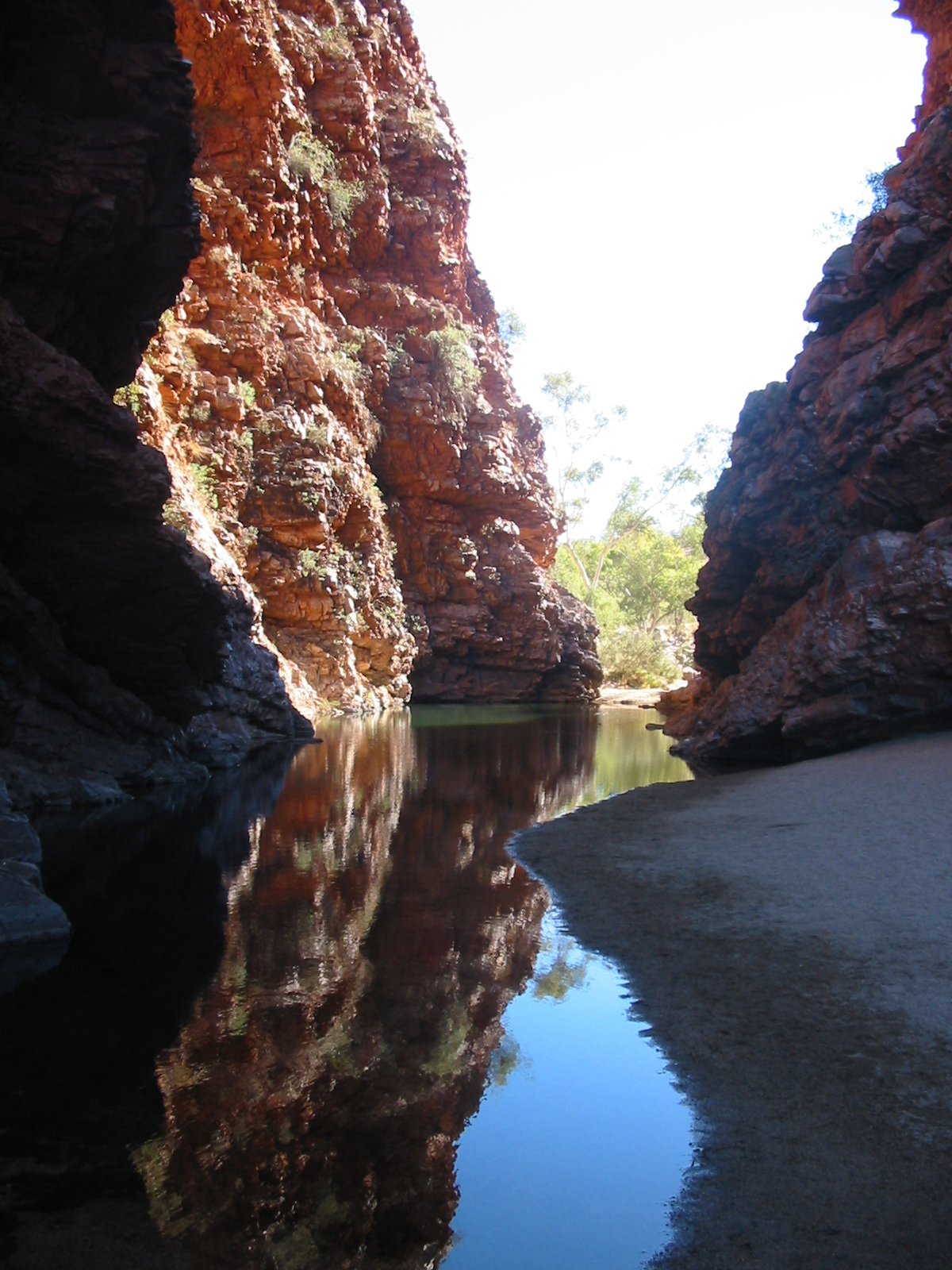
Waterhole at Rungutjirpa

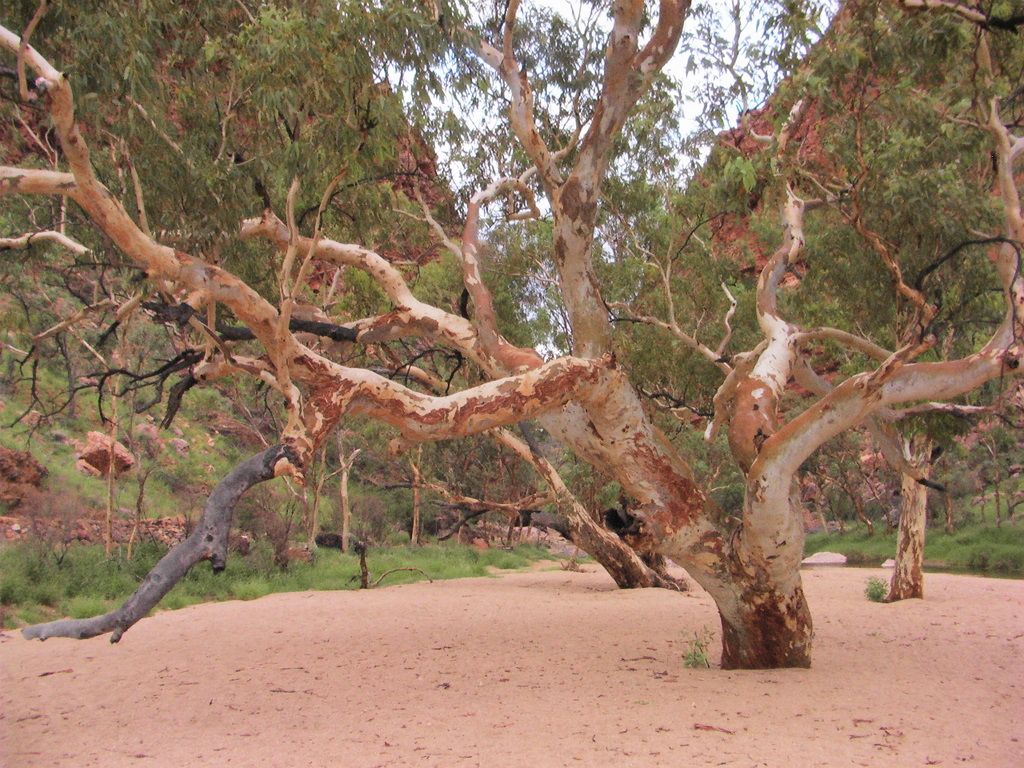
Gum at Simpsons Gap

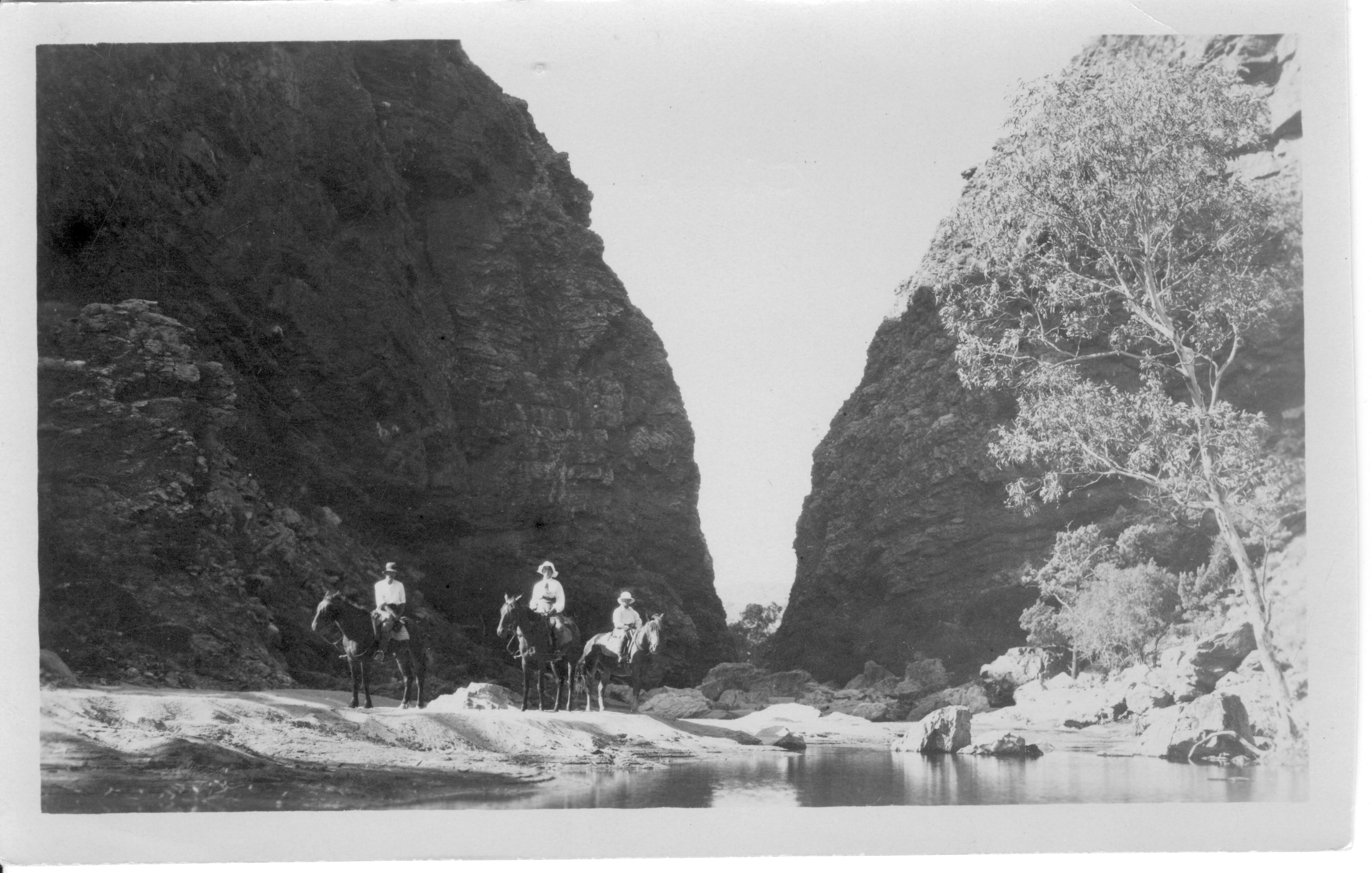
Simpons Gap, date unknown

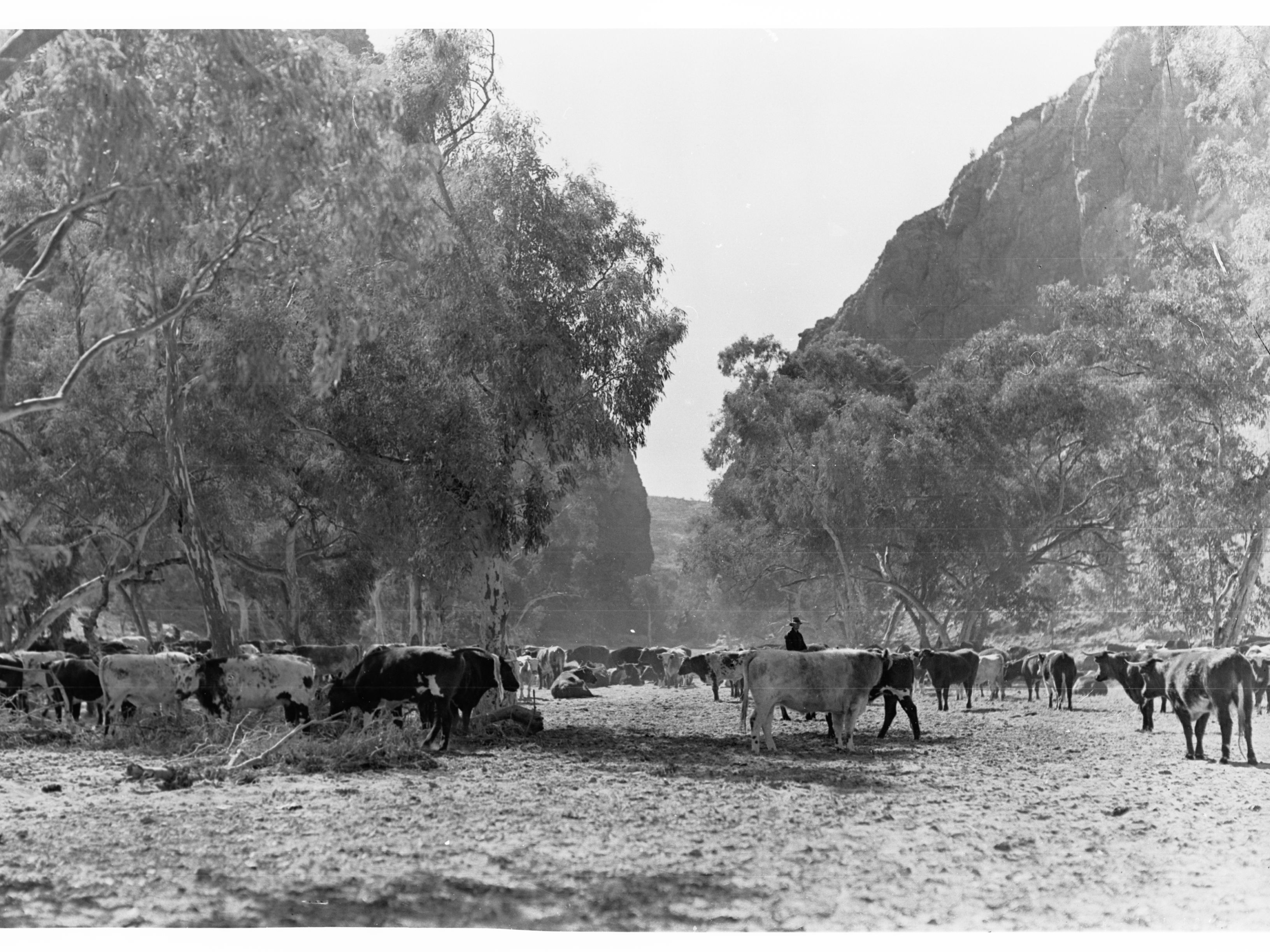
Cattle at Simpsons Gap, c.1935

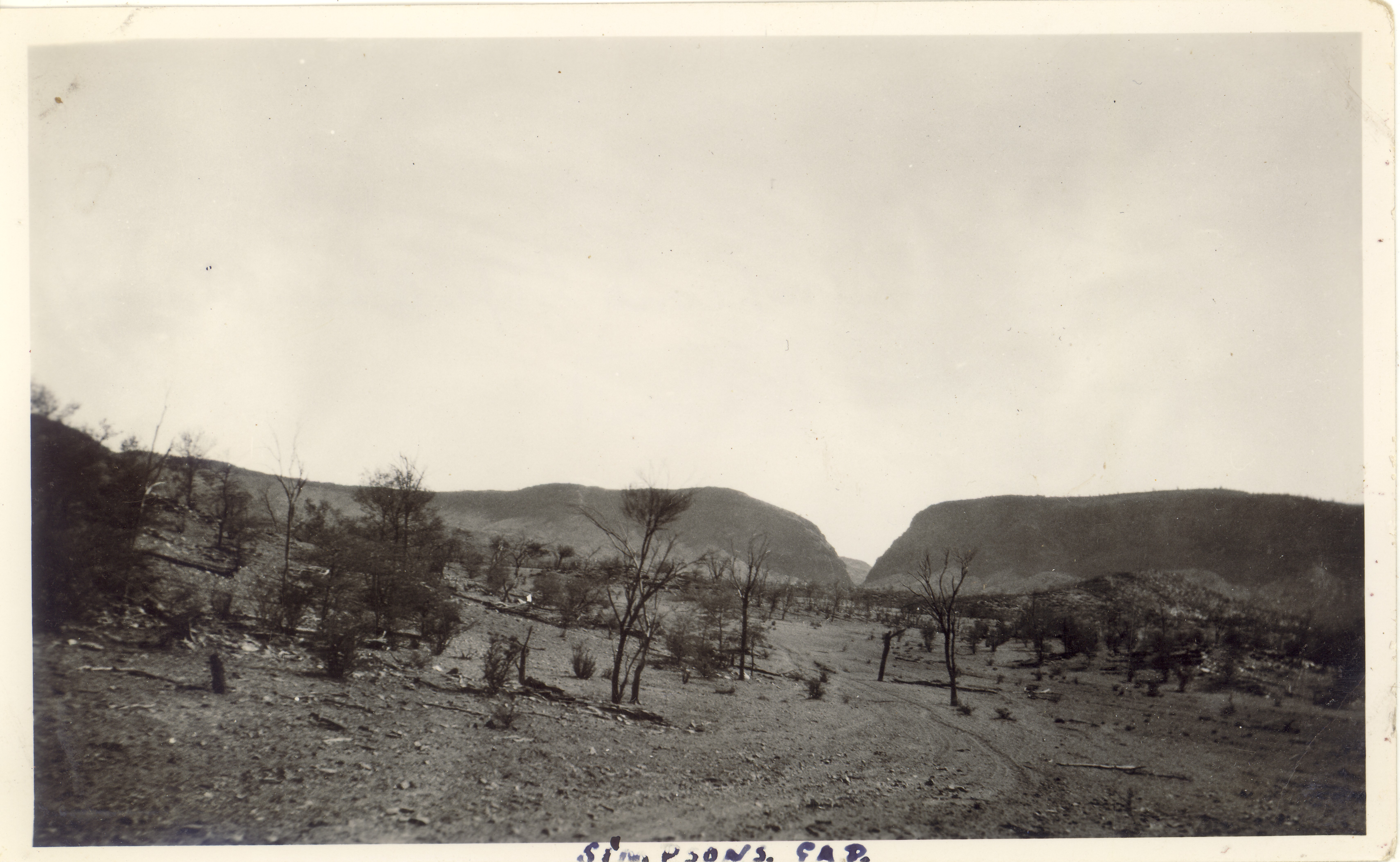
Simpsons Gap, c.1940s

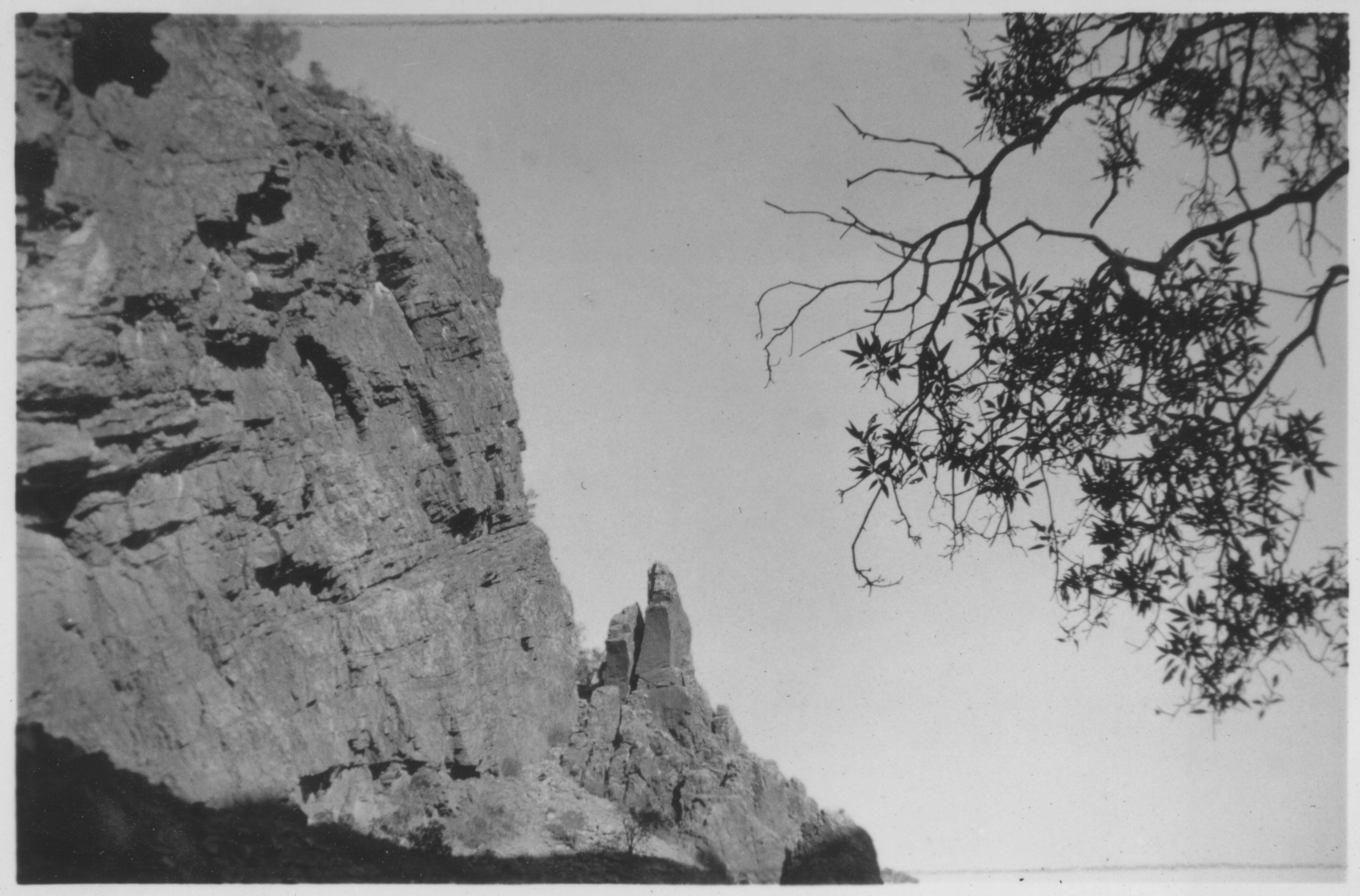
The pinnacle at Simpsons Gap in 1941
