= Larapinta Trail =

Walking track in the Northern Territory of Australia

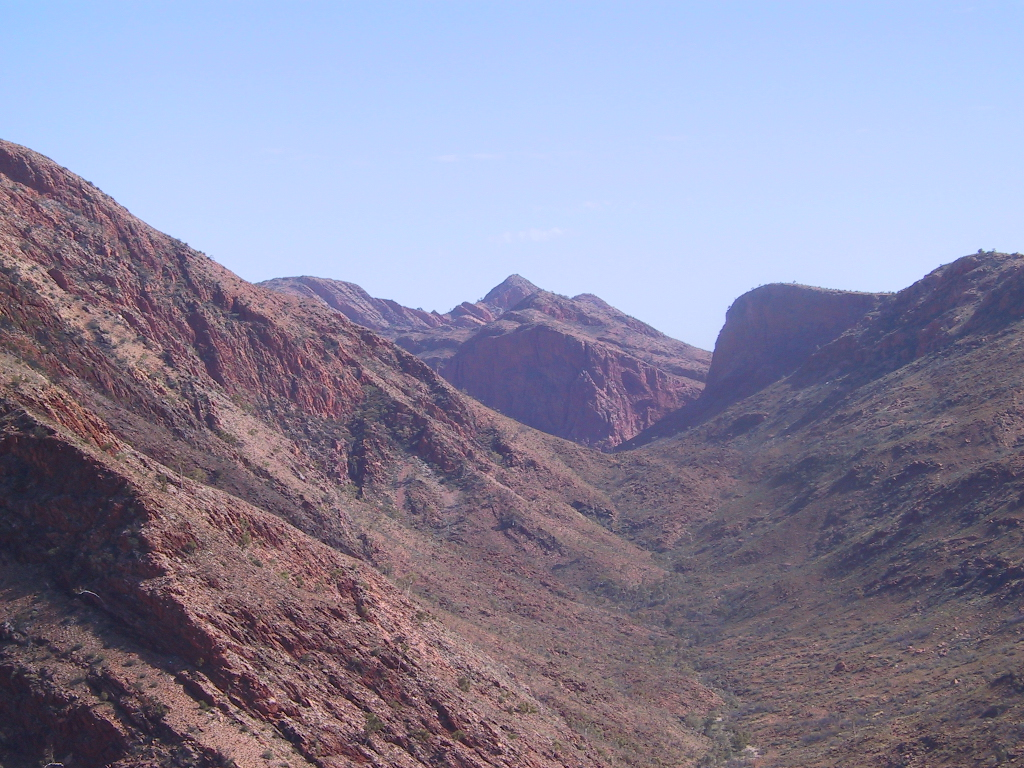
- Along the Larapinta trail from a ridge of the West MacDonnell Ranges
- Length: 223 km (139 mi)
- Location: Northern Territory, Australia
- Trailheads: Alice Springs, Mount Sonder
- Use: Hiking
- Difficulty: Medium
- Season: Winter
- Months: June to August
- Sights: Arid mountains, gorges, dry creek beds, waterholes
- Hazards: Dehydration, Snakes, Hyperthermia, Hypothermia
- Website: nt.gov.au/leisure/parks-reserves/plan-your-visit/bushwalking-hiking/larapinta-trail

The Larapinta Trail is an extended walking track in the Northern Territory of Australia. Its total length is 223 kilometres (139 mi) from east to west, with the eastern end at Alice Springs and the western end at Mount Sonder, one of the territory's highest mountains. It follows the West MacDonnell Ranges, sometimes along the ridge line, other times on the plain below, in the West MacDonnell National Park.

== Notable attractions ==
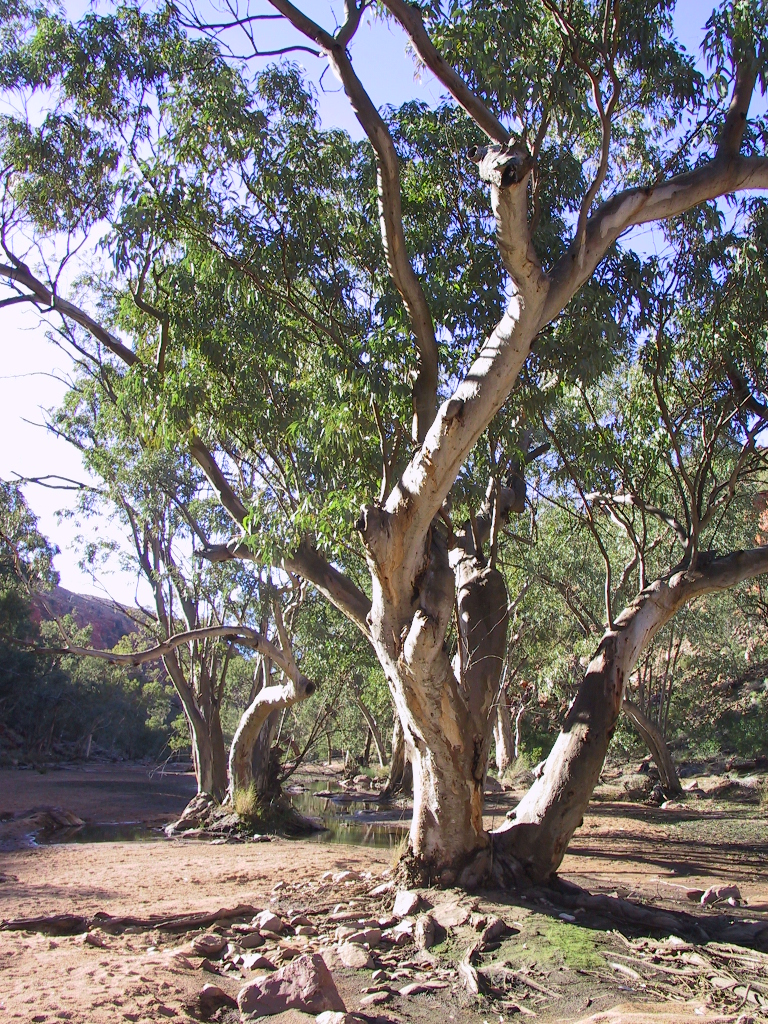
A tree on the Finke River along the Larapinta trail

- Finke River
- Simpsons Gap
- Standley Chasm
- Ellery Creek Bighole
- Serpentine Gorge
- Ochre Pits
- Ormiston Pound
- Redbank Gorge
- Glen Helen Gorge

== History ==
The walk harbours many Aboriginal sacred sites of the Arrernte people, who have permitted tourists to visit the sites.

The Larapinta Trail was the brainchild of Alan Ginns, who was a national park planner with the Conservation Commission of the NT in Alice Springs from 1982 to 1996. The trail was a key component of the concept for the West MacDonnell National Park, also one of Ginns' initiatives. Ginns gained the Northern Territory Government's approval of the concept of the park and the trail, and was involved in planning and construction of the majority of the Larapinta Trail before he left Alice Springs in 1996.

In the 1990s the walk was only half as long, with the section between Mount Sonder and Ellery Big Hole completed around 2000. The original Larapinta Trail plan was to end at Mount Zeil on the western end of the West MacDonnell National Park. The terrain from Mount Sonder to Mount Zeil being hard to access by vehicle for rescue operations, the trail stopped at Mount Sonder.

The Northern Territory government advertises the walk as Australia's best extended walk, competing with Western Australia's Bibbulmun Track and Tasmania's Overland Track and Western Arthurs track.

In September 2006, Belgian adventurer Louis-Philippe Loncke walked without resupply from west of Mount Zeil to Alice Springs, walking off track and joining the Larapinta Trail at Redbank Gorge.

On 16 August 2014, Jessica Baker and Meredith Quinlan set a new record, arriving at the Alice Springs Telegraph Station in 60 hours and 59 minutes, without crew and only the aid of drop boxes left at three locations en route.

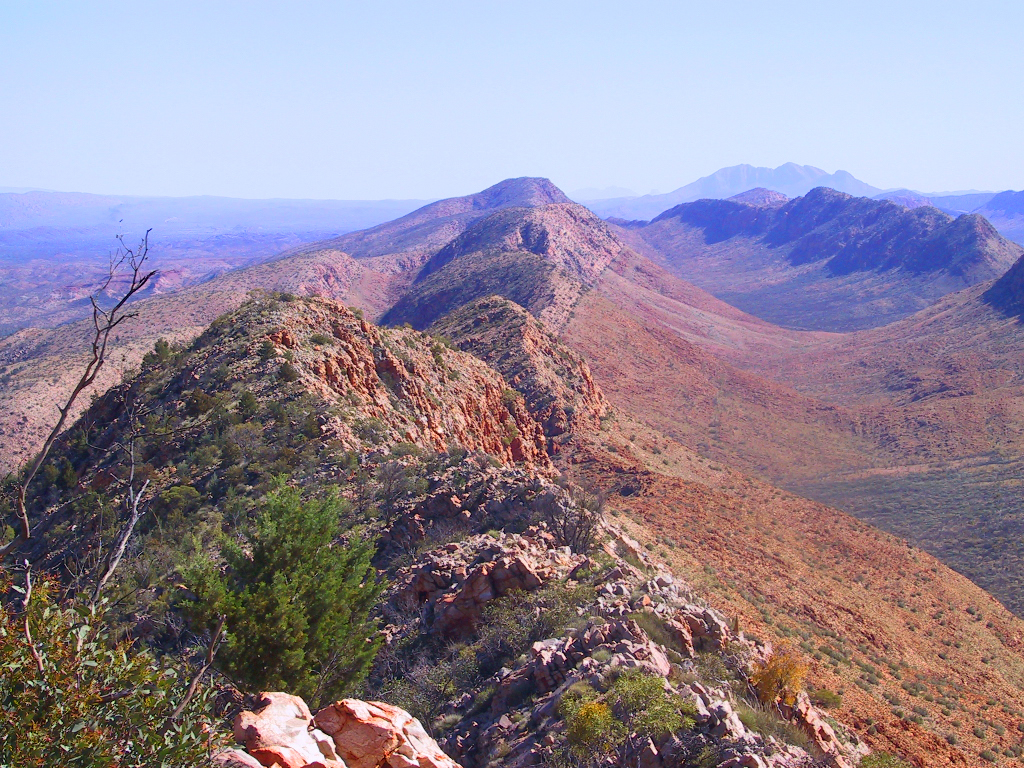
View along the West MacDonnell Ranges from the Larapinta Trail, near Glen Helen, with Mount Sonder in the background

== Amenities ==
A typical notice board between sections along the Larapinta Trail

The trail is very well marked with kilometre posts (though often inaccurate) marking both the distance to the next campsite or section as well as the total length of the walk to go. There is a published leaflet that details the requirements and attractions of completing each of the twelve sections and notice boards at the transition of each section. These notice boards also show elevation graphs of the walk and alert walkers to potential dangers.

There is a reasonable amount of water along the track, both naturally found and trucked in. There are only one or two places in which water cannot be obtained throughout the day, with frequent storage tanks. Signage suggests that all water should be treated by boiling it for five minutes or adding water treatment tablets. Some sections of the walk have long sections with no water tanks, meaning water must be carried.

No fires are allowed along the walk.

== Climate ==
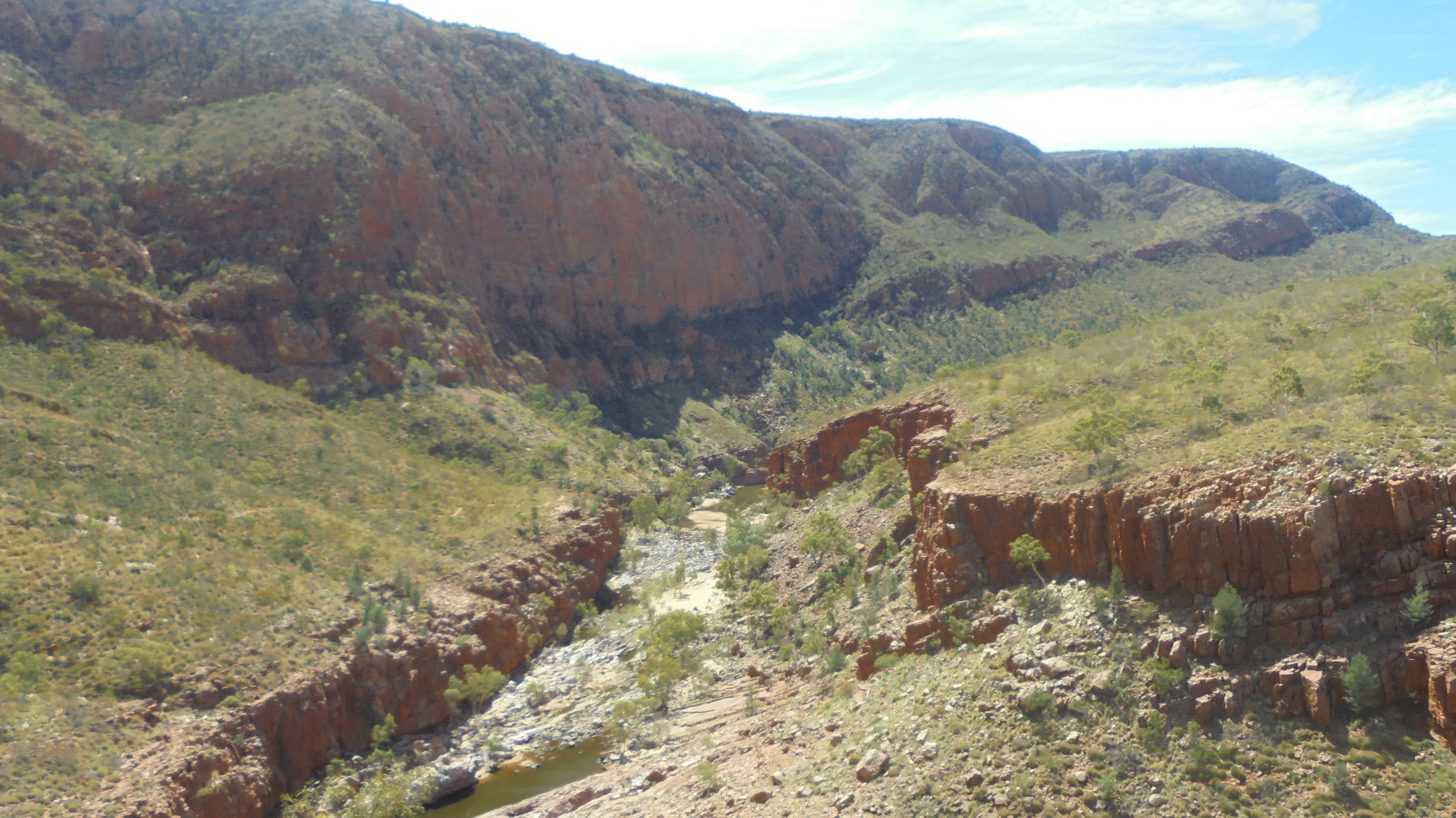
A canyon within the Larapinta Trail

During the summer months, temperatures along the trail can exceed 45 °C (113 °F), leading to risk of heat stroke and dehydration. Most people walk the trail during winter, when the days are cooler.

== See also ==
- MacDonnell Ranges
