= Ochre Pits =

Ochre mine in Northern Territory, Australia

Coordinates: 23°43′54″S 132°52′04″E

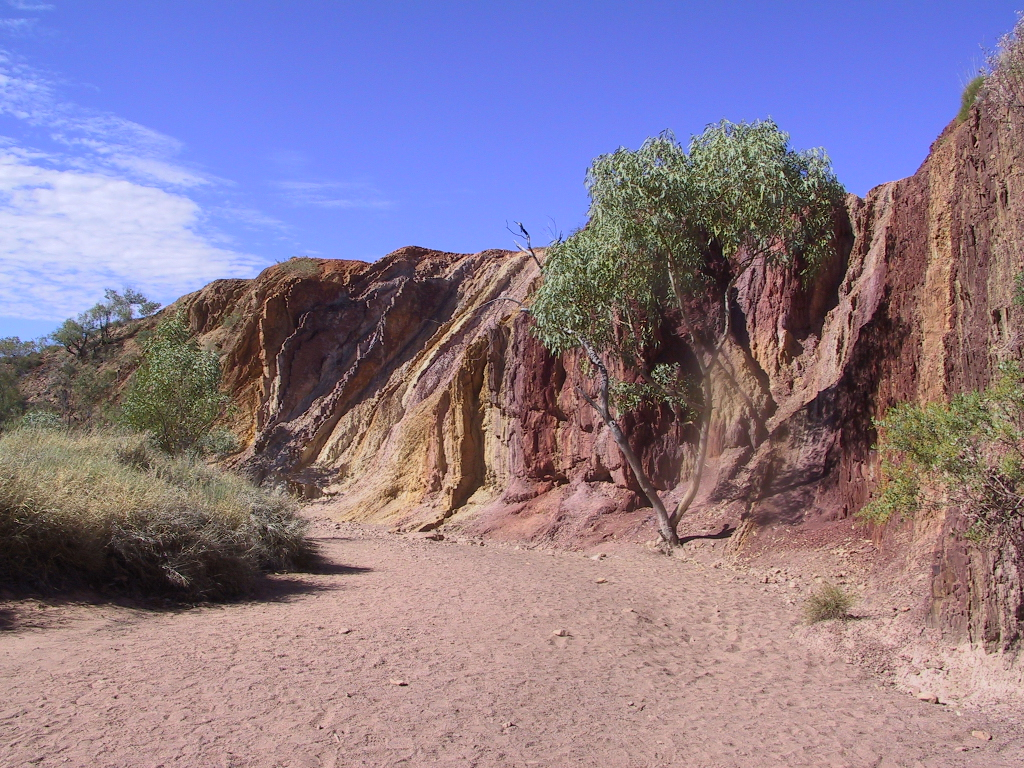
The Ochre Pits within the Tjoritja / West MacDonnell National Park

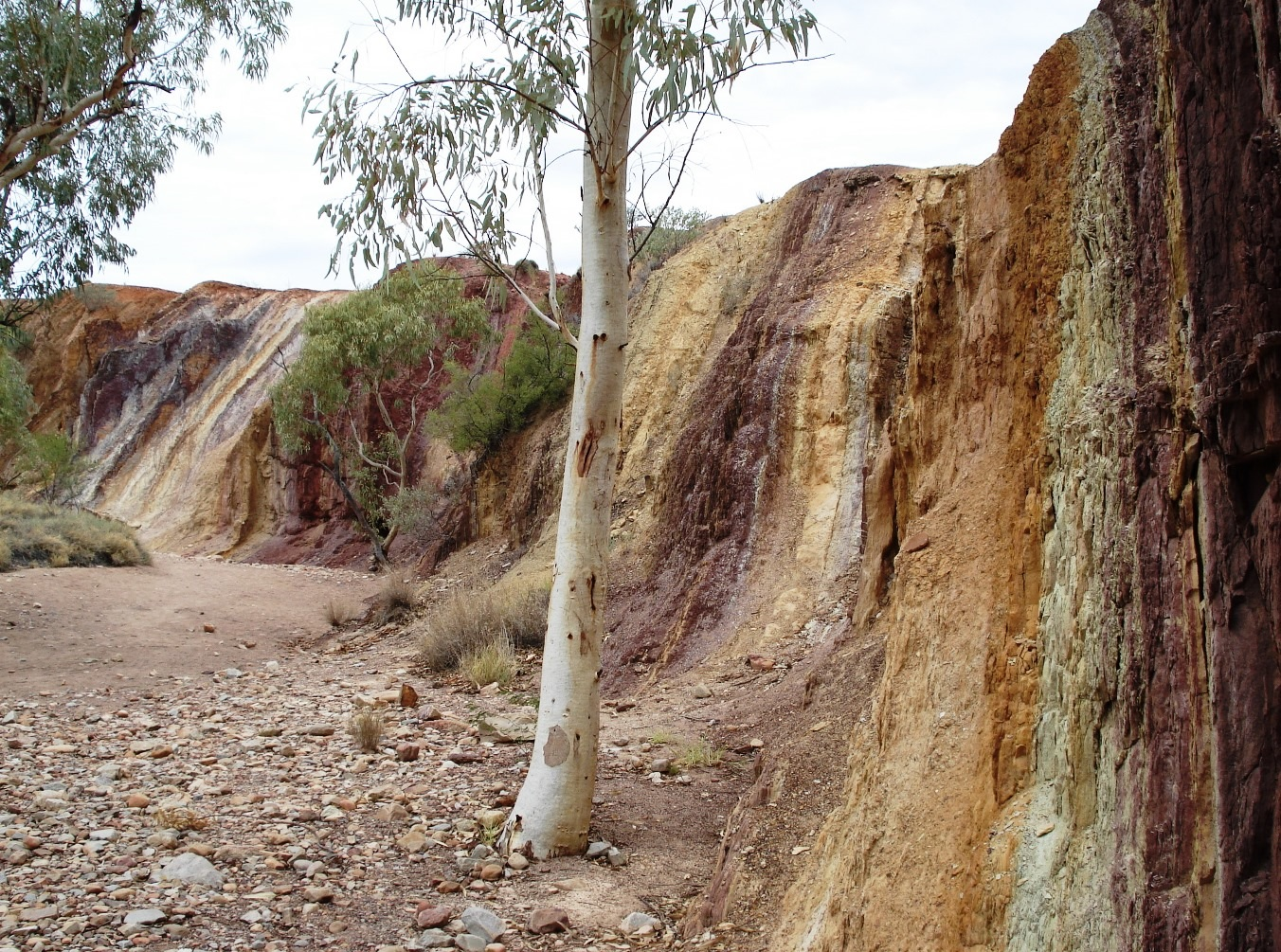
The Ochre Pits

The Ochre Pits are a popular tourist destination in Australia's Northern Territory, approximately 110 kilometres west of Alice Springs along the Larapinta Trail. They sit within the Tjoritja / West MacDonnell National Park, on the lands of the Arrernte people.

These pits are a significant Aboriginal heritage site, and the only quarry for ochre in the Central Australian region that is open to visitors and where the mining and collection of ochre by the traditional owners still occurs. The right to continue to take ochre from this site is protected by the Territory Parks and Wildlife Conservation Act 1976.

The ochre mined here was and is very culturally significant as it is the primary material used to create rock art in the region, as well as more contemporary art forms. The ochre, mixed with emu fat, was also used for body decorations for traditional dances and ceremonies. Ochre, mixed with eucalyptus leaves, was also used as an ointment to relieve congestion. It was also used for the ornamentation of spears and to ward off termites from damaging them; it was also believed to increase the success of hunting.

The ochre found here ranges in colour and range from white to earthy browns as well as brighter hues of yellow, orange and red. Certain colours and kinds of ochre were considered more valuable than others.

== See also ==
- MacDonnell Ranges
