= Serpentine Gorge =

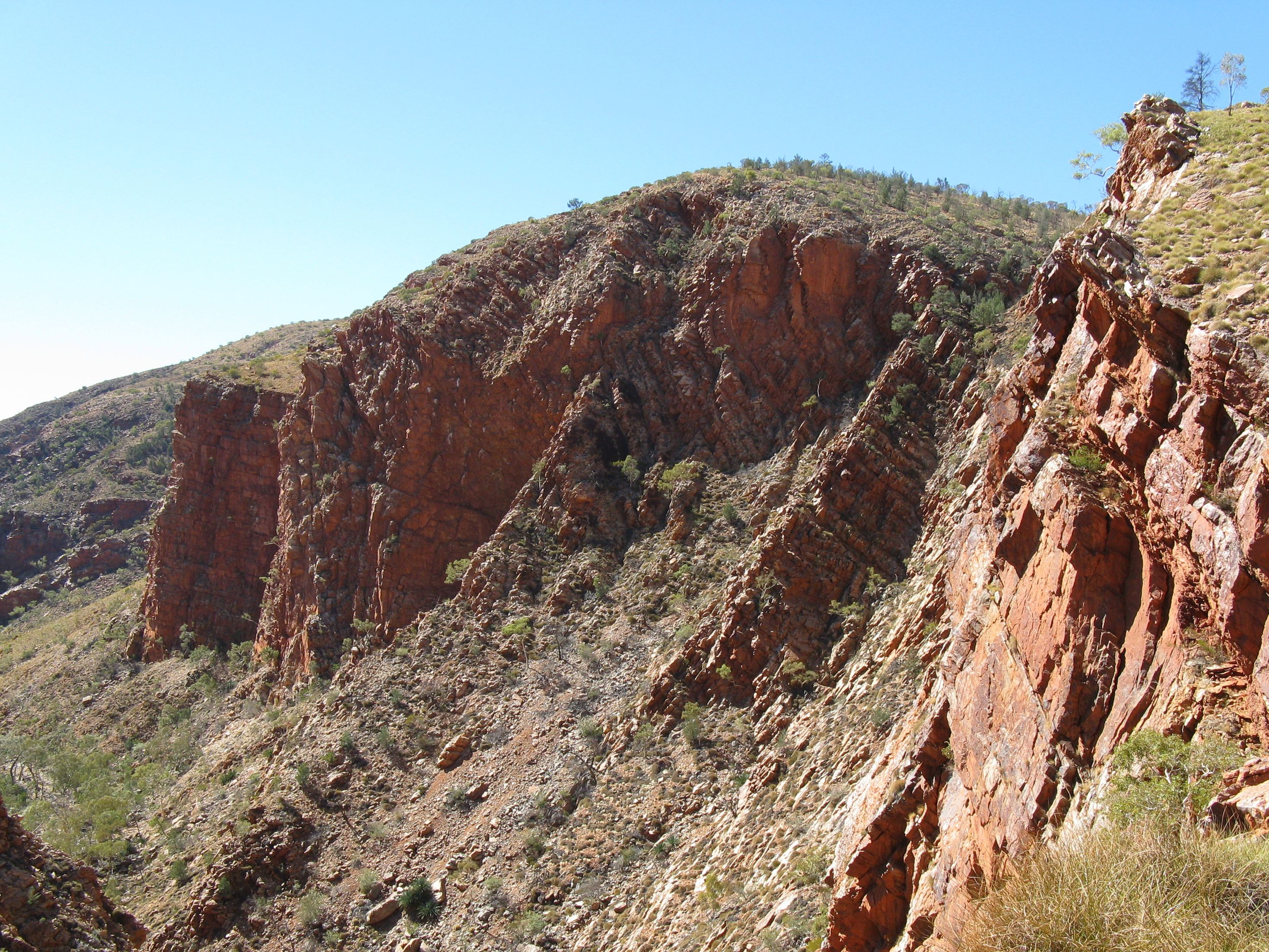
- Side wall of the gorge

- Location within Northern Territory

Third Approach
- Location: Burt Plain, Northern Territory
- Range: MacDonnell Ranges
- Coordinates: 23°45′00″S 132°58′00″E

Serpentine Gorge is one of the gorges in the West MacDonnell Ranges in Australia's Northern Territory. It is located approximately 100 kilometres west of Alice Springs along the Larapinta Trail.

It comprises two gorges created by a south flowing creek which has cut through two ridges of Heavitree Quartzite. The gorge is home to some rare Central Australian plants such as the Centralian flannel-flower and cycads (the Macrozamia macdonnellii). There is a semi-permanent waterhole guarding the entrance to the gorge.

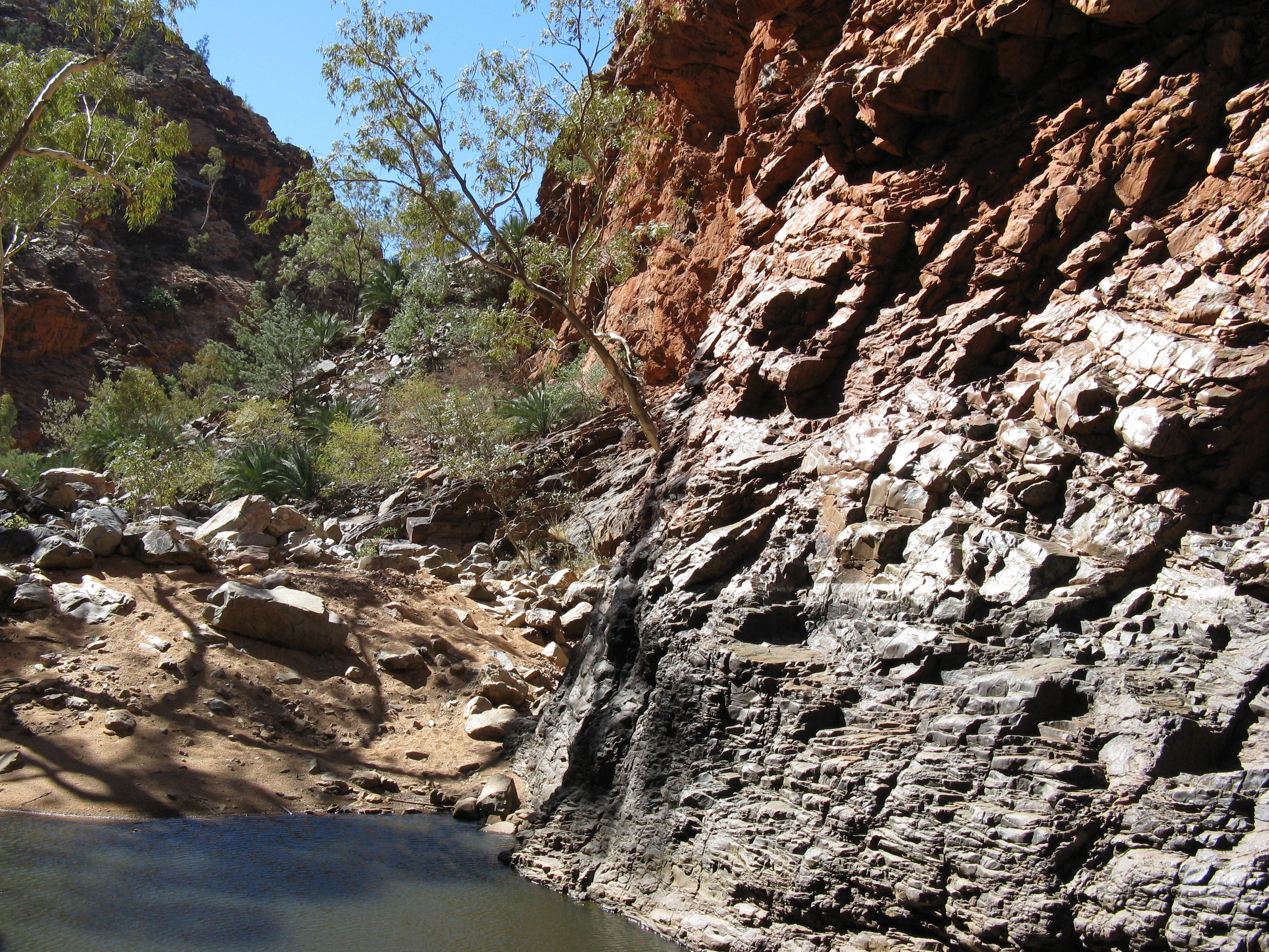
Section of waterhole at the gorge

== Tourism ==
There is a 1.3 kilometre walk along a service road, or alternatively along the creek bed, to the gorge, and a short steep climb to a lookout.

Section 7 of the Larapinta Trail starts at Ellery Creek Big Hole and ends here. Section 8 of the trail goes from here to Serpentine Chalet Dam.

Nearby are the ruins of Serpentine Chalet which was a late 1950s/early 1960s Ansett-Pioneer tourist venture. Lack of water and the remote location on an unsealed road brought about its demise. All that remains now are a concrete slab and other floor foundations.

== See also ==
- West MacDonnell Ranges
- West MacDonnell National Park
