= MacDonnell Ranges =

Mountain range in the Northern Territory, Australia

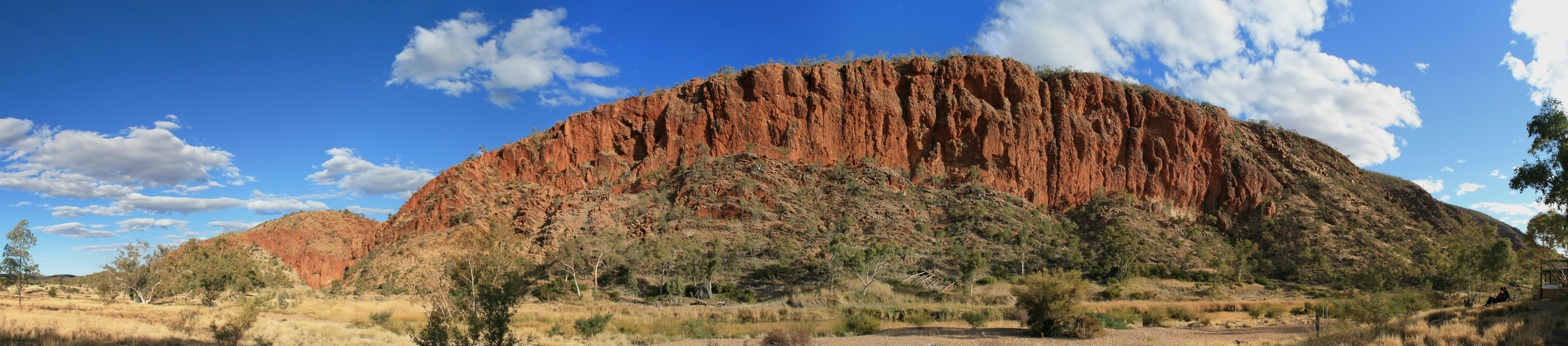
- Glen Helen Gorge in the MacDonnell Ranges

Highest point
- Peak: Mount Zeil
- Elevation: 1,531 m (5,023 ft); AHD
- Coordinates: 23°22′59″S 132°22′59″E

Dimensions
- Length: 644 km (400 mi) E/W

Naming
- Etymology: Sir Richard MacDonnell
- Native name: Tjoritja (Arrernte language)

Geography
- Location within Northern Territory
- Country: Australia
- Territory: Northern Territory
- Region: Alice Springs
- Range coordinates: 23°42′S 132°30′E

Geology
- Rock age: Carboniferous

MacDonnell Ranges
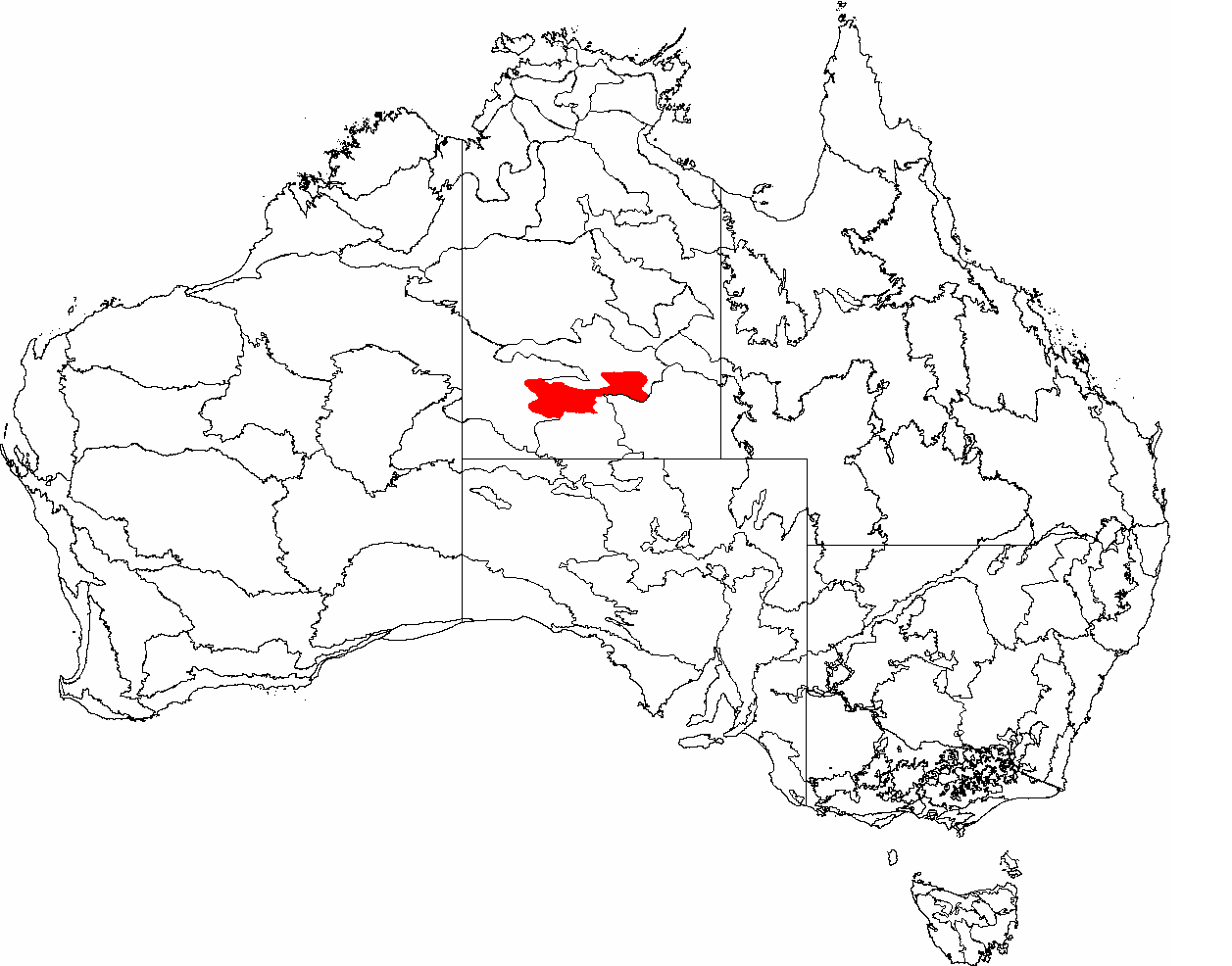
- The interim Australian bioregions, with the MacDonnell Ranges in red
- Country: Australia
- State: Northern Territory

Area
  - Total: 39,294 km^{2} (15,171 sq mi)
Localities around MacDonnell Ranges
Great Sandy Desert	Burt Plain	Channel Country
Great Sandy Desert	MacDonnell Ranges	Simpson Strzelecki Dunefields
Great Sandy Desert	Finke	Simpson Strzelecki Dunefields

The MacDonnell Ranges, or Tjoritja in the Arrernte language, is a mountain range in southern Northern Territory. MacDonnell Ranges is also the name given to an interim Australian bioregion broadly encompassing the mountain range, with an area of 3,929,444 hectares (9,709,870 acres). The range is a 644 km (400 mi) long series of mountains in central Australia, consisting of parallel ridges running to the east and west of Alice Springs. The mountain range contains many spectacular gaps and gorges as well as areas of Aboriginal significance.

The ranges were named after Sir Richard MacDonnell (the Governor of South Australia at the time) by John McDouall Stuart, whose 1860 expedition reached them in April of that year. The Horn Expedition investigated the ranges as part of the scientific expedition into central Australia. Other explorers of the range included David Lindsay and John Ross.

The MacDonnell Ranges were often depicted in the paintings of Albert Namatjira.

== Geography ==
The highest peaks are Mount Zeil with an elevation of 1,531 metres (5,023 ft) AHD, Mount Edward at 1,423 metres (4,669 ft), Mount Giles at 1,389 metres (4,557 ft) Mount Sonder at 1,380 metres (4,530 ft) AHD and Mount Liebig at 1,249 metres (4,098 ft) AHD, the five highest mountains in the Northern Territory. The headwaters of the Todd, Finke and Sandover rivers form in the MacDonnell Ranges. The range is crossed by the Australian Overland Telegraph Line, the Stuart Highway and the Adelaide–Darwin rail corridor at the Heavitree Gap, a water gap created by the Todd River, at the southern entrance to Alice Springs.

== Geology ==
Some 300-350 million years ago a mountain building event created the MacDonnell Ranges. Since that time, folding, faulting and erosion have shaped the range and created numerous gaps and gorges. The ranges are composed of many rock types, but are most famous for their red quartzite peaks and gorges. Other rock types include granite, limestone, sandstone and siltstone. Some of the valleys of the range contain fossil evidence of the inland sea that once covered central Australia.

== Ecology ==
Part of the Central Ranges xeric scrub ecoregion of dry scrubby grassland, the ranges are home to a large number of endemic species that includes the centralian tree frog Litoria gilleni. This is mostly due to the micro climates that are found around the cold rock pools.

== Tourist attractions ==
The West MacDonnell National Park was established in 1984 to protect the numerous parks and reserves of the range, including internal residents inside the range. It also facilitated the development of the Larapinta Trail.

To the east of Alice Springs, within an hour's drive, are sites important to the local Arrernte people, many of which contain examples of Aboriginal rock art. These include Emily Gap, Jessie Gap, Trephina Gorge and N’Dhala Gorge.

To the west of Alice Springs is the Larapinta Trail—a world-class, long distance bush walking trail that runs 223 kilometres (139 mi) along the backbone of the range. Along the trail are Simpsons Gap, Standley Chasm, Ellery Creek Big Hole, Serpentine Gorge, Ochre Pits, Ormiston Pound, Redbank Gorge, Glen Helen Gorge, Mount Sonder and Mount Giles.

== Gallery ==
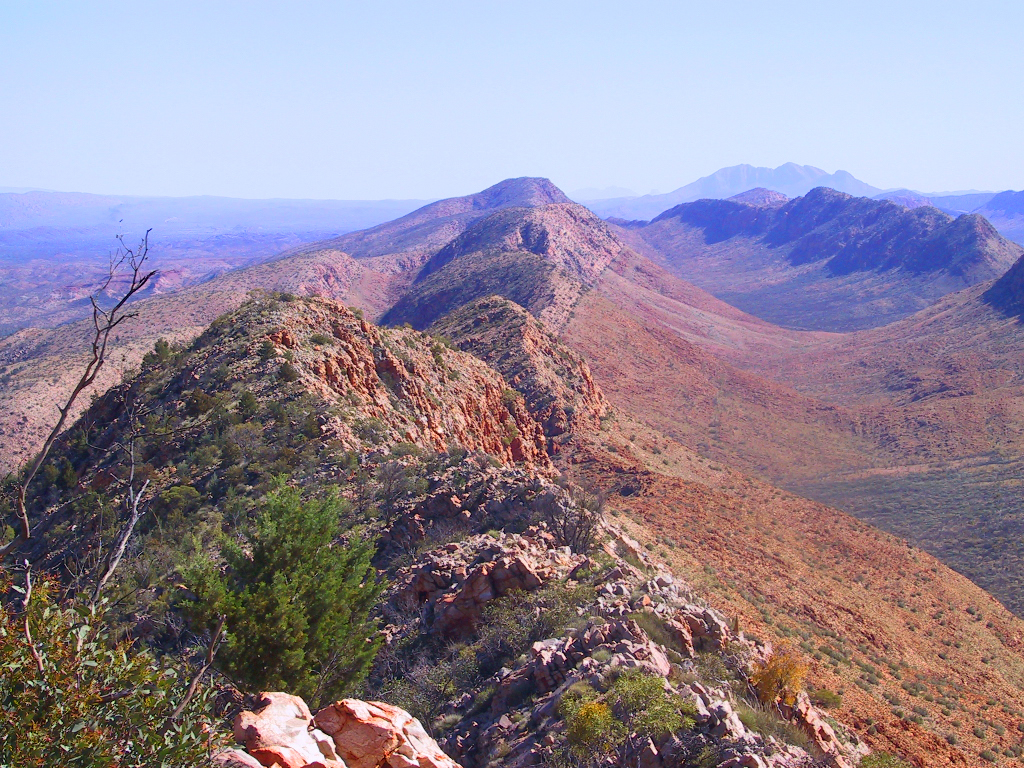
From the Larapinta Trail near Glen Helen

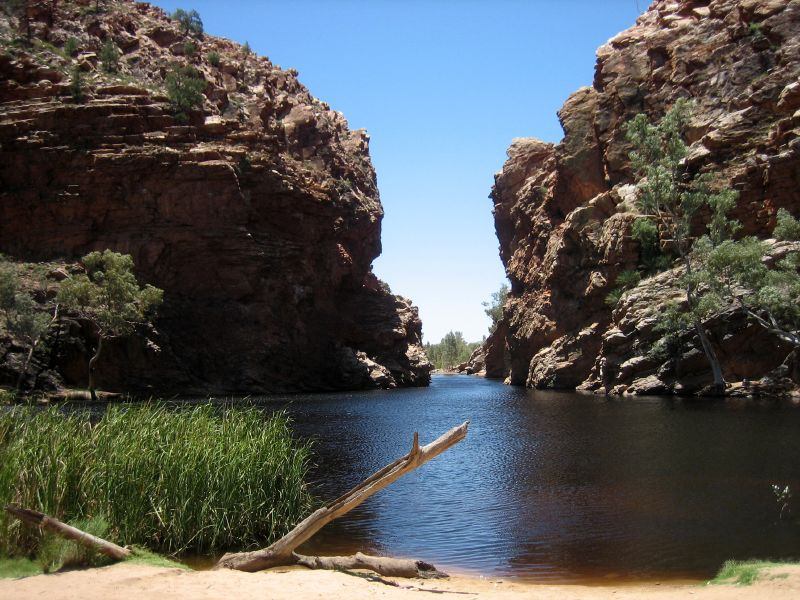
Ellery Creek Big Hole

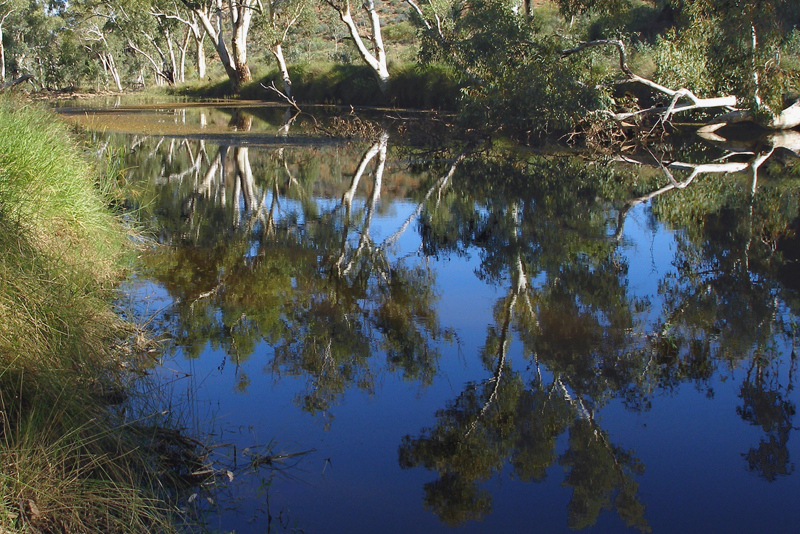
Ellery Creek and river red gum trees

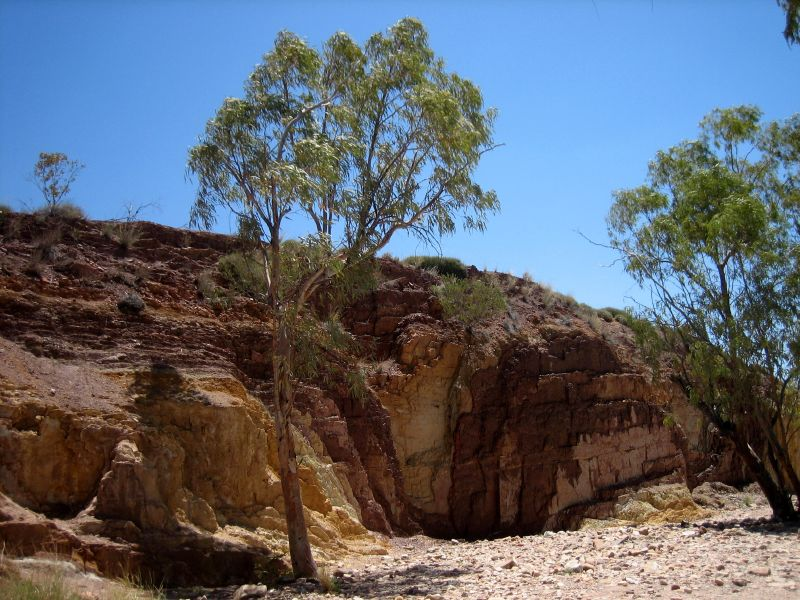
Ochre pits

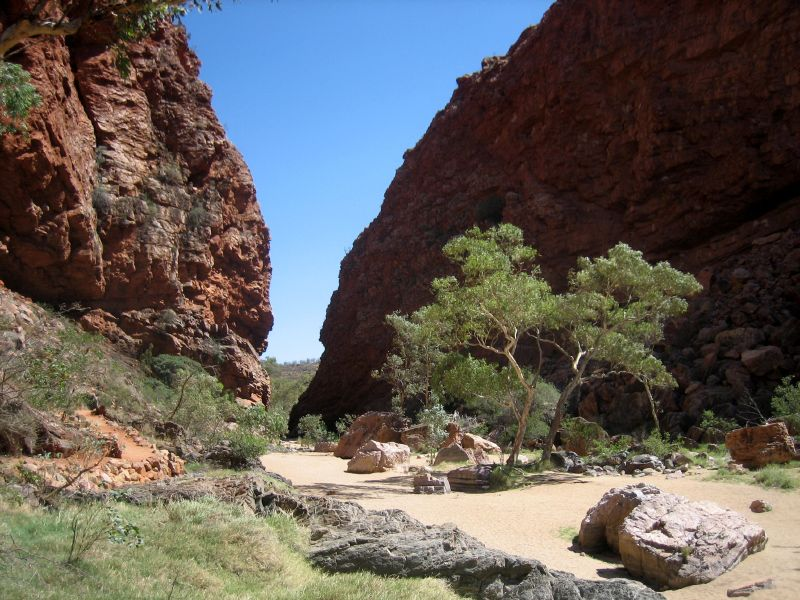
Simpsons Gap

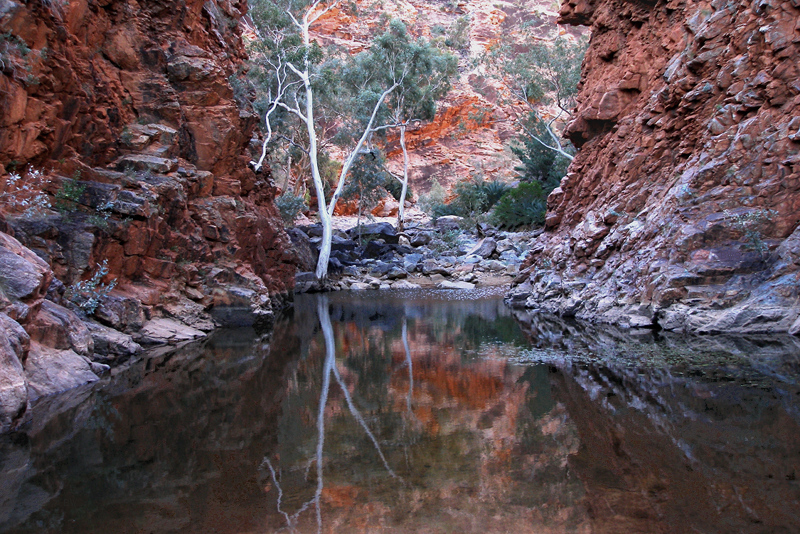
Serpentine Gorge

== See also ==
- Geography of Australia
- List of mountains in Australia
- Pine Gap
- Western Arrernte
- N'Dhala Gorge Nature Park
- Heavitree Gap
