= Mount Sonder =

Mountain in Northern Territory, Australia

Mount Sonder (Rwetyepme)
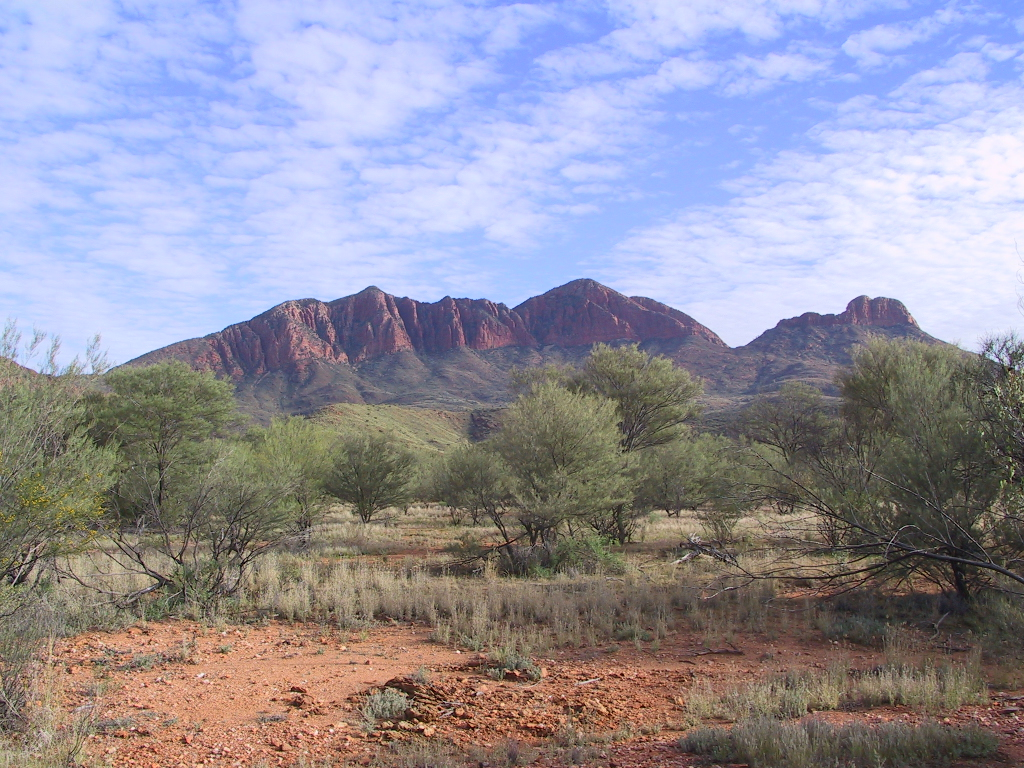
- Mount Sonder from the east

Highest point
- Elevation: 1,380 m (4,530 ft)AHD
- Coordinates: 23°35′S 132°36′E

Naming
- Etymology: Dr. Otto Wilhelm Sonder
- Native name: Rwetyepme

Geography
- Location within Northern Territory
- Location: Northern Territory, Australia
- Parent range: MacDonnell Ranges

Climbing
- Easiest route: Hike

Mount Sonder, or Rwetyepme, its Aboriginal name, is the fourth highest mountain in the Northern Territory, Australia at 1,380 metres (4,530 ft) AHD. Mount Zeil is the highest at 1,531 metres (5,023 ft), 27 kilometres (17 mi) to the west.

== Location and features ==
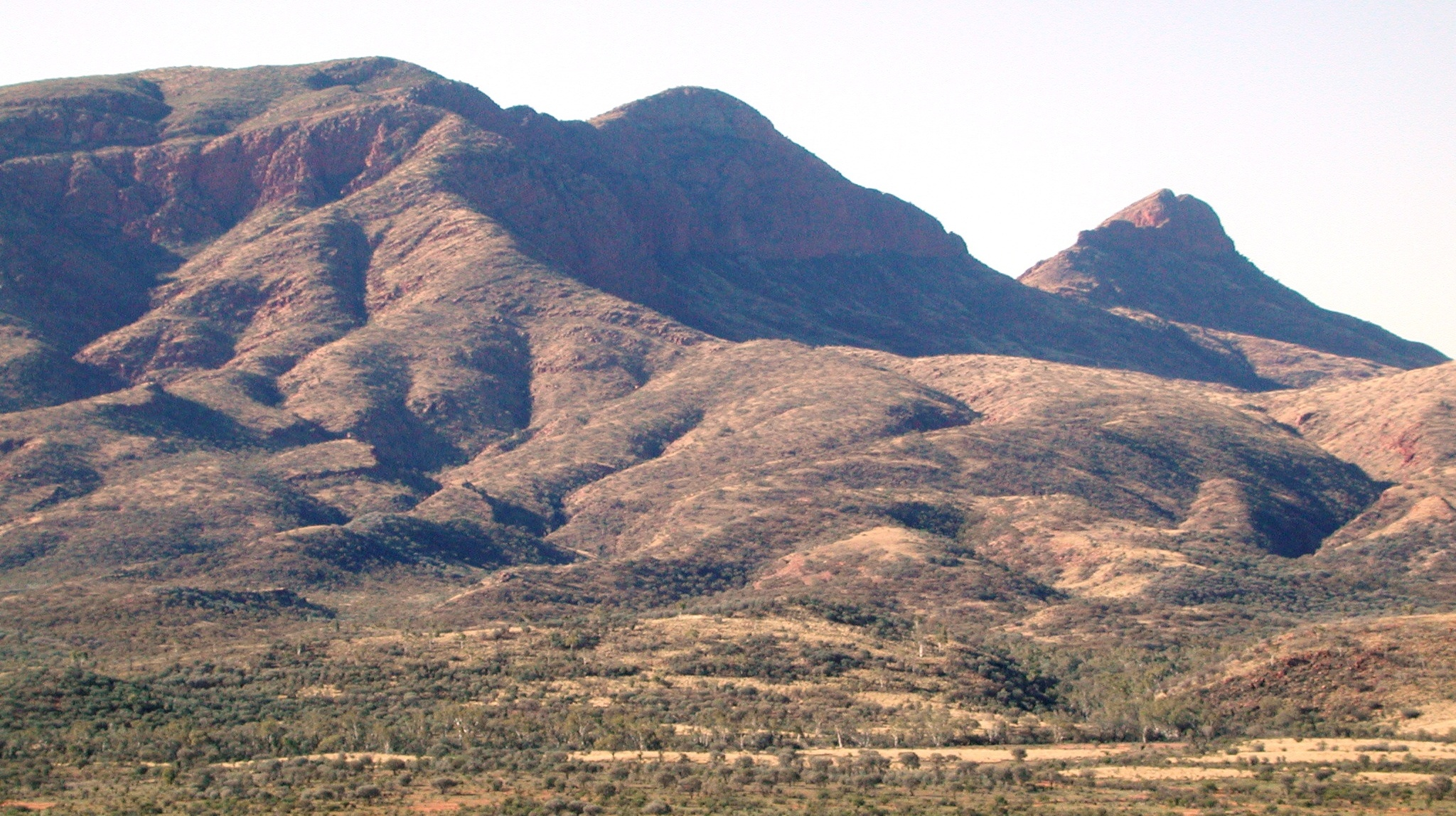
Close-up of Mount Sonder from the south

Mt Sonder is 130 km (81 mi) west of Alice Springs along the MacDonnell Ranges in the West MacDonnell National Park. It marks one end of the celebrated Larapinta trail, which extends 223 kilometres (139 mi) to Alice Springs. The shape of the mountain is a double peak, the relative heights of which are somewhat ambiguous from the summit, although easy to identify from the surrounding plains. The mountain can be seen from the western half of the Larapinta trail, up to Ormiston Pound, which obscures it from then on.

Explorer Ernest Giles named the mountain in honour of German botanist Dr. Otto Wilhelm Sonder.

A clearly defined walking track exists up the western side, which is about 12 kilometres (7.5 mi) long. Water is available from a tank 50 metres (160 ft) beyond the carpark, and there is a direction plate at the summit. This however is not the true summit, which is a further 750 metres (2,460 ft) away, but has been chosen for safety reasons. The view from the top boasts the taller Mount Zeil to the west, the West MacDonnell Range to the east, Glen Helen, a nearby resort, to the east and Gosses Bluff to the south-west.

== See also ==
- List of mountains of Australia
