= Felix Giles =

Felix Giles may refer to:

- Felix "Nighthawk" Giles, American NASCAR driver
- Felix Giles (engineer) (1885–1950), Australian engineer and ANZAC officer

== See also ==
- Felix de Giles (born 1989), British jockey
