= Alfred Giles (explorer) =

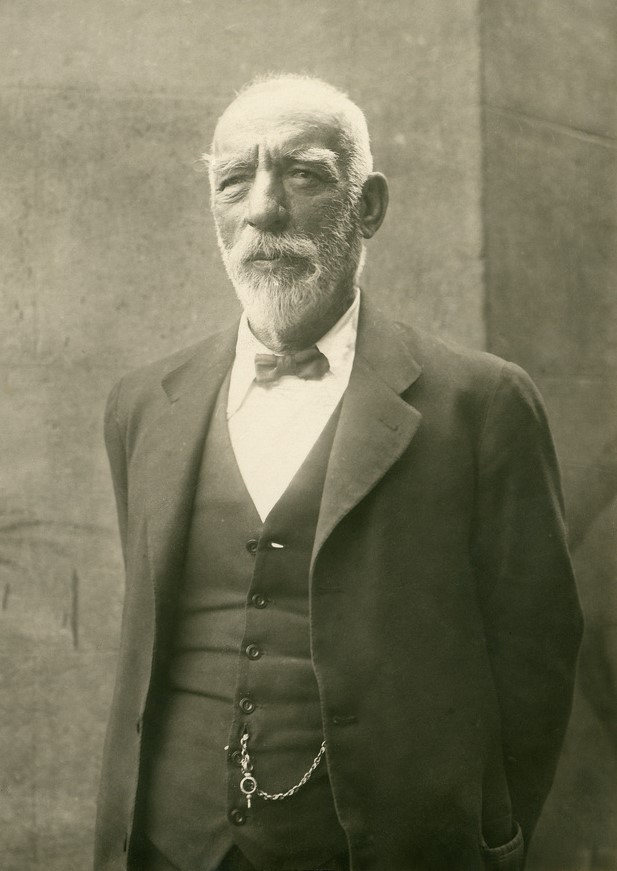

Alfred Giles (18 February 1846 – 20 March 1931), born in Datchet, England, was a South Australian bushman, drover and explorer who crossed Australia from south to north seven times, mostly in connection with the building of the Overland Telegraph Line 1870–1872.

== History ==
Giles was a son of Christopher Giles Snr (25 March 1802 – 26 April 1884), a member of the Corn Exchange, London, and his wife Hannah Giles, née Tester (25 December 1812 – 17 February 1900).

He came to Australia with his parents, three brothers and two sisters, leaving London on 21 January 1849 on the Calcutta, arriving in South Australia on 22 June 1849. They were accompanied by a large quantity of merchandise and other property, including a portable cottage, which they erected at his 400-acre property on the River Wakefield.

In 1853 his father took up a lease of land at Ketchowla Station which is located between Terowie and Morgan. Giles and his family were later joined by Hillary Boucaut in 1861. In 1864, after a series of poor seasons and considerable losses, he sold his interest and retired to the city.

Alfred Giles was educated at J. L. Young's Adelaide Educational Institution, and after leaving school joined the party which John Ross had organised to traverse the country in 1870, planning the route for Charles Todd's Overland Telegraph Line, Giles being placed second in command. The party was the second to cross the unexplored interior of central Australia, 300 miles to the east of John McDouall Stuart's 1862 route. In the diary kept by Giles during the Overland Telegraph Survey Expedition, he records the movement of the exploration party between camps and includes drawings of expedition party members, the lyrics of a song by John P. Ordway, and other observations. On 4 January 1871, Giles wrote:

"Spelling all day in order to ascend Central Mt. Sturt, Mr. Ross started at 8 am to ascend the Mount and about 9 am Mr. Harvey and Mr. Hearn followed. At 11.30 am Mr. Ross returned having ascended the Mount, found the cairn stones raised by Stuart, and bringing with him the bottle buried by Stuart containing papers. The bottle is apparently one generally used for French capers and capped with oilskin and sealed; Inside is a thin roll also wrapped in waterproof cloth and tied with hemp, and outside all is a copy of the Adelaide "Observer" dated January 7, 1860. The whole is in excellent preservation although about eleven years since the Explorer planted it. Mr. Ross will forward the bottle unopened to Adelaide for the inspection of Mr. Todd. This is the first party to reach the Centre since the gallant Stuart planted the British flag in Central Australia."

Others involved with him in this project were George Chalmers of Daly Waters, and Jack Cleland of Port Adelaide, a hero of the SS Gothenburg tragedy in 1875. In 1871 Giles was the first to cross Leichhardt's Bar on the Roper River, after the famous explorer crossed it in 1845. In 1873, 5,000 sheep were overlanded from Adelaide by Alfred Giles for distribution to Telegraph Stations along the Line, such as Barrow Creek.

With his brother Arthur John Giles, he helped develop properties for pastoralist Dr. W. J. Browne. Among these were Newcastle Waters Station, Springvale and Delamere. Cattle, horses and sheep were brought into the Territory at different times for the purpose of stocking these properties.

Giles married Mary Sprigg at Naracoorte in 1880. They managed Dr. Browne's Spring Vale Station at the Katherine River, 7 miles from Katherine in the early 1890s, and they afterwards owned the Bonrook Station on the Stuck-Up Waterhole, South of Pine Creek.

About eight miles from Spring Vale he discovered a series of large caves, which he named the Kintore Caves, containing beautiful stalactites and stalagmites. He told how he once took Thomas Playford, a premier of South Australia, through the caves. The politician, who was remarkable for his huge bulk, got stuck tight between two stalactites, and one pillar had to be cut down before he was released.

Early in 1882 he established Delamere Station on the Flora River, and grew cotton.

Giles lived in the Territory for nearly 50 years, and died at his home at Marlborough Street, College Park or St. Peters.

== Family ==
=== Siblings ===
Alfred's elder brother, Christopher Giles jun., (c. 1841 – 27 November 1917) was, with A. T. Woods, surveyors in Goyder's 1868 expedition, and with Charles Todd in 1870. He served at the Charlotte Waters repeater station until 1876 and remained with the Postmaster General's Department in charge of the accountancy section, until 1905 when he retired. He was a recognised authority on Middle-Eastern languages.

Other brothers included Arthur John Giles (c. 1842 – 6 September 1902) who died at Palmerston in the Northern Territory and Edgar Giles (c. 1846 – 13 July 1915), another AEI prizewinner, who married Maude Am(e)y Gliddon (5 April 1857 – 7 June 1910) on 1 June 1876, daughter of prominent banker Arthur William Gliddon, had a home at Glenelg, South Australia. He died at Brunswick Junction, Western Australia.

There were two other siblings.

=== Wife and children ===
Alfred Giles married Mary Augusta Sprigg (c. 1849 – c. 5 April 1940) on 26 February 1880. Their children were:

- Major Felix Gordon Giles, D.S.O. (23 November 1885 – 22 June 1950), Commanding Officer of the 10th Battalion, AIF, during World War I. He married Elsie Kilpack Marshall on 24 July 1909.
- Leslie Henry Alfred Giles (c. 1888 – 11 July 1949) was chief clerk and accountant in the Northern Territory Administration, Darwin
- Harold Stanage Giles (7 March 1890 – 1960) married Lilian Doris Dunlop on 25 March 1924, He was manager of Elsey Station (home of Mrs Aeneas Gunn) and Hodgson Station. He enlisted with the 30/5 Light Horse, AIF on 7 November 1917 but was discharged on 4 March 1918 as medically unfit due to a preexisting condition. He was Protector of Aborigines for North Australia from 13 April 1927 to 15 April 1930 and Justice of the Peace from 7 July 1932.
- Maude Lorenzo Frances Giles (1893 – 12 February 1926) married (1) William Herbert Perry on 1 June 1912 (2) Sir Alex Thomas Cockburn-Campbell on 9 April 1918

=== Unrelated ===
Alfred Giles was no relation to the famous explorer Ernest Giles, though they knew each other professionally and were friends.

== Some notes about plant names ==
The following plants are linked to Charlotte Waters by the various Gileses and are indigenous to the area:

- Christopher Giles is commemorated by the species name of dolomite fuchsia bush, Eremophila christopheri, whose habitat includes Charlotte Waters.
- The genus Gilesia is named for both Christopher and Ernest Giles.
- Cyperus gilesii and Panicum gilesii are usually listed as honouring Ernest Giles, but the type details for both species are given by George Bentham only as "Central Australia. Charlotte Waters, Giles".
- The desert fuchsia, Eremophila gilesii, which honours Ernest, is widespread across the region.

== Bibliography ==
- Giles, Alfred (1926). Exploring in the Seventies and the Construction of the Overland Telegraph Line. Link is to online version. Adelaide: W.K Thomas & Co. (Written when he was nearly 80, Giles describes six frustrating months searching for a route and reliable water supplies. Includes a photo of Giles taken in 1878 and a map of the Overland Telegraph Line from Giles's account, showing the course and repeater stations, many of which developed into towns.)
