= Kurdaitcha =

Type of Australian Aboriginal sorcerer

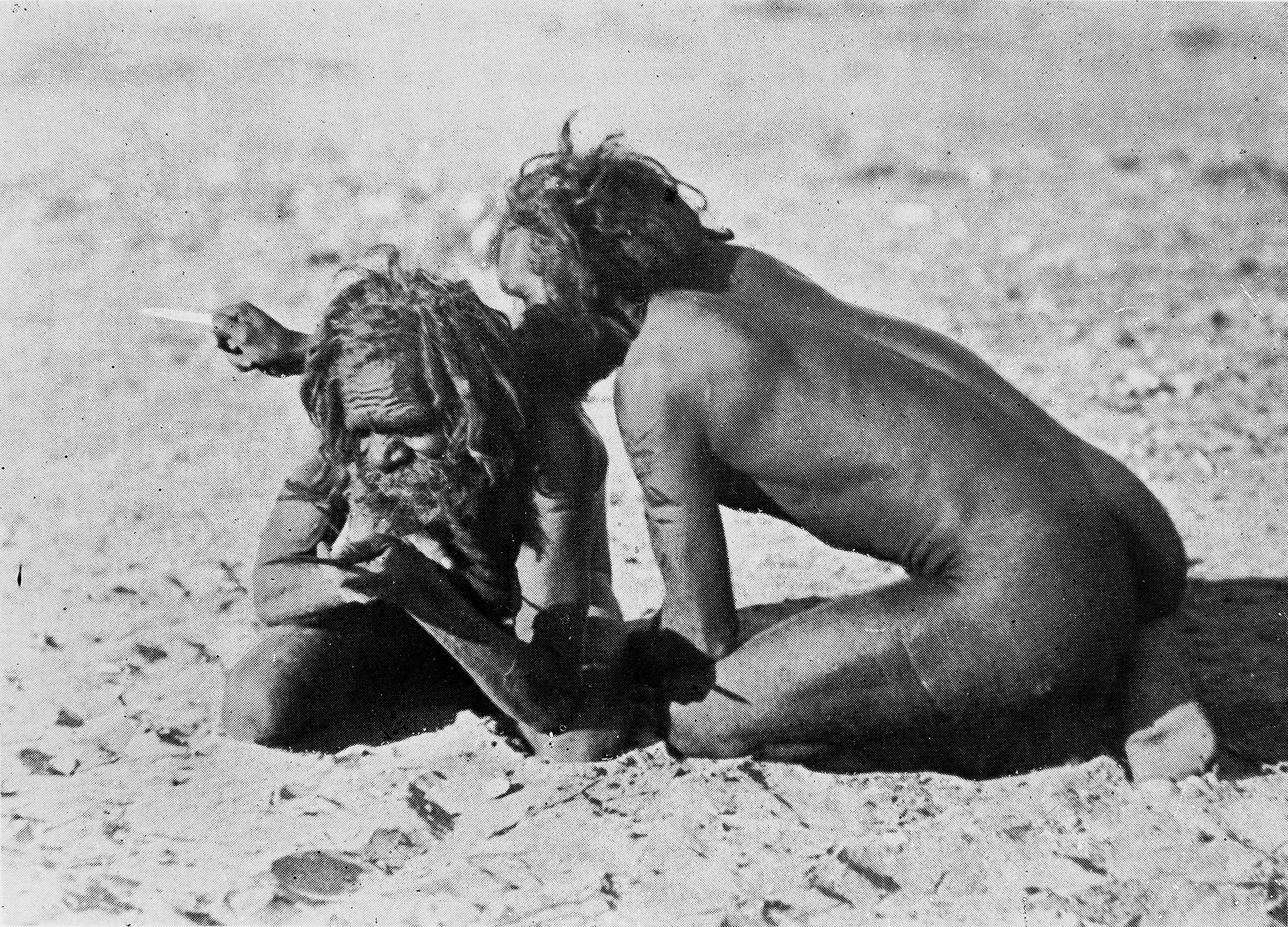
Aluridja men using a pointing bone

A kurdaitcha, or kurdaitcha man, also spelt gadaidja, cadiche, kadaitcha, karadji, or kaditcha (Arrernte orthography: kwertatye), is a type of shaman and traditional executioner amongst the Arrernte people, an Aboriginal group in Central Australia. The name featherfoot is used to denote the same figure by other Aboriginal peoples.

The kurdaitcha may be brought in to punish a guilty party by death. The word may also relate to the ritual in which the death is willed by the kurdaitcha man, known also as bone-pointing. The word may also be used by Europeans to refer to the shoes worn by the kurdaitcha, which are woven of feathers and human hair and treated with blood.

== Background ==
Among traditional Indigenous Australians there is no such thing as a belief in natural death. All deaths are considered to be the result of evil spirits or spells, usually influenced by an enemy. Often, a dying person will whisper the name of the person they think caused their death. If the identity of the guilty person is not known, a "magic man" will watch for a sign, such as an animal burrow leading from the grave showing the direction of the home of the guilty party. This may take years but the identity is always eventually discovered. The elders of the mob that the deceased belonged to then hold a meeting to decide a suitable punishment. A kurdaitcha may or may not be arranged to avenge them.

=== Illapurinja ===
An illapurinja, literally "the changed one", is a female kurdaitcha who is secretly sent by her husband to avenge some wrong, most often the failure of a woman to cut herself as a mark of sorrow on the death of a family member. Believed to be entirely mythical, the fear of the illapurinja would be enough to induce following the custom.

=== 20th century ===
The practice of kurdaitcha had died out completely in southern Australia by the 20th century although it was still carried out infrequently in the north.

In a report in by the Adelaide Advertiser in 1952, some Indigenous men had died in The Granites gold mine in the Tanami Desert, after reporting a sighting of a kurdaitcha man. They were very scared and danced a corroboree to chase evil spirits away. Anthropologist Ted Strehlow and doctors brought in to investigate said that the deaths were most likely caused by malnutrition and pneumonia, and Strehlow said that Aboriginal belief in "black magic" was in general dying out.

== Kurdaitcha shoes ==
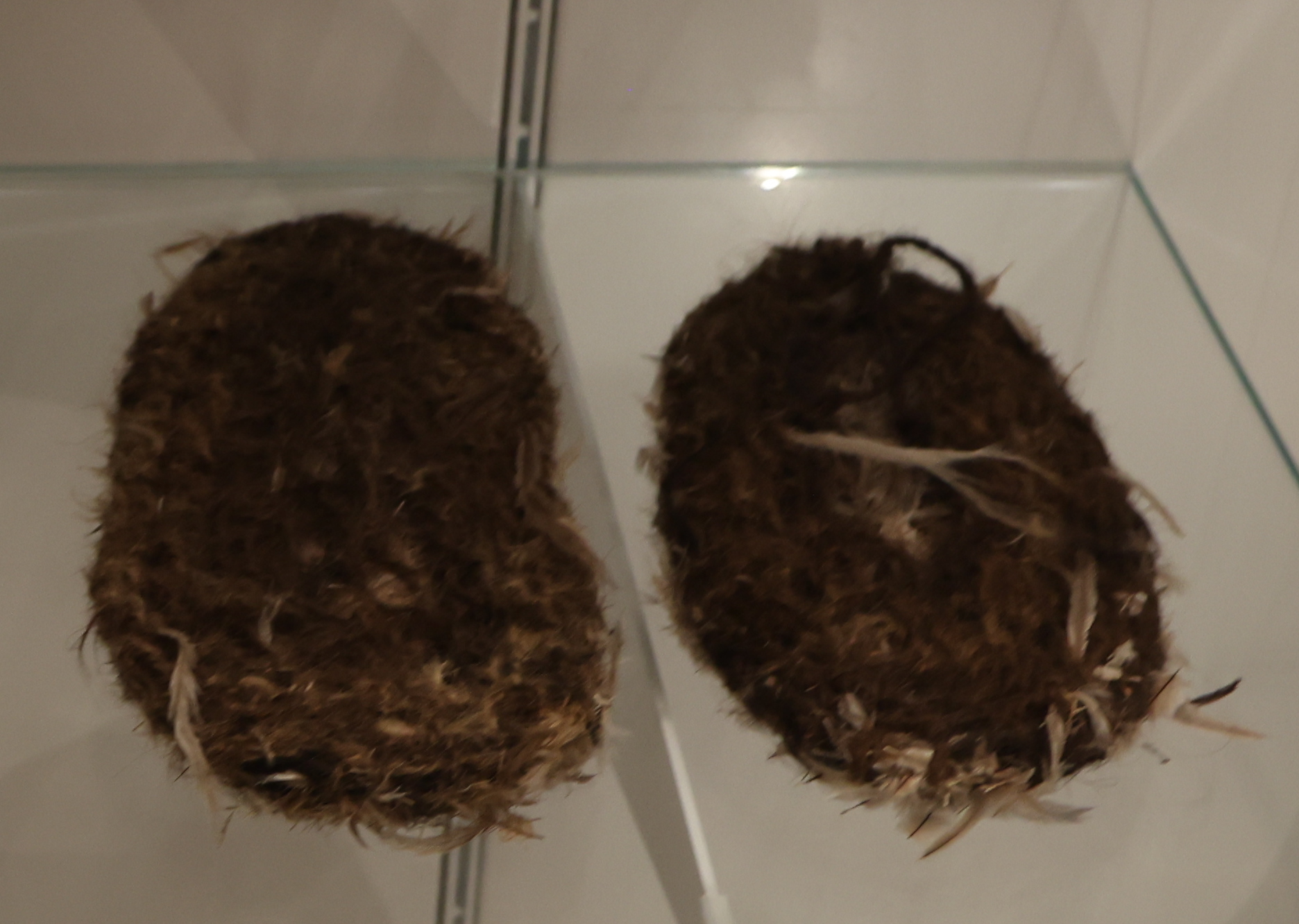
Kurdaitcha shoes displayed in the Northampton Museum

Europeans also used the name kurdaitcha (or kadaitcha) to refer to a distinctive type of oval feathered shoes, apparently worn by the kurdaitcha (man). The Indigenous names for these shoes are interlinia in northern Australia and intathurta in the south. The soles are made of emu feathers, and the uppers of human hair or animal fur. Most of the early European descriptions state that human blood was used as the principal binding agent; however Kim Akerman noted that although human blood might indeed have been used to charge the shoes with magical power (turning invisible), it is likely felting was the main method used to bind the parts together. The upper surface is covered with a net woven from human hair. An opening in the centre allows the foot to be inserted.

In some instances the shoes were allowed to be seen by women and children; in others, it was taboo for anyone but an adult man to see them. When not in use they were kept wrapped in kangaroo skin or hidden in a sacred place. Although they were permitted to be used more than once, they usually did not last more than one journey. When in use, they were decorated with lines of white and pink down and were said to leave no tracks.

Spencer and Gillen noted that the genuine kurdaitcha shoe has a small opening on one side where a dislocated big toe can be inserted. (Note: A large number of kurdaitcha shoes are in collections, however, most are too small for feet or do not have the small hole in the side. It is speculated that, due to the difficulty of their construction, many shoes are made as practice rather than to be worn.)

In 1896 Patrick Byrne, a self-taught anthropologist at Charlotte Waters telegraph station, published a paper entitled "Note on the customs connected with the use of so-called kurdaitcha shoes of Central Australia" in the Proceedings of the Royal Society of Victoria. The paper was described as a "...careful piecing together of kurdaitcha revenge technique from accounts obtained from old men in the Charlotte Waters area in 1892".

Aboriginal people also began to make kurdaitcha shoes for sale to Europeans, and Spencer and Gillen noted seeing ones that were in fact far too small to have actually been worn. Until the 1970s these shoes were a popular craft item, made to sell to visitors to many sites in the central and Western Desert areas of Australia.

== Bone pointing ==
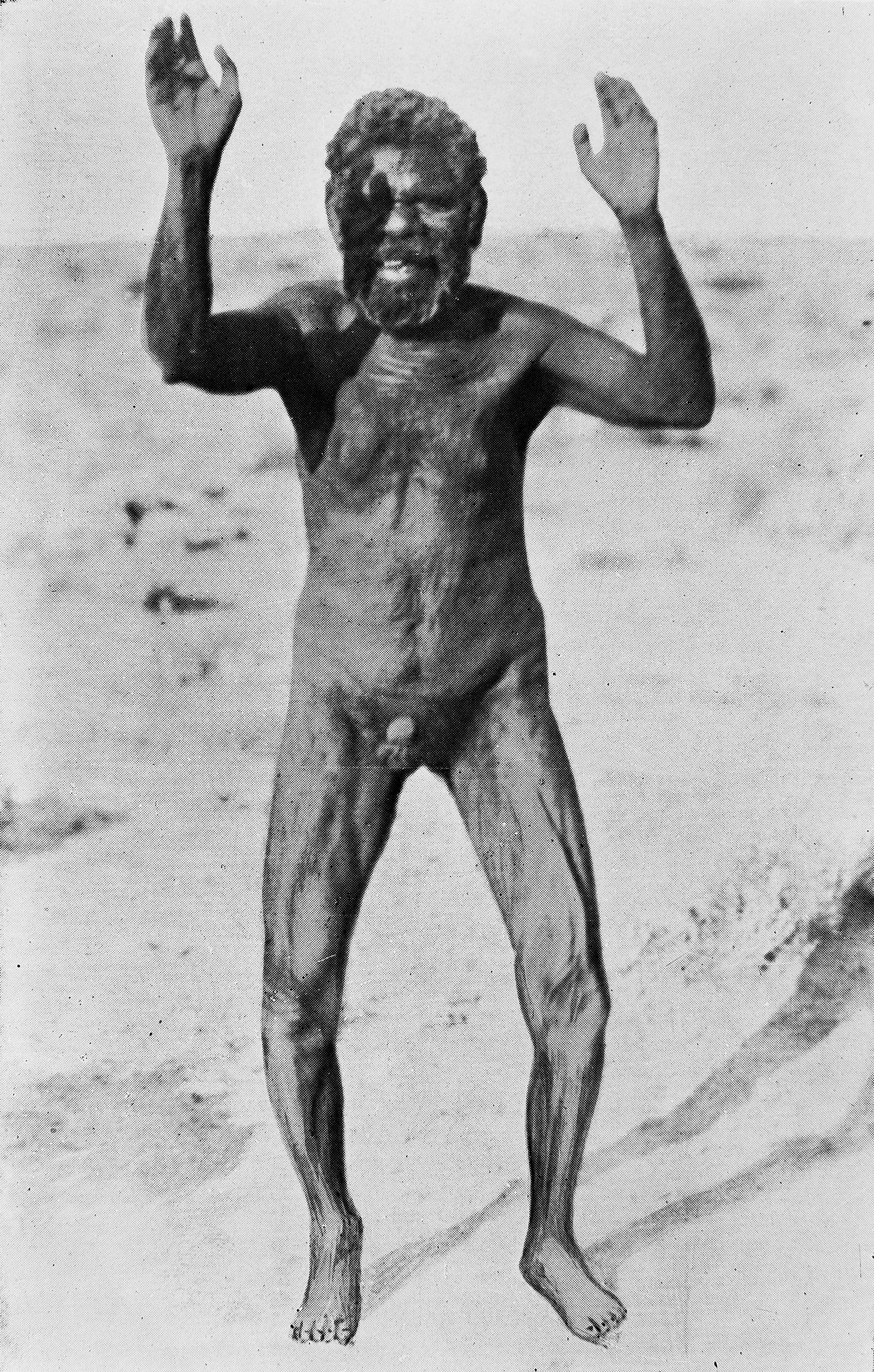
A "boned" man, of the Mirning people

The expectation that death would result from having a bone pointed at a victim is not without foundation. Other similar rituals that cause death have been recorded around the world. Victims become listless and apathetic, usually refusing food or water with death often occurring within days of being "cursed". When victims survive, it is assumed that the ritual was faulty in its execution. The phenomenon is recognised as psychosomatic in that death is caused by an emotional response—often fear—to some suggested outside force and is known as "voodoo death". As this term refers to a specific religion, the medical establishment has suggested that "self-willed death", or "bone-pointing syndrome" is more appropriate. In Australia, the practice is still common enough that hospitals and nursing staff are trained to manage illness caused by "bad spirits" and bone pointing.

=== Examples ===
The following story is related about the role of kurdaitcha by anthropologists John Godwin and Ronald Rose:

In 1953, a dying Aborigine named Kinjika was flown from Arnhem Land in Australia's Northern Territory to a hospital in Darwin. Tests revealed he had not been poisoned, injured, nor was he suffering from any sort of injury, yet he was most definitely dying. After four days of agony spent in the hospital, Kinjika died on the fifth. It was said he died of bone pointing.

"Bone pointing" is a method of execution used by the Aborigines. It is said to leave no trace, and never fails to kill its victim. The bone used in this curse is made of human, kangaroo, emu or even wood. The shape of the killing-bone, or kundela, varies from tribe to tribe. The lengths can be from six to nine inches. They look like a long needle. At the rounded end, a piece of hair is attached through the hole, and glued into place with a gummy resin. Before it can be used, the kundela is charged with a powerful psychic energy in a ritual that is kept secret from women and those who are not tribe members. To be effective, the ritual must be performed faultlessly. The bone is then given to the kurdaitcha, who are the tribe's ritual killers.

These killers then go and hunt (if the person has fled) the condemned. The name, kurdaitcha, comes from the slippers they wear while on the hunt. The slippers are made of cockatoo or emu feathers and human hair — they virtually leave no footprints. Also, they wear kangaroo hair, which is stuck to their bodies after they coat themselves in human blood and they also don masks of emu feathers. They hunt in pairs or threes and will pursue their quarry for years if necessary, never giving up until the person has been cursed.

Once the man is caught, one of the kurdaitcha goes down onto one knee and points the kundela. The victim is said to be frozen with fear and stays to hear the curse, a brief piercing chant, that the kurdaitcha chants. Then, he and his fellow hunters return to the village and the kundela is ritually burned.

The condemned man may live for several days or even weeks. But, he believes so strongly in the curse that has been uttered, that he will surely die. It is said that the ritual loading of the kundela creates a "spear of thought" which pierces the victim when the bone is pointed at him. It is as if an actual spear has been thrust at him and his death is certain.

Kinjika had been accused of an incestuous relationship (their mothers were the daughters of the same woman by different fathers). Instead of going to his trial, he fled the village. The hunters found him and cursed him. It is said that is why he died.

In 2004, an Indigenous Australian woman who disagreed with the abolition of the Aboriginal-led government body Aboriginal and Torres Strait Islander Commission cursed the Australian Prime Minister, John Howard, by pointing a bone at him.

== In popular culture ==
An act of kurdaitcha initiates both legal and cultural conflict in Peter Weir's 1977 film The Last Wave.

Kurdaitcha is featured in the 1960 Australian/British television series Whiplash episode "The Bone that Whispered".
