= Patrick Michael Byrne =

Patrick Michael Byrne may refer to:

- Patrick M. Byrne (born 1962), American entrepreneur
- Patrick Michael Byrne (anthropologist) (1856–1932), Australian telegraph operator, anthropologist and natural scientist
