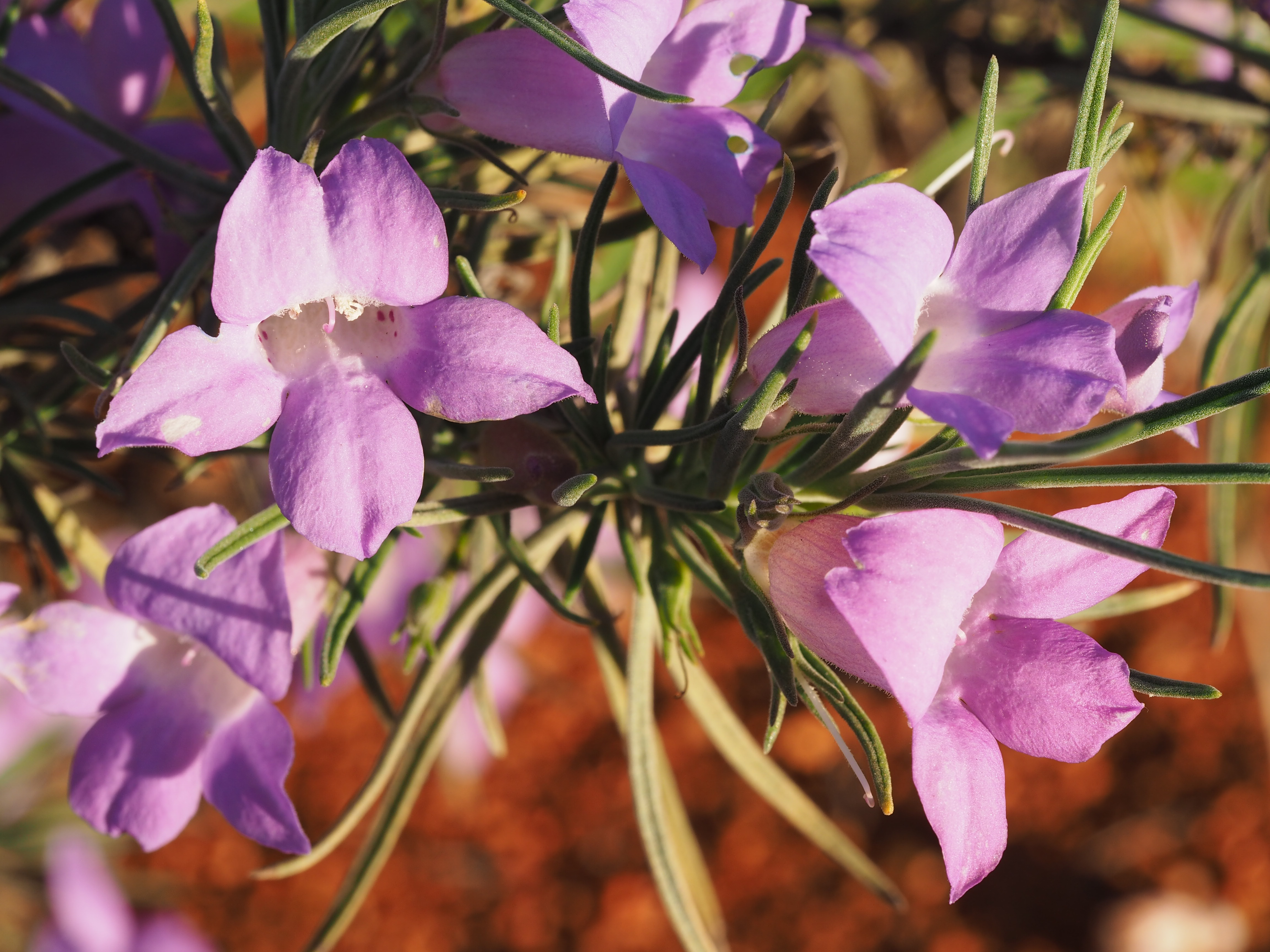
- E. foliosissima foliage and flowers

Scientific classification
- Kingdom: Plantae
- Clade: Embryophytes
- Clade: Tracheophytes
- Clade: Spermatophytes
- Clade: Angiosperms
- Clade: Eudicots
- Clade: Asterids
- Order: Lamiales
- Family: Scrophulariaceae
- Genus: Eremophila
- Species: E. foliosissima

Binomial name
- Eremophila foliosissima Kraenzlin

= Eremophila foliosissima =

Species of flowering plant

Eremophila foliosissima, commonly known as poverty bush, is a flowering plant in the figwort family, Scrophulariaceae and is endemic to Western Australia. It is a small, erect, densely foliaged shrub with long, narrow, hairy leaves and mauve to purple flowers. It is similar to Eremophila gilesii but is more dense and rounded, has more crowded leaves and has different hairs on the flowers.

== Description ==
Eremophila foliosissima is an erect, rounded, densely foliaged shrub usually growing to no more than 0.5 m (2 ft) tall with stems and leaves covered with short, stiff, curved white hairs. Older leaves usually hang down the stem, forming a thick mat over its surface. The leaves are crowded along the stems, linear in shape with a deep groove on the lower surface, mostly 40–88 mm (2–3 in) long, 1–2 mm (0.04–0.08 in) wide, usually shiny and sticky when young.

The flowers are usually borne singly in leaf axils on a hairy stalk, 4–13 mm (0.2–0.5 in) long. The 5 sepals are linear to narrow triangular in shape, hairy, especially on the outer surface and mostly 5–13.5 mm (0.2–0.5 in) long. The petals are mostly 20–40 mm (0.8–2 in) long and joined at their lower end to form a tube. The outside of the petal tube and the lobes on its end are light purple to lilac-coloured and the inside of the tube is white. The outside of the petal tube and the lobes are covered with glandular hairs, the inside of the lobes are glabrous and the inside of the tube is filled with long, soft hairs. The 4 stamens are fully enclosed in the petal tube. Flowering occurs from July to September and is followed by fruits which are oval shaped to almost spherical and 8–12 mm (0.3–0.5 in) in diameter with a pale yellow, papery covering.

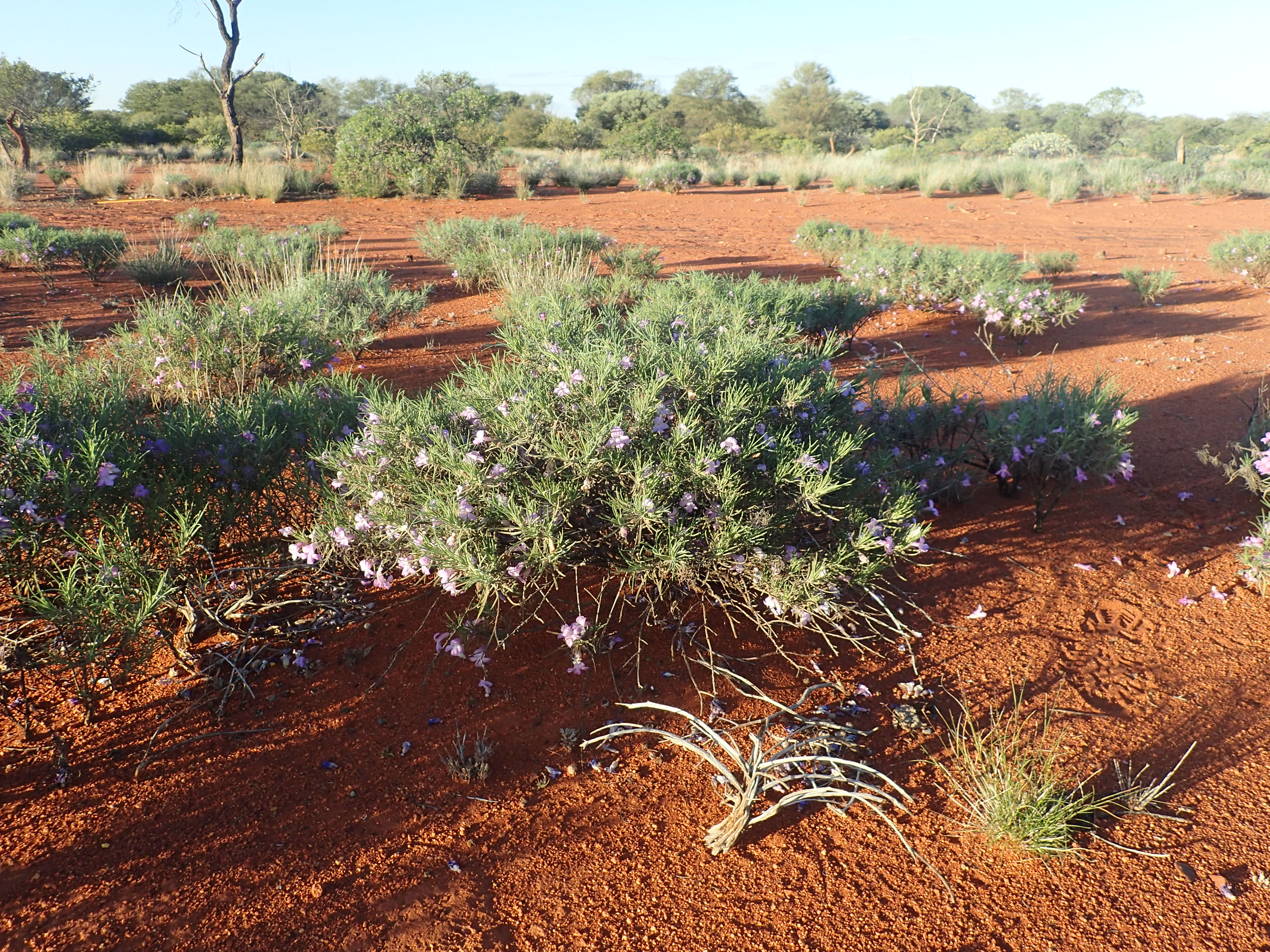
E. foliosissima growing near the middle branch of the Gascoyne River

== Taxonomy and naming ==
Eremophila foliosissima was first formally described in 1925 by Friedrich Wilhelm Ludwig Kraenzlin and the description was published in Bulletin of Miscellaneous Information. The specific epithet (foliosissima) is a Latin word meaning "leafiest".

== Distribution and habitat ==
This eremophila is widespread in and between the Shire of Murchison and Warburton in the Central Ranges, Gascoyne, Great Victoria Desert and Murchison biogeographic regions. It grows in sand, clay or loam, often in mulga woodland.

== Conservation status ==
Eremophila foliosissima is classified as "not threatened" by the Western Australian Government Department of Parks and Wildlife.

== Use in horticulture ==
Poverty bush has long, narrow greyish and slightly hairy leaves and large blue to purple flowers making it an attractive and contrasting garden plant. It is difficult to propagate from seed, cuttings or by grafting onto Myoporum species but the last of this methods is the most reliable and is best done from late summer to early autumn. The grafted forms will grow in any soil and all will grow in full sun or partial shade and will tolerate long droughts. It is damaged by severe frosts and in humid areas like Sydney needs to be grown in an area with air movement.
