= Ernest Giles =

Australian explorer (1835–1897)

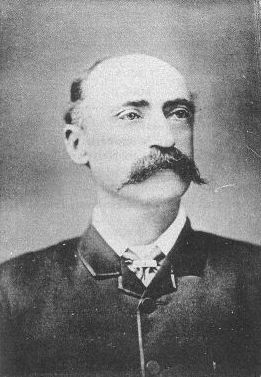
- Photo in the frontispiece of Giles' Australia Twice Traversed
- Born: William Ernest Powell Giles; 20 July 1835; Bristol, England
- Died: 13 November 1897 (aged 62); Coolgardie, Western Australia, Australia
- Resting place: Coolgardie Cemetery
- Education: Christ's Hospital, London
- Occupation: Explorer
- Awards: Patron's Medal of the Royal Geographical Society (1880); Knight of the Order of the Crown of Italy

William Ernest Powell Giles (20 July 1835 – 13 November 1897), best known as Ernest Giles, was an Australian explorer. He led five major expeditions to parts of South Australia and Western Australia.

== Early life ==
Ernest Giles was born in Bristol, England, the eldest son of William Giles (c. 1795 – 28 May 1860), a merchant, and Jane Elizabeth Giles, née Powell (c. 1804 – 15 March 1879). Their family had been in comfortable circumstances but fell on hard times and emigrated to Australia. William Giles was living in North Adelaide by 1850 and Melbourne by 1853. William was later employed by H. M. Customs in Victoria, and his wife founded a successful school for girls in that colony.

Giles was educated at Christ's Hospital school, Newgate, London. In 1850, at the age of 15, he emigrated to Australia, joining his parents in Adelaide. In 1852 Giles went to the Victorian goldfields, then became a clerk at the Post Office in Melbourne, and later at the County Court. Soon tiring of town life Giles went to the back country and gained valuable experience as a bushman. In 1865, he explored north-west of the Darling River in the Yancannia Range looking for pastoral country and land capable of cultivating hemp, as it was valuable for rope at the time.

== Exploration ==
=== First Expedition ===
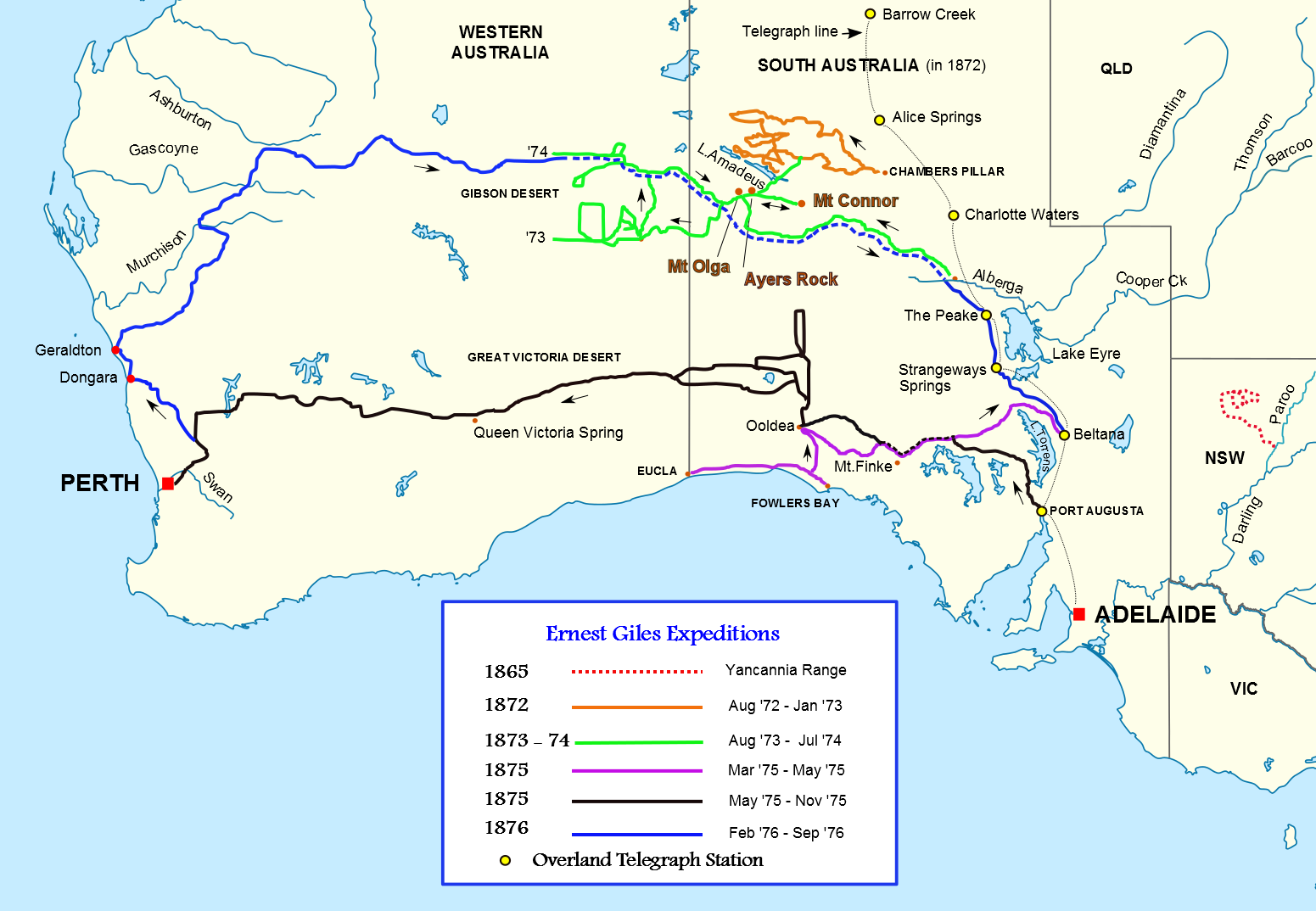
Map of routes taken by Ernest Giles

Giles did not attempt an organised expedition until 22 August 1872, when he left Chambers Pillar with two other men and traversed much uncharted country to the north-west and west, along the Finke River, through the Krichauff Range and then to Mount Udor. He then turned south, encountering a freshwater spring surrounded by caves filled with Aboriginal rock art. Giles denigrated the paintings, stating they were childish manifestations created by "reptile-eating Troglodytes". A member of his group, Samuel Carmichael, then proceeded to vandalise the rock drawings "with a few choice specimens of the white man's art".

Finding their way barred by Lake Amadeus and that their horses were getting very weak, they decided to return. Giles viewed Kata Tjuta from Lake Amadeus, which he named Mount Olga after the Queen of Spain. His group returned to Charlotte Waters and then to Adelaide.

Giles was the first European to see the rock formations named The Olgas, now officially known by Kata Tjuta/Mount Olga, and Lake Amadeus. He had wanted to name these Mt Mueller and Lake Ferdinand respectively, to honour his benefactor Baron Ferdinand von Mueller, however Mueller prevailed on him to instead honour the King Amadeus of Spain and Queen Olga of Württemberg. Giles was beaten to viewing Uluru by a competing explorer, William Gosse.

=== Second expedition ===
Here they encountered and had a skirmish with a group of Aboriginal men. Giles and his men fired their rifles and shotguns at them, but didn't state how many were killed or wounded.

On 14 September, Giles reached Mount Olga. Giles named the desert Gibson Desert after his companion.

Giles recovered at the base camp in the Rawlinson Ranges where he found out that his fellow expeditioners had shot a number of local Aboriginal men while he was away with Gibson. Giles praised their actions stating that his men "had a most fortunate escape from...these animals".

By June, they had returned to Mount Olga and visited the nearby Uluru rock formation where they had a brief but friendly encounter with some Indigenous people.

=== Third expedition ===
This involved travelling across the Nullarbor Plain to Eucla and then exploring inland and east to Elder's cattle station at Beltana near Lake Torrens.

After arriving in Eucla, Giles' group proceeded northwards from Fowler's Bay. They were guided by an old Wirangu man named Jimmy who led them first to the Ooldea soak. Using a sand map, Jimmy then showed Giles five waterholes that could be utilised on their journey east through very dry country. Jimmy safely guided the group 120 miles east to his childhood home at Wynbring rockhole where he introduced Giles to some of his kinspeople. Giles was amazed at Jimmy's knowledge and ability, and his disregard for Aboriginal people was lessened.

Jimmy knew nothing of the country further east and Giles led the group into a waterless tract of land. After eight days travel, which killed several of their horses and drove some of the expeditioners to delirium, they found a waterhole near Lake Torrens, and were then safely able to reach Elder's station at Beltana.

=== Fourth expedition ===
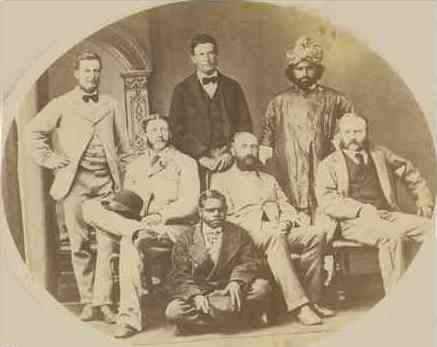
The party for Giles' fourth expedition

At Beltana the preparations for his fourth journey were made, in which Giles wished to proceed from South Australia to the coast of Western Australia through an unexplored area. With Tietkens again his lieutenant, and a caravan of camels, a start was made in early May. Afghan cameleer Mahomet Saleh, who had accompanied explorer Peter Warburton to Western Australia two years previously, drove and managed the camels. They reached Port Augusta on 23 May and retraced Giles journey back to Wynbring and Ooldea following a generally westerly course. The journey was better than his previous expeditions as the camels were far more attuned to the dry conditions than horses, of which many had cruel deaths on his first two expeditions.

Near Fowler's Bay, Jimmy, after discovering his daughters had died of an epidemic there, decided to leave the group. An 18 year old Mirning man named Tommy Oldham then acted as the main guide. They travelled north and then west, occasionally finding water in small dams around waterholes made by local Aboriginal people. They continued west into the desert and after journeying a further 17 days and 323 miles (520 km) without water, Tommy Oldham found an abundant supply in a small hollow between sand dunes at a location which Giles subsequently named Queen Victoria Spring, and the party was saved. The large desert that surrounded the spring, Giles called the Great Victoria Desert.

After a week's rest, the journey was resumed on 6 October, still heading west. Ten days later the expedition encountered a group of Kalamaia people at Ularring. Giles enjoyed a "peaceful and happy" few days with these people until he felt threatened by a large group of men approaching in a ceremonial fashion. Giles ordered his men to attack this group, and despite the pleas from the children who were in the camp to desist, they fired on them with shotguns and Snider-Enfield rifles. Several were killed and wounded, and Giles made a bonfire of the spears and boomerangs that belonged to the people he afterwards derided as "reptiles".

They then left Ularring and on 4 November they met a white stockman at Tootra out-camp, east of Bindi Bindi, Western Australia. Their course was west to Walebing Station, then south-west and on 11 November they arrived at New Norcia where they were welcomed by Bishop Salvado. On 17 November 1875 the party arrived at Guildford, and at Perth the next day, where they received an enthusiastic reception.

=== Fifth expedition ===
Giles stayed for two months at Perth, enjoying the public attention, while Tietkens and Jess Young, another member of the expedition, went back to Adelaide by sea. Giles wished to complete another expedition by going north and inland from the Western Australian coast, through the Gibson Desert and returning to Adelaide via central Australia. On 13 January 1876 Giles began the journey accompanied by Tommy Oldham, Alec Ross, Saleh, Peter Nicholls and the camels. They arrived at Geraldton before heading inland. At the Cheangwa outstation, leased by Edward Wittenoom, a large group of young Badimaya women attached themselves to the expedition until they reached the Murchison River. Giles described them as a "harem" of naked and "exceedingly pretty" girls. It has been claimed that Giles was the father of least one child born to an Aboriginal mother while he was on his expeditions.

They met with a large group of friendly Wajarri people near the Gascoyne River who asked Giles in broken English if he would take them to Melbourne. The request was politely declined and the expedition continued. Giles' eyes became infected with Chlamydia trachomatis and he was temporarily blinded while travelling through some hills he subsequently called Ophthalmia Range.

They headed east through the Gibson Desert and then mostly followed his previous expedition's path through the Musgrave Ranges to Beltana in South Australia. This immense journey was made without the difficulties of some of his previous expeditions, largely due to the endurance of his camels and the skill of the cameleer Saleh. They arrived at Adelaide in September 1876.

== Late life and legacy ==
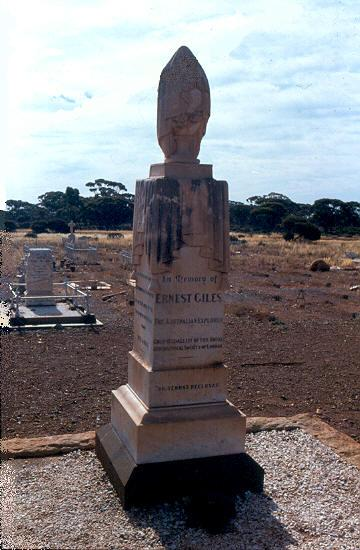
Giles' grave at Coolgardie, Western Australia

Giles worked as a land classifier in the Western District of Victoria from 1877 to 1879.

In 1880 he published The Journal of a Forgotten Expedition, an account of his second and third expeditions, then, in 1889, appeared Australia Twice Traversed: The Romance of Exploration. Giles was made a fellow and awarded the Patron's Medal (Note: Contemporary reports in the Australian press have Giles receiving the (more prestigious) Founder's medal) of the Royal Geographical Society in 1880 and was made Cavaliere dell'Ordine della Corona d'Italia (Knight of the Order of the Crown of Italy) by King Vittorio Emanuele II. He made a number of other minor journeys, including an expedition to the Everard Ranges in 1882 where again he shot at a group of Aboriginal people killing at least one person.

Despite his explorations, the various Australian governments at the time turned their respective backs on his achievements once they had been completed, and refused to patronise any further exploits or give him much in the way of financial reward. Governor Sir William Jervois claimed on 11 October 1881, "I am informed that he gambles and that his habits are not always strictly sober".

After a short illness Giles died of pneumonia at his nephew's house in Coolgardie on 13 November 1897 and was buried at the Coolgardie Cemetery. He was unmarried. It was reported at the time:

He has left behind a name that will be long remembered and held in honor as one who had devoted the best years of his life to one of the noblest causes that man can engage".

H. H. Finlayson in The Red Centre: man and beast in the heart of Australia (1935) said of Giles:

All who have worked in that country since Giles's time have felt both admiration and astonishment at the splendid horsecraft, the endurance, and the unwavering determination with which these explorations were carried through ... To read Giles's simple account of those terrible rides into the unknown on dying horses with an unrelieved diet of dried horse for weeks at a time, with the waters behind dried out and those ahead still to find, is to marvel at the character and strength of the motive which could hold a man constant in such a course.

In 1976 he was honoured on a postage stamp bearing his portrait issued by Australia Post.

Mount Giles, the third highest mountain in the Northern Territory; Lake Giles, 160 km (100 mi) north of Southern Cross, Western Australia; and the Giles Weather Station, near the Western Australian-South Australian border, were named after him.

== Family ==
His parents were William Giles (c. 1795 – 28 May 1860) of HM Customs, Victoria and Jane Elizabeth Giles, née Powell (c. 1804 – 15 March 1879).

He had five sisters, one of these was Jane Rebecca Giles, and the George Gill Range was named by Giles in honour of her husband. His other sisters included Helen Sarah Giles, Harriet Eliza Giles, and Alice Mary Giles.

His brother was Robert Eugene Giles of Hamilton, Victoria, who accepted the Royal Geographical Society medal on his brother's behalf. He was later jailed for misappropriation while trustee, before moving to Adelaide, from where he continued to promote his brother's memory.

Ernest Giles was not related to another explorer Alfred Giles, though they knew each other professionally.

== Plant names ==
The unrelated Christopher Giles (c. 1841–1917) assisted Giles's 1872–73 and 1873–74 expeditions, collecting plants for von Mueller in the region of Charlotte Waters. Specimens collected by E. Giles are cared for at the National Herbarium of Victoria (MEL), Royal Botanic Gardens Victoria.

- The genus Gilesia, which contains one species, Gilesia biniflora F.Muell, the western tar-vine, is named for both Christopher and Ernest Giles.
- Cyperus gilesii and Panicum gilesii are usually listed as honouring Ernest Giles, but the type details for both species are given by George Bentham only as "Central Australia. Charlotte Waters, Giles".
- Christopher Giles was honoured in the species Eremophila christopheri, the dolomite fuchsia bush, whereas the desert fuchsia, Eremophila gilesii, which is widespread across the region, honours Ernest.
- A species of wattle, Acacia gilesiana, is named for Ernest Giles.

== See also ==
- Exploration of Australia
