= Acacia gilesiana =

Giles' wattle

Scientific classification
- Kingdom: Plantae
- Clade: Tracheophytes
- Clade: Angiosperms
- Clade: Eudicots
- Clade: Rosids
- Order: Fabales
- Family: Fabaceae
- Subfamily: Caesalpinioideae
- Clade: Mimosoid clade
- Genus: Acacia
- Species: A. gilesiana

Binomial name
- Acacia gilesiana F.Muell.
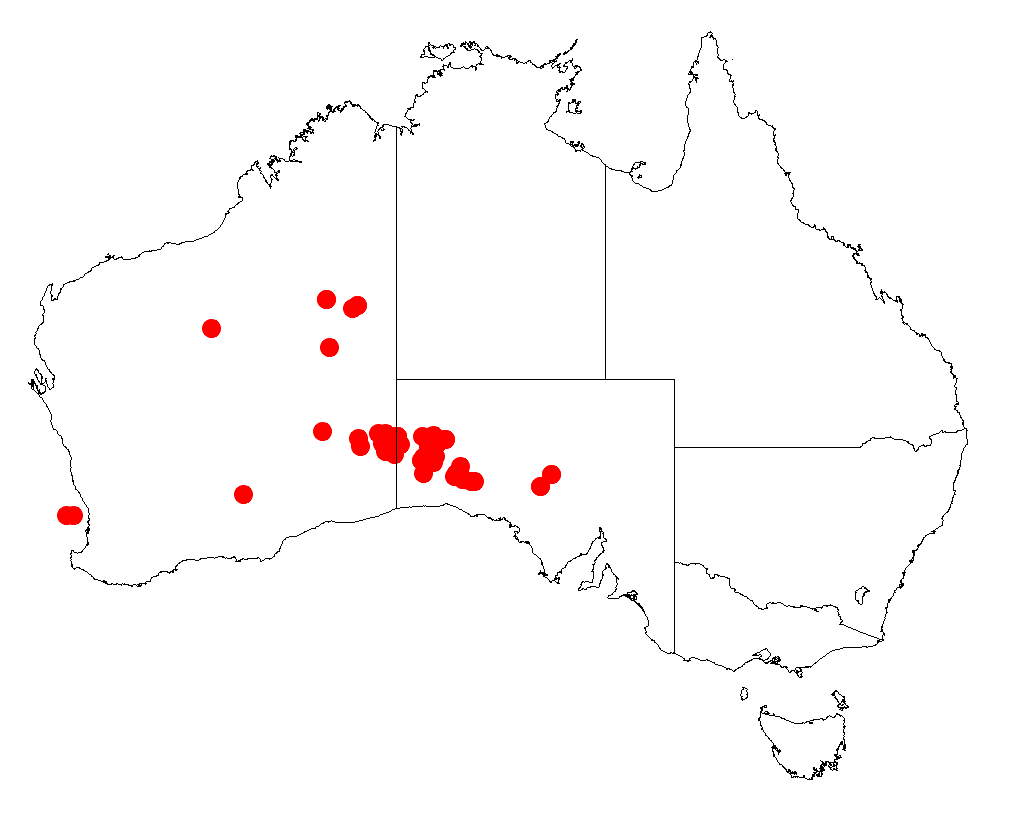
- Occurrence data from AVH

Synonyms
- Racosperma gilesianum (F.Muell.) Pedley

Species of legume

Acacia gilesiana, commonly known as Giles' wattle, is a species of flowering plant in the family Fabaceae and is endemic to arid parts of south-western Australia. It is an erect, spreading, glabrous shrub with ascending to erect, rigid, terete phyllodes, spherical heads of golden yellow flowers and narrowly oblong, leathery pods, slightly constricted between the seeds.

== Description ==
Acacia gilesiana is an erect, spreading, glabrous shrub that typically grows to a height of 2–3 m (6 ft 7 in – 9 ft 10 in) and has terete branchlets that are slightly ribbed at first. Its phyllodes are ascending to erect, straight to slightly curved, 50–240 mm (2.0–9.4 in) long and 1.5–1.8 mm (0.059–0.071 in) in diameter with usually eight yellowish veins. The flowers are borne in two to eight spherical heads in axils in racemes 25–30 mm (0.98–1.18 in) long on peduncles 10–20 mm (0.39–0.79 in) long, each head 5–6 mm (0.20–0.24 in) in diameter with 20 to 37 golden yellow flowers. Flowering occurs in July and August, and the pods are narrowly oblong, slightly curved, flat and up to 130 mm (5.1 in) long, 10–15 mm (0.39–0.59 in) wide, leathery and slightly constricted between the seeds. The seeds are broadly elliptic, about 6 mm (0.24 in) long and lack an aril.

== Taxonomy ==
Acacia gilesiana was first formally described in 1882 by Ferdinand von Mueller in The Chemist and Druggist with Australasian Supplement from specimens collected by Ernest Giles near Mount Eba. The specific epithet, gilesiana, honours Ernest Giles.

== Distribution and habitat ==
Giles' wattle mostly grows in deep red sand in low woodland and tall shrubland from the Neale Junction in the Coolgardie, Gibson Desert, Great Victoria Desert and Little Sandy Desert of Western Australia to Maralinga in South Australia with the type locality 300 km (190 mi) further east. It often grows with often in association with mulga and spinifex.

== See also ==
- List of Acacia species
