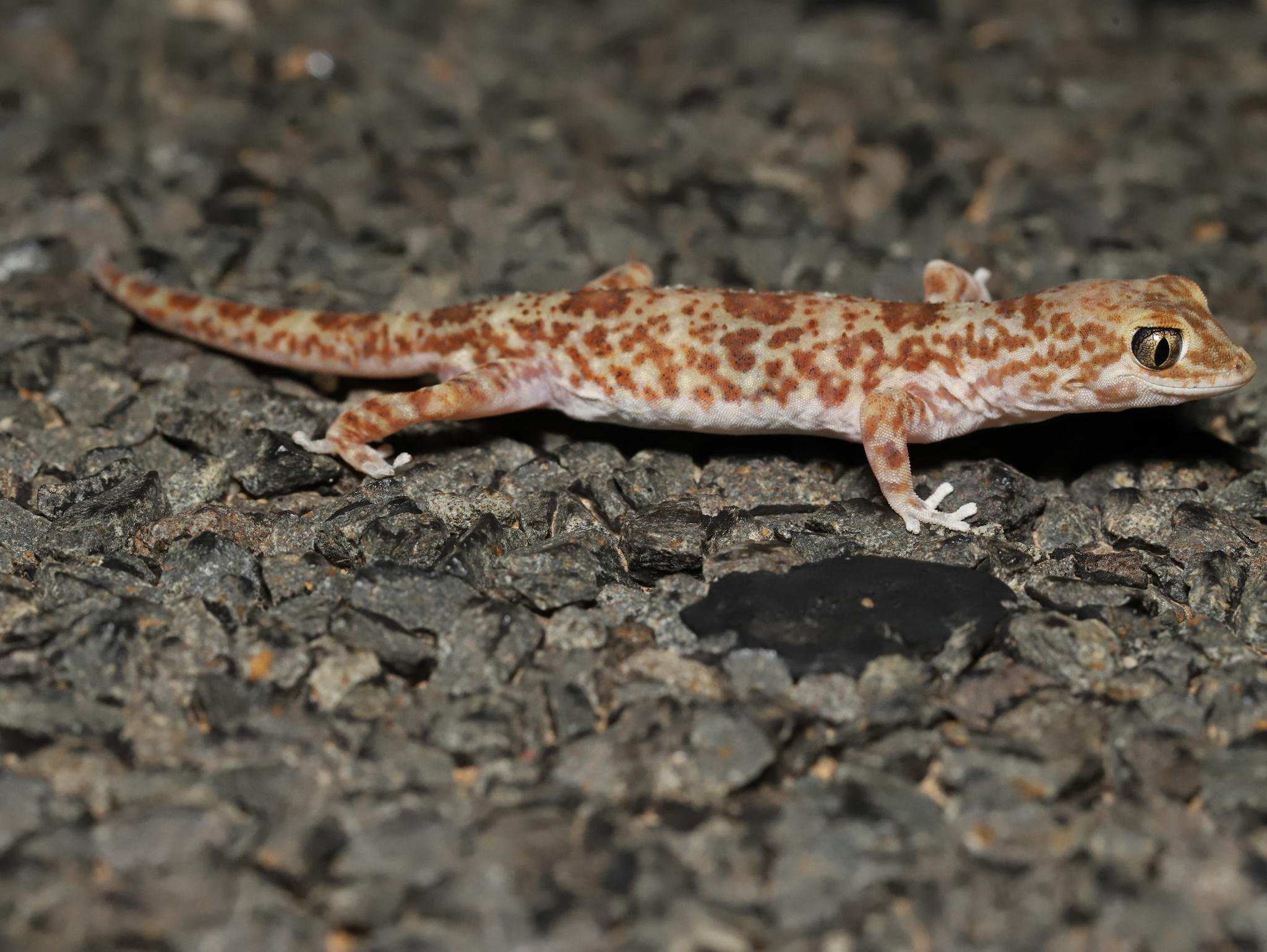

Conservation status
- Least Concern (IUCN 3.1)

Scientific classification
- Kingdom: Animalia
- Phylum: Chordata
- Class: Reptilia
- Order: Squamata
- Suborder: Gekkota
- Family: Diplodactylidae
- Genus: Lucasium
- Species: L. byrnei

Binomial name
- Lucasium byrnei (A. H. S. Lucas & C. Frost, 1896)

Synonyms
- Diplodactylus byrnei A. H. S. Lucas & C. Frost, 1896; Lucasium byrnei — P. Oliver et al., 2007

= Lucasium byrnei =

Species of lizard

Lucasium byrnei, also known commonly as the gibber gecko, Byrne's gecko, and the pink-blotched gecko, is a species of small, nocturnal lizard in the family Diplodactylidae. The species is endemic to Australia.

== Etymology ==
The specific name, byrnei, is in honour of Australian telegraph official P.M. "Paddy" Byrne.

== Appearance ==
Up to 80 mm (3.1 in) in total length (including tail), the gibber gecko is a pale, creamy-fawn to reddish-brown or dark brown colour above, with scattered darker flecks and spots and some tiny pale dots, and usually with a distinct series of four or five conspicuous, irregular, W-shaped dark brown transverse bars or blotches between nape and hindlimbs.

It has a short, convex head with a rounded snout; the ear-opening is very small and rounded. Its rostral scale is very low and is about four times as broad as high, without a median cleft. Scales on the throat are minute and granular, whereas abdominal scales are flat, roundish, juxtaposed, and a little smaller than the dorsal tubercles. The gibber gecko's tail is cylindrical and tapering, with rings of scales that are convex above and flat and subquadrangular beneath. The male of the species has three or four blunt spines on each side of the base of the tail.

== Habitat ==
The gibber gecko is terrestrial, hiding in ground litter, holes and ground crevices during the day, and emerging at night to forage in open areas. It is found in a wide range of habitats from mallee and open woodland to saltbush and sandy desert. Due to the delicate surface architecture of its apical plates, it is considered unlikely that the gibber gecko would actively burrow, and instead it would be expected to be restricted to occupying previously excavated burrows or other retreats.

== Geographic range ==
The gibber gecko is found in central New South Wales and its southern interior, the eastern half of South Australia, and extending into adjacent border regions of Queensland and the Northern Territory.

== Diet ==
The gibber gecko is insectivorous, with its natural diet comprising small spiders, ants, cockroaches, crickets, termites, and moths.

== Taxonomy ==
The family Gekkonidae comprises 111 species in Australia which are normally no larger than 150 mm (5.9 in) in snout-to-vent length (SVL) with five digits that bear circular toe pads. The family is separated into two subfamilies: Gekkoninae and Diplodactylinae. These subfamilies are further broken down into many genera, of which the following genera are found in Australia: Diplodactylus, Gehyra, Hemidactylus, Heteronotia, Lepidodactylus, Nactus, Nephrurus, Oedura, Phyllurus, Pseudothecadactylus, Rhynchoedura, Saltuarius, Strophurus, and Underwoodisaurus. The gibber gecko was originally described by Arthur Henry Shakespeare Lucas and Charles Frost in 1896 as Diplodactylus byrnei in the subfamily Diplodactylinae and further in the genus Diplodactylus which can be identified by the lack of caudal glands, the presence of small, retractable claws, and digits that lie flat on the ground.
