= Native Tribes of Central Australia =

Native Tribes of Central Australia is an 1899 anthropology book by Baldwin Spencer and Francis James Gillen. In it, Spencer and Gillen describe the customs, traditions and ceremonies of the Arrernte people and other neighbouring Aboriginal Australian groups. The authors were among the first to write about Australian Aboriginal religion and mythology including The Dreaming.

The book was an academic and popular success. It was commended by James George Frazer, and influenced later works such as Elementary Forms of Religious Life and Totem and Taboo.
