= Felix Giles (engineer) =

Australian engineer and military officer

- Born: 23 November 1885; Darwin, Northern Territory
- Died: 22 June 1950 (aged 64); Blackwood, South Australia
- Relatives: Alfred Giles (father)
- Military career
- Allegiance: Australia
- Branch: Citizen Military Forces; Australian Imperial Force
- Service years: 1908–1926
- Rank: Lieutenant Colonel
- Unit: 10th Battalion
- Conflicts: First World War; Gallipoli campaign; Landing at Anzac Cove; Third attack on Anzac Cove; Evacuation of Gallipoli; Western Front; Battle of the Somme; Battle of Pozières; Battle of Mouquet Farm
- Awards: Distinguished Service Order; Volunteer Officers' Decoration; Mentioned in Despatches
- Other work: Engineer

Felix Gordon Giles, DSO, VD (23 November 1885 — 22 June 1950) was an Australian engineer and army officer who served in the First World War.

== Early life and education ==
Giles was born in Darwin, Northern Territory, on 23 November 1885 to Alfred Giles and Mary Augusta Giles (née Sprigg). He was educated at St Peter's College, Adelaide and passed a three-year course at the School of Mines in electrical engineering. Giles married Elsie Kilpack on 24 July 1909. He worked for the electrical branch of the General Post Office and later the Adelaide Electric Lighting and Traction Company.

== Military career ==
Giles enlisted in the South Australian Scottish Infantry in May 1908 and rose through the ranks. He was promoted to corporal in March 1910, to sergeant in September 1910 and was commissioned a second lieutenant on 21 August 1911. After the outbreak of the First World War, Giles volunteered for the Australian Imperial Force and was assigned command of the 10th Battalion's G Company. In January 1915, when his company was merged with D Company, Giles became second-in-command of the company.

Giles was promoted to captain in September 1914. He participated in the Gallipoli campaign, assuming command of D Company when the company commander was wounded. He was one of only four officers within the 3rd Brigade to serve continuously from the first landing to the evacuation.

In March 1916, Giles was promoted to major. At the Battle of Pozières he was gassed and suffered multiple concussions from near misses of high explosive shells. He persisted and led his men into defensive positions, conduct that brought him the second recommendation for the Distinguished Service Order (DSO). His coolness under fire was praised by his fellow officers. In January 1917, Giles suffered from shell shock after being wounded during a reconnaissance. His conduct at the capture of Le Barque, where he harassed the German rearguard during their withdrawal, earned him a mention in despatches on 9 April 1917, and later that year he was awarded the DSO for "services rendered in the prosecution of the war".

After the war Giles resumed his civilian work as an electrical engineer. He became a meter superintendent with the Adelaide Electric Supply Company.
