= Patrick Michael Byrne (anthropologist) =

Australian anthropologist (1856–1932)

- Born: 1856; Limerick, Ireland
- Died: 1932 (aged 75–76); Australia
- Scientific career
- Fields: Anthropologist, telegraphist, natural scientist

Notes
- Self-taught

Patrick Michael Byrne (1856–1932), also known as Paddy or Pado, was an Australian telegraph operator, anthropologist and natural scientist who worked at the remote Charlotte Waters telegraph station in central Australia for 50 years. He was a keen self-taught scientist who collected specimens and corresponded extensively with biologist and anthropologist Walter Baldwin Spencer. He also worked with anthropologist Francis James Gillen at Charlotte Waters, and was a friend of and advocate for the local Arrernte people.

The scientific name of the small marsupial known as the kowari is Dasyuroides byrnei, in recognition of his work.

== Life ==
=== Early life ===
Byrne was born in Limerick, Ireland, son of a Catherine Byrne (née Hayes) and Michael Byrne. After his father's death in about 1864, Patrick's mother Catherine emigrated to Melbourne. It is not known whether she took the young Patrick with her, or he followed at a later date.

After commencing work at the Charlotte Waters telegraph station as a telegraphist as a teenager, he worked there for about 50 years, nicknaming the place "Bleak House", which he used in his letterhead.

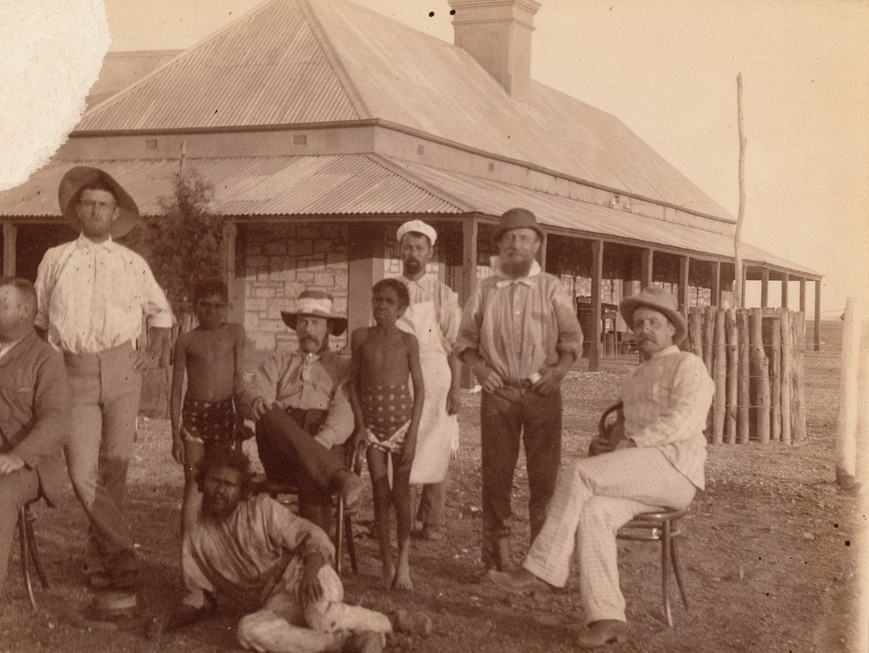
Telegraph Station, c.1880, Paddy Byrne on right

Byrne has been identified as the man on the right in the photograph of a group of people outside the telegraph station.

=== Career ===
He was step-brother to Amelia Gillen, wife of Francis (Frank) Gillen, who was also stationed at Charlotte Waters from 1875 to 1892. Both men largely educated themselves by means of reading prolifically.

Byrne collected ethnographic and natural history specimens, conducting field work amongst and with the local Indigenous Arrernte people. He corresponded extensively with anthropologist Sir Walter Baldwin Spencer, whom he met at the time of the Horn Expedition of 1894. Byrne was not formally educated or trained in science, but his deep interest led him to educate himself as he collected raw data and specimens to be sent to Baldwin in Melbourne. Baldwin later paid tribute to Byrne for "his generosity and long friendship...[and]...invaluable help in my Zoological work."

Byrne's letters show that he encouraged the local women to catch animals for Spencer, which included specimens of new species. Spencer encouraged Byrne's scientific interests and reading, and Byrne was an evolutionist, who read and included a well-reasoned critique of Alfred Russel Wallace's 1889 book, Darwinism, in his letters.

In 1896 a paper entitled "Note on the customs connected with the use of so called kurdaitcha shoes of Central Australia", written by Byrne and described as "A careful piecing together of kurdaitcha revenge technique from accounts obtained from old men in the Charlotte Waters area in 1892" was published in the Proceedings of the Royal Society of Victoria.

He also proved himself to be a good field geologist, discovering evidence for Permian glaciation (about 250 million years ago), which was subsequently confirmed by Edgeworth David.

It was Byrne who suggested that Spencer and Gillen take "a first-class black boy" with them on their 1901-1902 expedition across Australia in 1901. They took Arrernte artist Erlikilyika (known as Jim Kite) and a man called Parunda, also known as Warwick. Byrne is mentioned in Erlikilyika's biographical entry in the Australian Dictionary of Biography as appreciating his skills and talent, and Erlikilyika proved himself to be a true research assistant, being the only one who understood the local Kaytetye language.

Byrne was also reportedly a blacksmith, and buried his dog at the back of the building in a small grave surrounded by ironwork railings, which still exists.

=== Later life ===
Byrne grew old at Charlotte Waters. Following his retirement, he supervised the bore water pump, until his right hand had to be amputated as the result of an accident with the machinery, after a four-day trip to get to the hospital at Oodnadatta.

In his final letter to Spencer in 1925, Byrne wrote:

Whatever the past hides, the present of the unfortunate Aborigine is sufficiently miserable, Native food of any description is almost non-existent, and ... the rations issued to the old natives are insufficient... In addition, our Missionaries undermine their authority, and ridicule their traditions, we take from them everything that makes life worth living, work them until they can work no longer, and then hand them over to the police, whose main endeavour is to work things as cheaply as possible, and thus please a Gov't that has neither knowledge nor conscience. It is a despicable crime.

Byrne died on or before 8 March 1932, in the Northern Territory.

== Legacy ==
Spencer named a small marsupial found by Byrne and known locally as the kowari (also known as Byrne's marsupial mouse) in recognition of Byrne's contribution, as Dasyuroides byrnei in 1896, and Byrne's work continues to contribute to scientists' understanding of central Australian mammals. Byrne is commemorated in the scientific name of a species of Australian gecko, Lucasium byrnei.
