= Francis James Gillen =

Australian anthropologist (1855–1912)

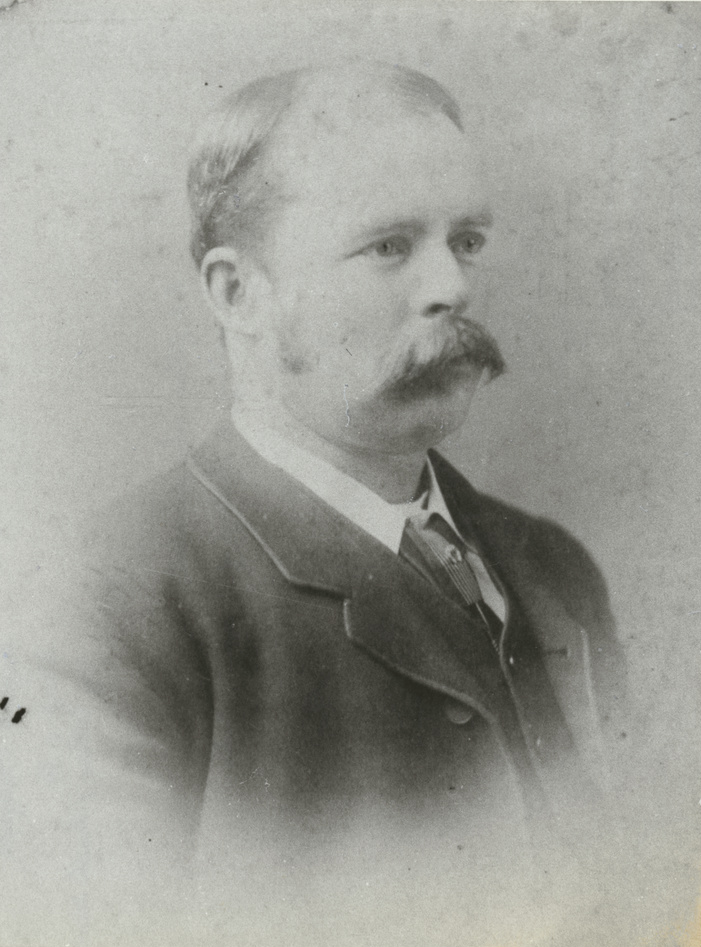
- Born: 28 October 1855; Little Para, South Australia
- Died: 5 June 1912 (aged 56); Woodville, South Australia, Australia
- Scientific career
- Fields: Anthropologist, ethnologist

Francis James Gillen (28 October 1855 – 5 June 1912), also known as Frank Gillen and F. J. Gillen, was an early Australian anthropologist and ethnologist. He is known for his work with W. Baldwin Spencer, including their seminal work The Native Tribes of Central Australia (1899). They both worked in central Australia, where Gillen was employed as a telegraph station master, with the Arrernte people and other Indigenous Australians.

== Life and career ==
Francis James Gillen was born on 28 October 1855 at Little Para, South Australia, the eldest son of Thomas Gillen and Bridget (née McCan). He was also known as Frank.

He entered the public service in 1867, and was employed as a postal messenger at Clare. He was transferred to Adelaide in 1871 where his duties also included telegraph operation. In 1875, Gillen was employed on the Australian Overland Telegraph Line, and was stationed at Charlotte Waters telegraph station from 1875 to 1892, during which time he recorded various Aboriginal words and phrases and travelled to other nearby Telegraph stations, including the Peake.

He was appointed the Alice Springs post and telegraph Station Master in 1892. At the time Alice Springs was part of South Australia and Gillen, who by virtue of his office held the collateral positions of Special Magistrate and sub-Protector of Aborigines, was effectively the administrator of central Australia.

During his time at Alice Springs he became involved with Aboriginal Australians and in 1894 assisted the Horn Scientific Expedition to Central Australia, soon after which he met Walter Baldwin Spencer. After witnessing and documenting the Engwura festival – a series of public and restricted ceremonies performed by Arrernte people men in 1896 – they worked together to write The Native Tribes of Central Australia (1899). The German anthropologist Moritz von Leonhardi was very much inspired by this publication. Later, together with Carl Strehlow Leonhardi partly opposed Gillen's and Spencer's theses.

In 1900 Gillen was elected president of the anthropological section of the Australasian Association for the Advancement of Science held at Melbourne.

In this journey, the Arrernte artist Erlikilyika (also known as Jim Kite) acted as their guide, interpreter and research assistant. Their journey led to the publication of The Northern Tribes of Central Australia (1904).

Gillen's final fieldwork endeavour with Spencer was to the old Peake station, South Australia, where they camped for a number of weeks gathering further information on Arabanna people for inclusion on their 1904 publication. Gillen was also listed as a co-author of Spencer's The Arunta published in 1927.

=== Family ===
His wife, formerly Amelia Besley of Mount Gambier (and step-sister to "Pado" Byrne, telegraph master and scientist at Charlotte Waters for 50 years), three daughters and two sons survived him.

== Legacy ==
John Mulvaney, considered the "father of Australian archaeology", described The Native Tribes of Central Australia (by Spencer and Gillen, with input from collaborators Paddy Byrne, telegraphist at Charlotte Waters, and Ernest Cowle, police officer at Illumurta Springs) as "one of Australia's most influential books in the history of ideas".

Varanus gilleni, a species of Australian monitor lizard commonly known as the pygmy mulga monitor, is named in his honour. The Centralian Tree Frog Ranoidea gilleni, is also named for him.

== Selected works ==
- Spencer, Walter Baldwin; Gillen, Francis James (1899). The Native Tribes of Central Australia. London: Macmillan. Was available in eBooks@Adelaide from 2014 to 2020.
- Gillen, Robert F, ed. (1995). 'F.J. Gillen's FIRST DIARY 1875'. Wakefield Press.
- Mulvaney, John; Morphy, Howard; Petch, Alison (editors) (1997). My Dear Spencer: The Letters of F. J. Gillen to Baldwin Spencer. South Melbourne: Hyland House. 554 pp. 2001. ISBN 978-1864470222.
