= Felix "Nighthawk" Giles =

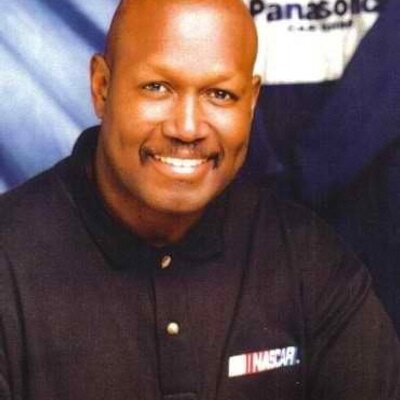

Felix Giles (born in Cleveland, Ohio), nicknamed "Nighthawk", is an American former NASCAR driver who became the first Black driver to participate in the NASCAR Craftsman Truck Series, most notably becoming the first African-American to race in the Baja 1000 Offroad Desert Race in Baja, Mexico. Giles was also the first African American NASCAR driver in the sport since Wendell Scott in the 1960s. Giles has a legacy as one who helped break through the barrier for African-Americans participating in the motorsport scene as it was a predominately white dominated sport during his early years as a race driver. For his efforts in paving the way for African Americans in motorsports, he was honored on the Floor of Congress by Congressman Louis Stokes (D) of Ohio and entered into the Congressional Record.

== Personal life ==
Giles grew up in Cleveland Ohio where segregation was a very common theme. However, Giles never let his circumstances stop him from achieving his goals.

== Naval career ==
Giles served 13 years serving with the U.S. Navy as a sonar technician, as well as a member of the Nuclear Reliability Weapons Team and Foreign Military Sales Team. Giles has also held top engineering positions working on the B2 Stealth Bomber, various submarine systems, and the Top Gun and Red Flag training systems.

== Racing career ==
=== 1990 Baja 1000 Offroad Desert Race ===
Giles became the first Black man to complete the Baja 1000.

After several years in the sport, Giles was seriously injured in an end-over-end crash where he received neck, spinal and heart injuries and has had a complete recovery.
