= Charlotte Waters, Northern Territory =

Charlotte Waters
- Location in Northern Territory
- Coordinates: 25°55′S 134°55′E
- Country: Australia
- Territory: Northern Territory
- LGA: MacDonnell Region
- Locality: Ghan
- Electoral division (territory): Namatjira
- Electoral division (federal): Lingiari

Population
  - Total: 0 (not listed)
- Postcode: 0872
- Abandoned c.1939 – only ruins still exist.

Charlotte Waters was a tiny settlement in the Northern Territory of Australia located close to the South Australian border, not far from Aputula. It was known for its telegraph station, the Charlotte Waters Telegraph Station, which became a hub for scientists travelling in central Australia in the late 19th and early 20th century. Aboriginal artist Erlikilyika, known to Europeans as Jim Kite, lived there. Only a ruin remains today.

== History ==
=== Traditional names ===
Norman Tindale, in his Cockatoo Creek expedition (1931) journal, recorded Alkngulura as the name of Charlotte Waters, and translated this as "Alknga – eye – ulura – ?hill", and Strehlow was told by Tom Bagot Injola in 1968 that the waterholes close to the telegraph station were known as Alkiljauwurera, Alkngolulura and Untupera. Jason Gibson, of Museum Victoria, noted that two other Lower Arrernte place names have been recorded for the area: Adnyultultera and Arleywernpe.

=== Settlement ===
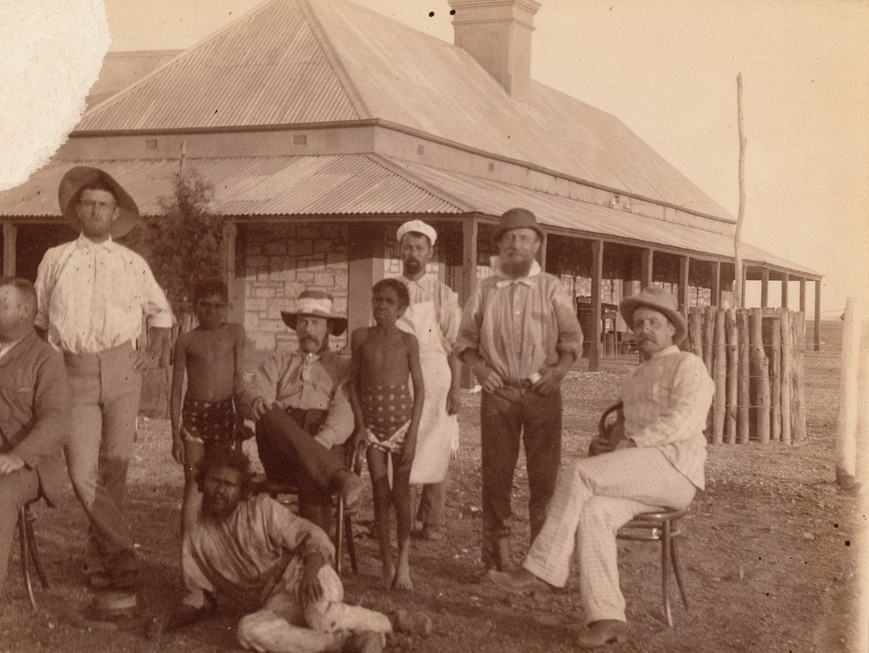
Telegraph Station, c.1880, Paddy Byrne on right (photograph by Henry Yorke Lyell Brown, government geologist).

Charlotte Waters was located in 1871 by surveyors Gilbert McMinn and Richard Knuckey during construction of the Australian Overland Telegraph Line between Adelaide and Darwin. According to explorer Ernest Giles, it was named after Lady Charlotte Bacon by Knuckey, after the surveyors had read Byron's long narrative poem Childe Harold's Pilgrimage (1812-1818), which had been dedicated to the young woman (then Lady Harley, aged 11) as Ianthe. Lady Bacon had stayed with relatives in South Australia between 1869 and 1874.

Christopher Giles (no relation of Ernest), a surveyor in Goyder's 1868 expedition and with Charles Todd in 1870, was involved with the surveying of the telegraph line with younger brother Alfred. In 1872, a telegraph repeater, post office and general store were built at Charlotte Waters, and Christopher Giles served at the repeater station until 1876. The station was nicknamed Bleak House by the telegraph operators, as the area was a desolate gibber plain, with no bushes or trees.

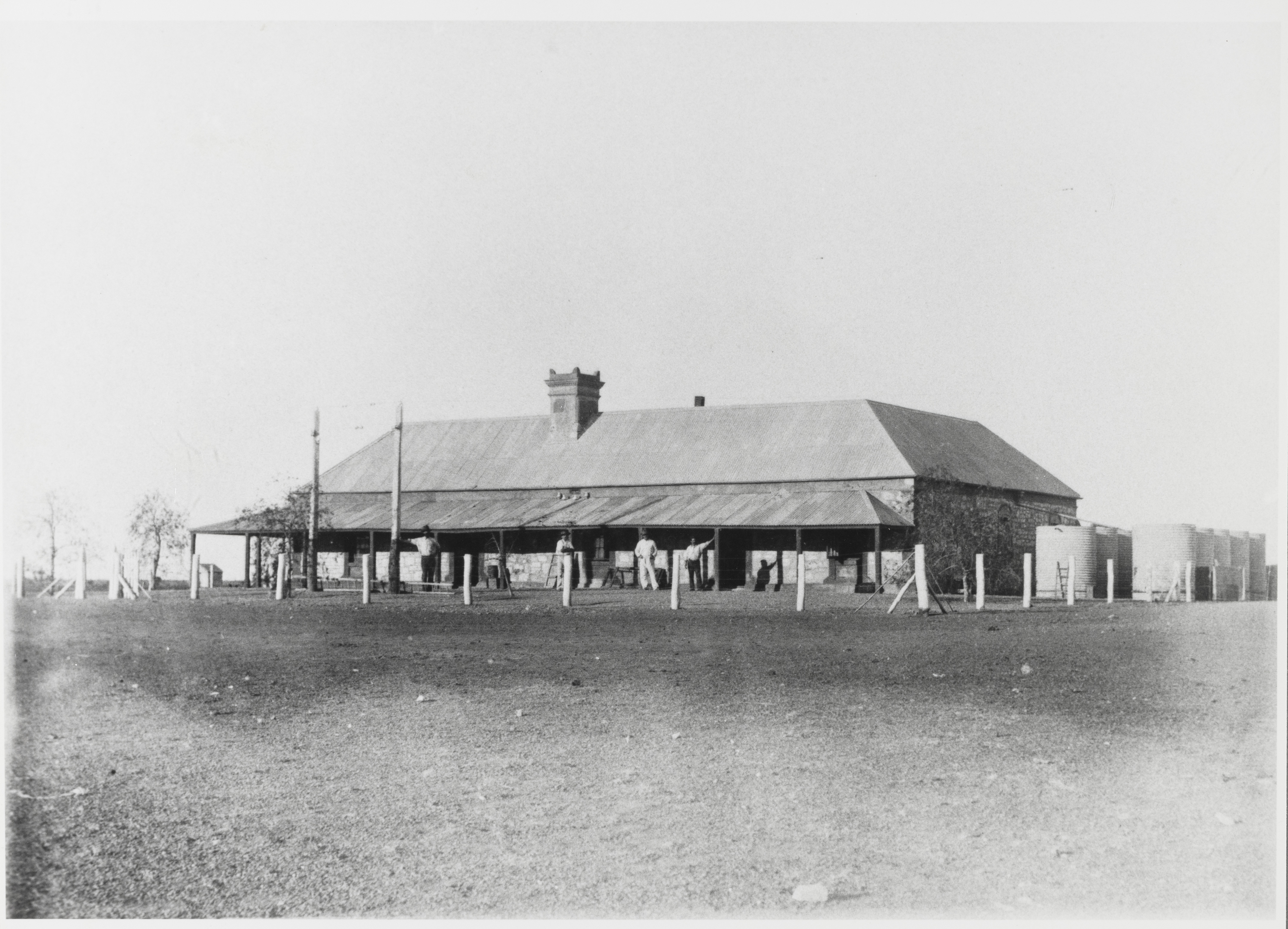
Charlotte Waters Telegraph Station, date unknown

Charlotte Waters became an important stopover for those travelling into the interior, and also an important hub for a number of collectors, scientists and anthropologists, including Baldwin Spencer and Francis (Frank) Gillen. Gillen was stationed there from 1875 to 1892. Camel trains driven by "Afghan" cameleers often accompanied the expeditions or passed through Charlotte Waters.

Patrick Byrne worked at the telegraph station for 50 years, after commencing as a teenager (c.1873). Also known as Paddy or Pado, Byrne corresponded with Spencer and collected specimens for biological analysis for many years. Spencer named a small marsupial known locally as the kowari in recognition of Byrne's contribution as Dasyuroides byrnei, and Byrne's work continues to contribute to scientists' understanding of central Australian mammals. He was also reportedly a blacksmith, and buried his dog at the back of the building in a small grave surrounded by ironwork railings, which still exists. Byrne is mentioned in Erlikilyika's biographical entry in the Australian Dictionary of Biography as appreciating his skills and talent. He was step-brother to Amelia Gillen, wife of Frank. Byrne has been identified as the man on the right in the photograph above.

After Byrne's departure in 1909, telegraphist Harry O. Kearnan became the telegraph stationmaster.

Erlikilyika (c.1865–c.1930), Arrernte sculptor, artist and anthropological interpreter, known to Europeans as Jim Kite and probably the first Aboriginal Australian artist to become known nationally, was born nearby and lived at Charlotte Waters for most of his life. Kearnan accompanied Erlikilyika to Adelaide in 1913, where some of his artistic works were exhibited at the Selborne Hotel in Pirie Street.

=== End of the telegraph era ===
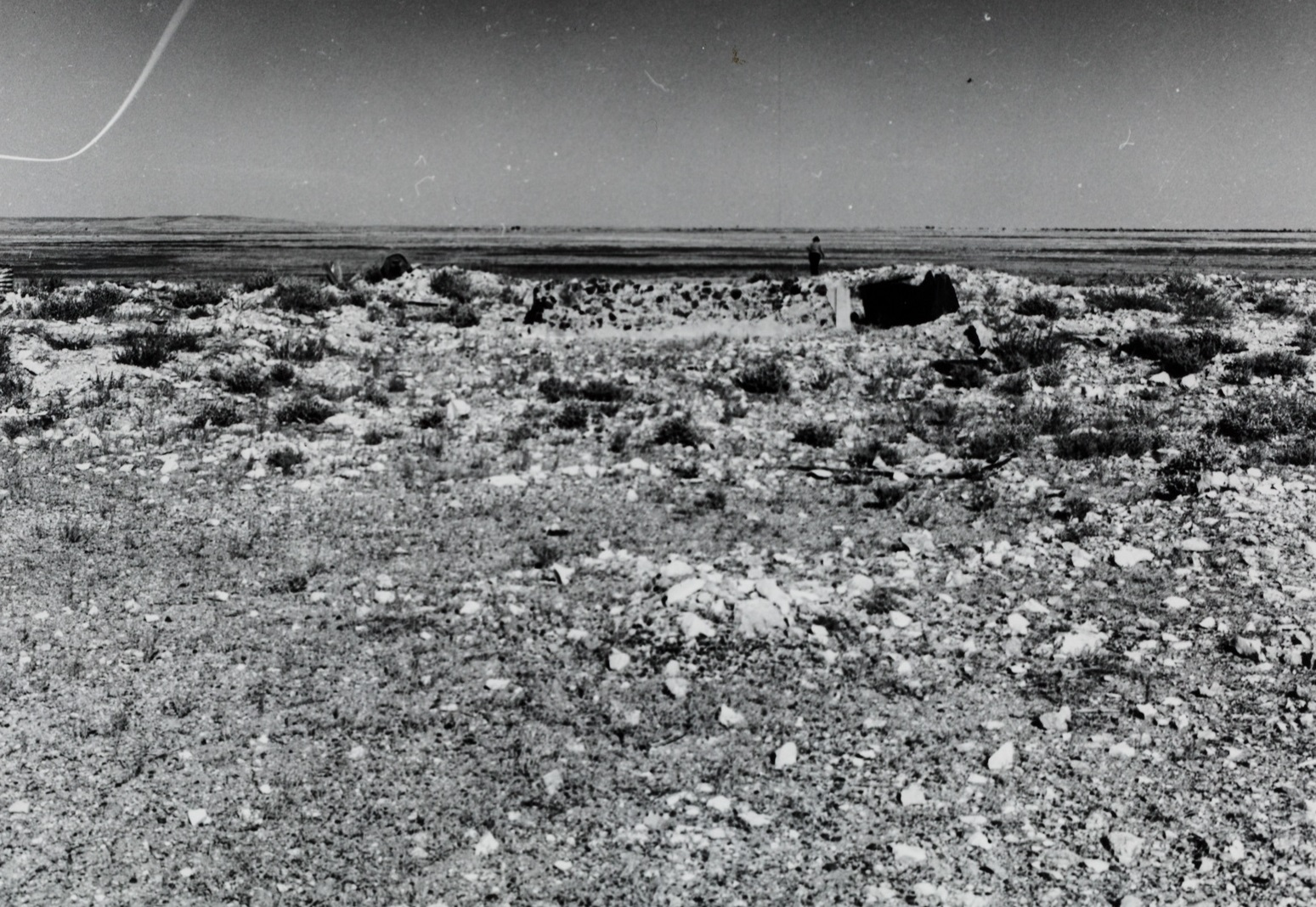
1982 photograph of ruins

As technology improved, the telegraph station at Charlotte Waters was by-passed. The building was then used as a police station, and vital equipment and postal services were maintained by the policeman and his wife. In February 1936, Constable Jack Kennett and his wife Isabel and their five children were living at the lonely Charlotte Waters Police Station when several of the children contracted diphtheria. After a series of misfortunes befell them and those trying to assist, two children died. A year later, Kennett was transferred to Alice Springs, where the memory of the family was honoured by the naming of a street called Kennett Court.

In July 1938, T.G.H. (Ted) Strehlow and his wife Bertha visited Charlotte Waters. Bertha thought it the most isolated and desolate place she had ever encountered. At that time, the homestead also still served as the police station, but it had been abandoned by the following year.

Only the ruins of the foundation remained by the late 20th century, after the station building had been dismantled in order to re-use the stone in constructing the buildings on a nearby cattle station.

== Plants and animals ==
The following plants and animals are linked to Charlotte Waters and indigenous to the area:
Plants:

- Christopher Giles is commemorated by the species name of dolomite fuchsia bush, Eremophila christopheri, whose habitat includes Charlotte Waters.
- The genus Gilesia is named for both Christopher and Ernest Giles.
- Cyperus gilesii and Panicum gilesii are usually listed as honouring Ernest Giles, but the type details for both species are given by George Bentham only as "Central Australia. Charlotte Waters, Giles".
- The desert fuchsia, Eremophila gilesii, which honours Ernest, is widespread across the region.

Animals:

- Spencer named the kowari, in recognition of Byrne's contribution, as Dasyuroides byrnei (see above).
