= Karlu Karlu / Devils Marbles Conservation Reserve =

Protected area in the Northern Territory, Australia

- IUCN category V (protected landscape/seascape)
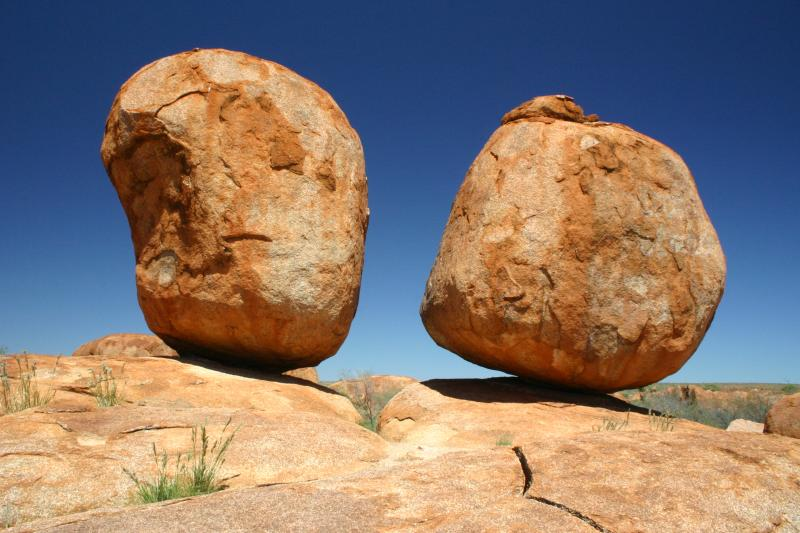
- A pair of balanced boulders at the site

- Location within Northern Territory
- Location: Northern Territory, Warumungu
- Nearest city: Wauchope
- Coordinates: 20°33′S 134°17′E
- Area: 18.02 km^{2} (6.96 sq mi)
- Established: October 1961
- Visitors: 137,500 (in 2012)
- Governing body: Traditional Aboriginal Owners and the Parks and Wildlife Commission of the Northern Territory
- Website: Official website

Karlu Karlu / Devils Marbles Conservation Reserve is a protected area in the Northern Territory of Australia located in the locality of Warumungu about 105 km (65 mi) south of Tennant Creek, and 393 km (244 mi) north of Alice Springs. The nearest settlement is the small town of Wauchope located 9 km (5.6 mi) to the south. The hamlet of Wycliffe Well is located 25 km (16 mi) to the south.

The Devils Marbles are of great cultural and spiritual significance to the Aboriginal traditional owners of the land, and the reserve protects one of the oldest religious sites in the world as well as the natural rock formations found there. Karlu Karlu is the local Aboriginal term for both the rock features and the surrounding area. The Aboriginal term translates as "round boulders" and refers to the large boulders found mainly in the western side of the reserve. The English name for the boulders derives from a quote by John Ross during the 1870 Australian Overland Telegraph Line expedition, where he said "This is the Devil’s country; he’s even emptied his bag of marbles around the place!"

The area was originally named Devils Marbles Reserve in October 1961. The name was changed to Devil's Marbles Conservation Reserve on 21 September 1979 under the Territory Parks and Wildlife Conservation Act. In 1980, the conservation reserve was listed on the now-defunct Register of the National Estate. In 1982, almost the entire reserve was registered as a sacred site by the Aboriginal Areas Protection Authority.

Ownership of Karlu Karlu/Devils Marbles was officially passed from the Parks and Wildlife Service of the Northern Territory back to the traditional owners at a ceremony held on the reserve in October 2008. The reserve is now leased back to the Parks Service under a 99-year lease and the site is jointly managed by rangers and traditional owners. Visitor access has not been affected, making it an Indigenous Protected Area. On 6 July 2011, the name Karlu Karlu / Devils Marbles Conservation Reserve was assigned, corresponding with the joint management structure.

== Features ==
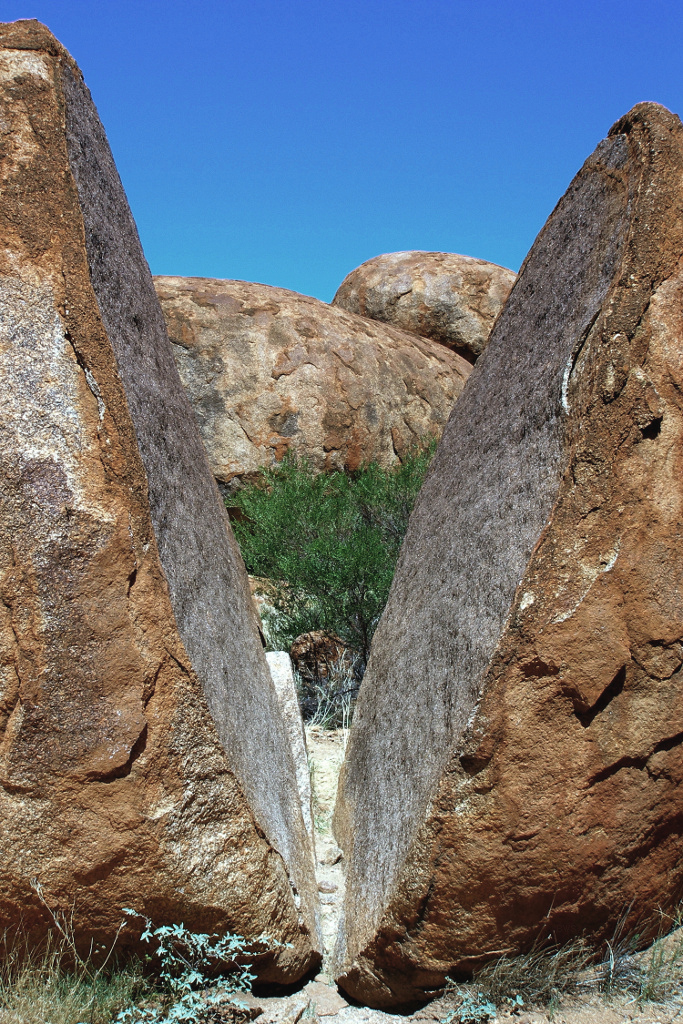
A naturally split boulder

The Devils Marbles are large granitic boulders that form the exposed top layer of an extensive and mostly underground granite formation. The natural processes of weathering and erosion have created the various shapes of the boulders. Some of the boulders are naturally but precariously balanced atop one another or on larger rock formations, while others have been split cleanly down the middle by natural forces. The boulders are situated in a wide and shallow desert valley, and are found in scattered groups mainly in the western side of the reserve. A short access road leads directly into the boulder fields from the Stuart Highway.

Being one of the most widely recognised symbols of Australia’s outback, the Devils Marbles are also one of the most visited reserves/places in the Northern Territory. The Parks and Wildlife Service recorded 96,172 visitors in 2007. The visitation count increased to 137,500 by 2012. The peak season is in the cooler months from May to August. The reserve is one of the main tourist attractions in the Barkly region since it is easily seen and accessed just off the Stuart Highway, the major north/south road connecting Darwin and Alice Springs, and points further south.

The Devils Marbles are accessible all year round with a network of pathways, information boards and a basic camping area. Rangers offer a program of live events at the site as part of their Territory Parks Alive program between May and September each year.

== Aboriginal significance ==
Karlu Karlu are culturally and spiritually significant objects of the local Aboriginal people. Most of the conservation reserve is a Registered Sacred Site, protected under the Northern Territory Aboriginal Sacred Sites Act 1989. Although Karlu Karlu is within country originally belonging to the Alyawarre people, all of the other local Aboriginal groups, which include the Kaytetye, Warumungu and Warlpiri people, also have spiritual connections and responsibilities for the area.

Accounts of local Aboriginal people believing the boulders to be eggs of the mythical Rainbow Serpent are incorrect. In reality, a number of traditional Dreaming stories (none of which are about serpents) have Karlu Karlu as their setting, hence its great importance as a sacred site. These stories are alive and well and are passed on from generation to generation of traditional owners. Only a handful of stories are considered suitable to tell to uninitiated visitors.

One of the main Dreaming stories for the area which can be told to the public relates to how Karlu Karlu was created. This tradition tells of Arrange, the Devil Man, who came from a hill nearby and travelled through the area. Whilst walking along, Arrange made a hair-string belt which is a kind of traditional adornment worn only by initiated men. As he was twirling the hair to make strings, he dropped clusters of hair on the ground.

The clusters turned into the now famous big red boulders at Karlu Karlu. On his way back to his hill, Arrange spat on the ground. His spit turned into the granite boulders in the central part of the reserve. Arrange finally returned to his place of origin, a hill called Ayleparrarntenhe where he remains today.

== Formation ==
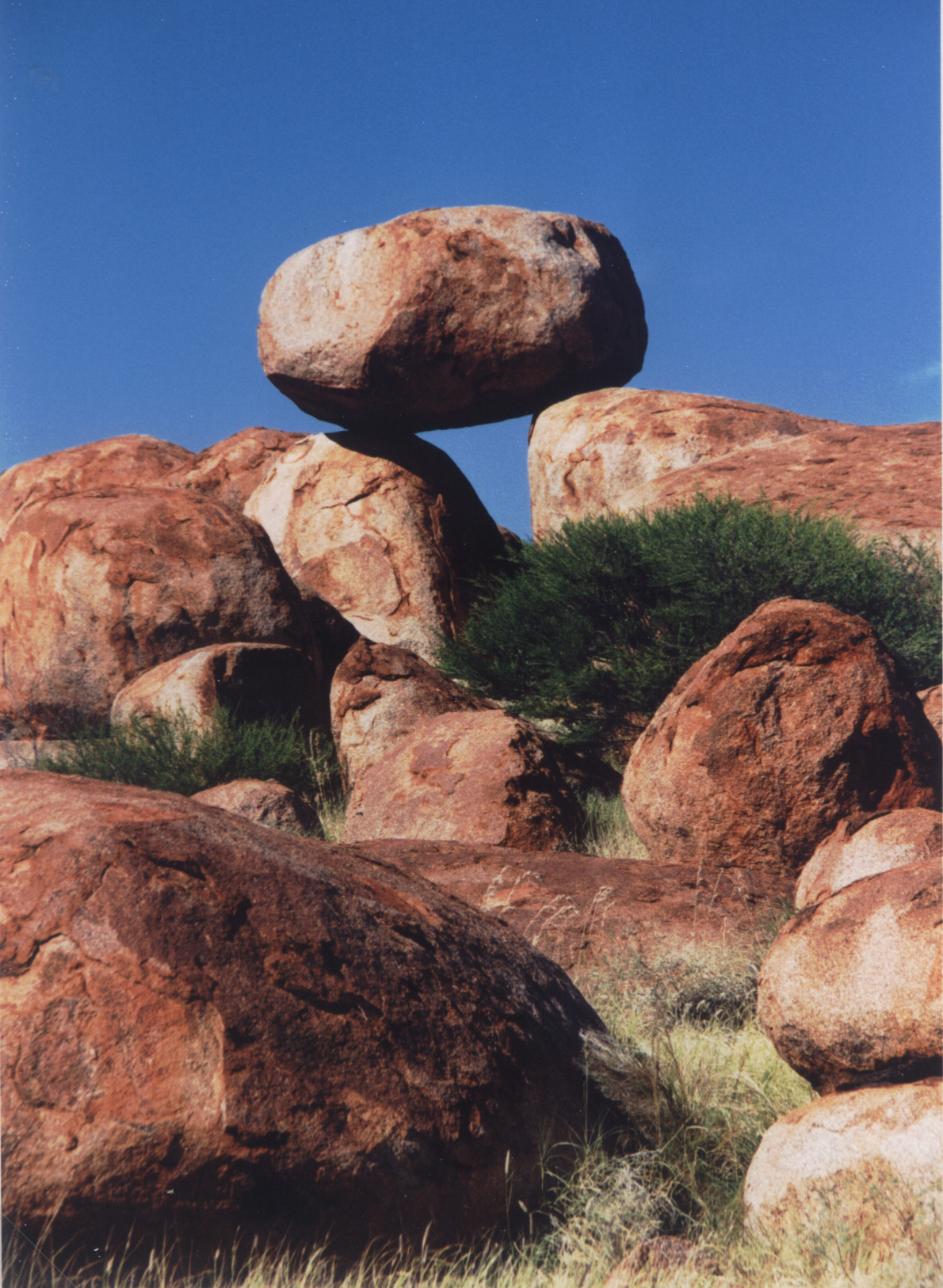
Suspended boulder

The Devils Marbles constitute a degraded nubbin. The formation is made of granite and part of the top layer of a formation which penetrates the ground from below, like little geological islands in the desert, surrounded by large amounts of sandstone. The granite was formed millions of years ago as a result of the hardening of magma within the Earth's crust. Thick layers of sandstone on top of the granite exerted extreme downward pressure on the granite. After some time, tectonic forces caused folding of the Earth's crust in the area, which lifted the granite and fractured the sandstone, allowing the granite to come closer to the surface. As the pressure diminished, the granite expanded causing cracks to form, and then the larger formations began to separate into big, square blocks.

The next phase of the formation of the Marbles started when the blocks were exposed to water. The surface of the blocks began to decay under the influence of the water and a layer of loose material surrounded the individual blocks. When the blocks came to the surface completely, the loose material was eroded away by water and wind.

The rounding of the granite blocks is a result of chemical and physical (also called mechanical) weathering. Chemical processes cause the surface of the blocks to expand and contract, resulting in thin layers of rock coming off the boulder in a process called exfoliation. This process rounds the granite block because the chemical processes have more effect on areas with edges. The rock begins to look like it is made of layers like an onion. Only the outer few centimetres are affected by chemical weathering in a process called spheroidal weathering.

The boulders are affected more deeply by the extreme temperature differences between day and night in the arid desert region where the reserve is located. During daylight hours the rocks expand slightly and after nightfall they contract slightly, repeating the process every 24 hours. These repeated cycles of expansion and contraction, called thermal stress weathering, create cracks which sometimes go so deep that the boulder is completely split in half.

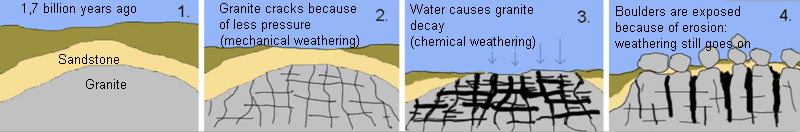

== Controversy ==
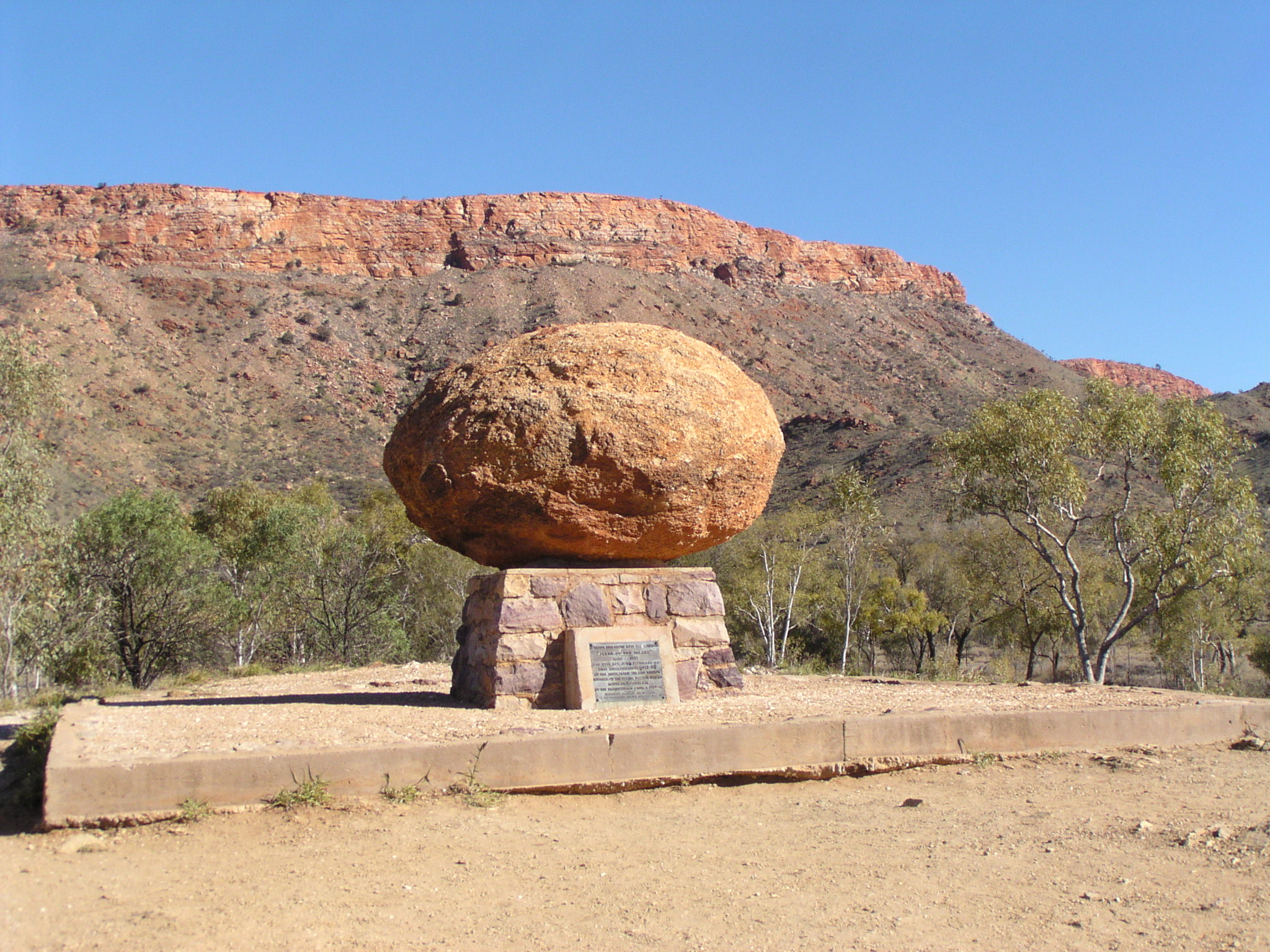
John Flynn's Memorial with the replacement boulder, Alice Springs, 2002

One of the boulders was removed from the reserve in 1952 and taken to Alice Springs to form a memorial to John Flynn, the founder of the Royal Flying Doctor Service. The boulder was chosen as a symbol of his link to the outback, but it became the source of a lengthy controversy. The boulder had unwittingly been removed from a sacred site of the Aboriginal women of the area. Eventually, after more than 45 years of negotiations, a boulder swap was arranged and the sacred boulder was removed from the grave and returned to its original place on 4 September 1999. The grave is now marked with a similar but non-sacred boulder donated by the Arrernte people.

For more information see: John Flynn's Grave Historical Reserve (Alice Springs).

== Historic images ==
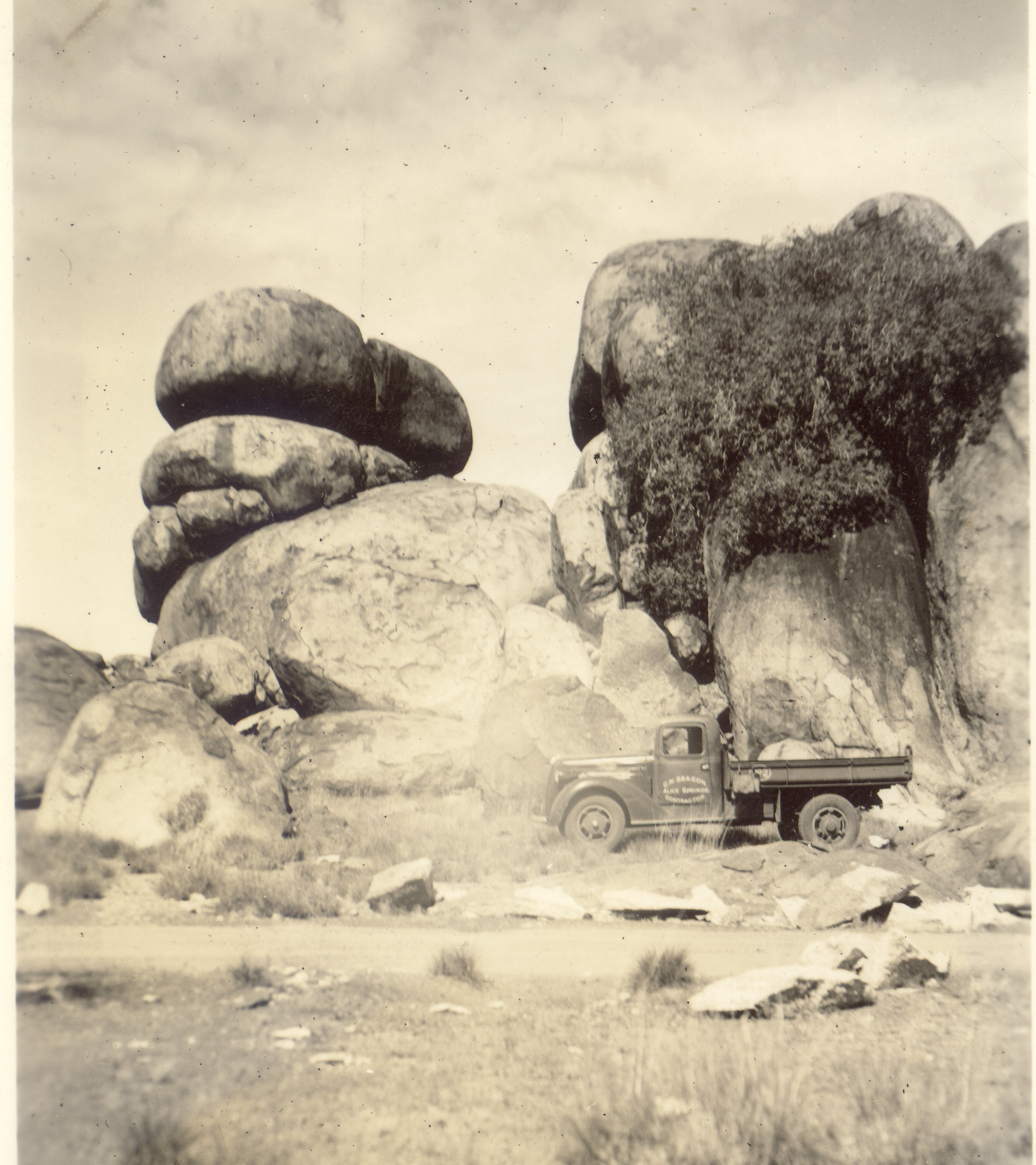
Karlu Karlu between 1938 and 1948

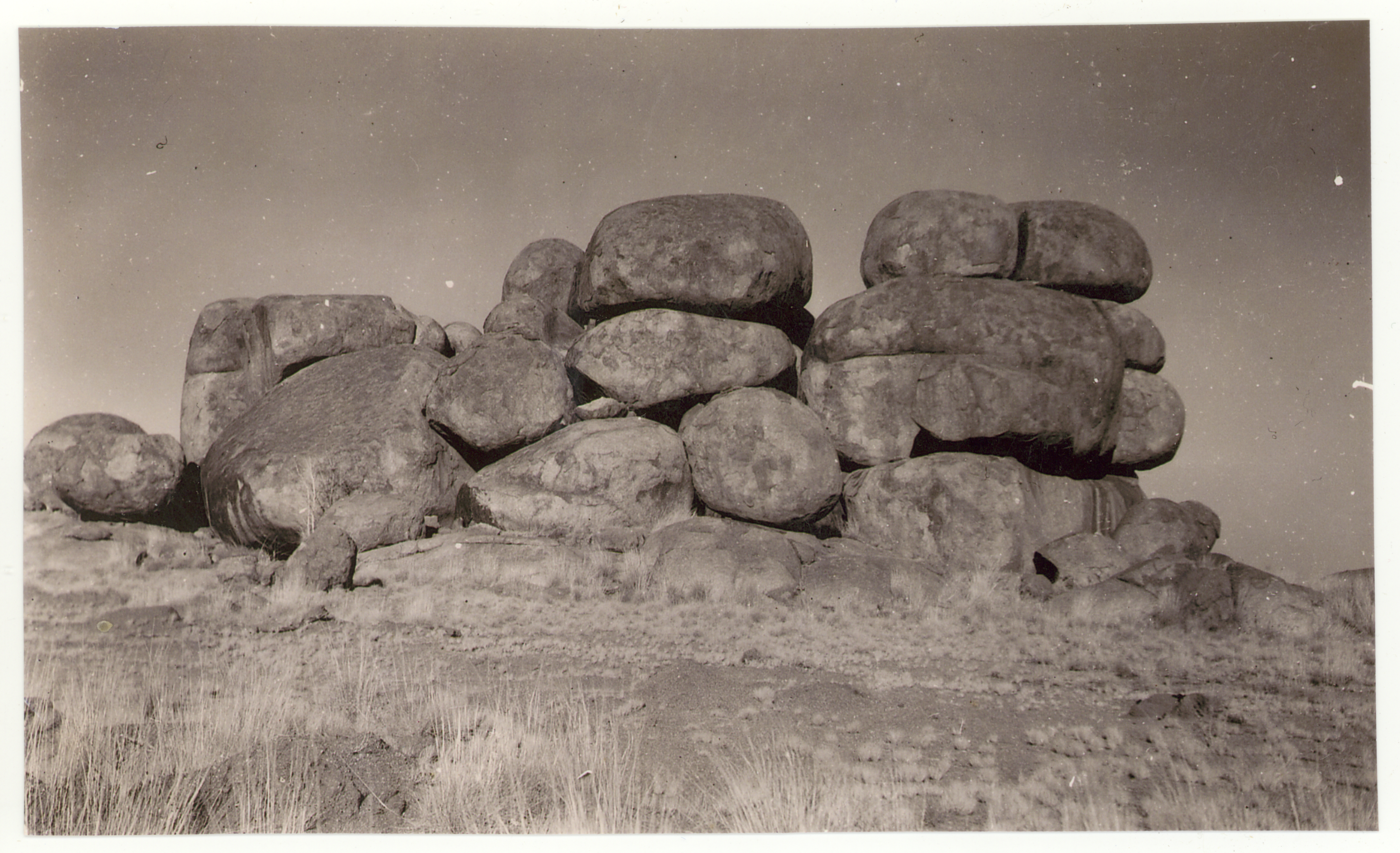
Karlu Karlu in 1946

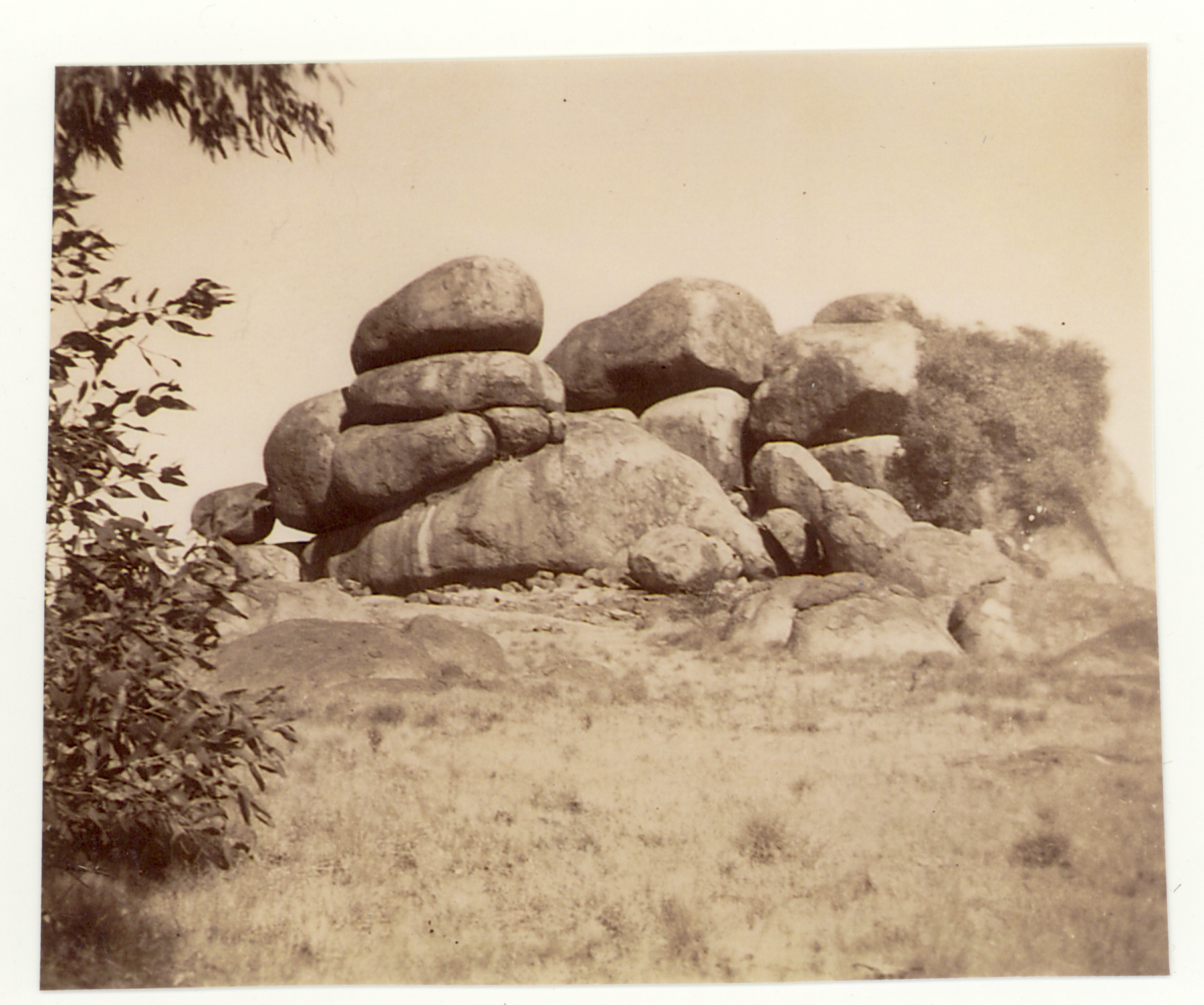
Karlu Karlu in 1946

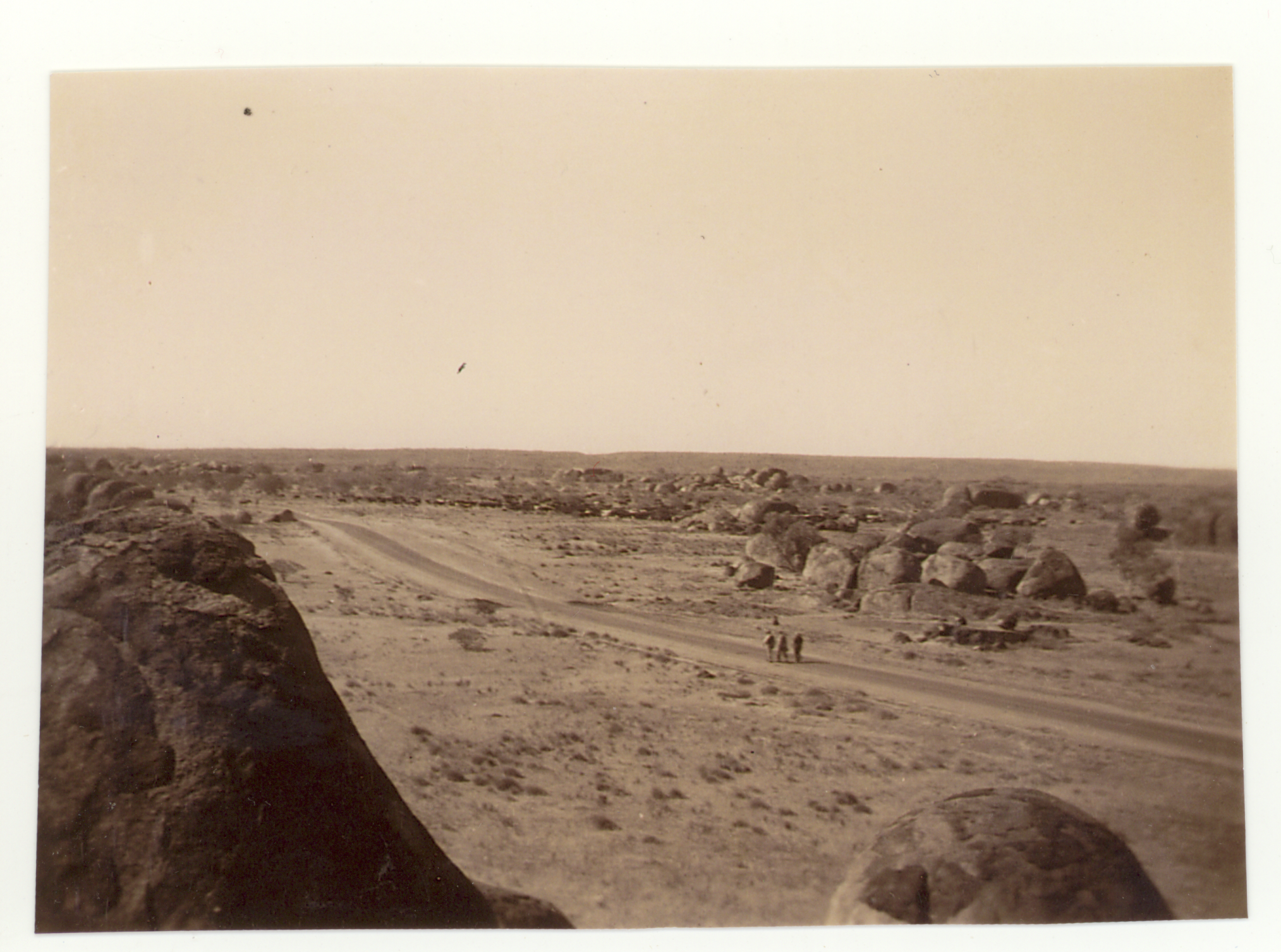
Karlu Karlu in 1946

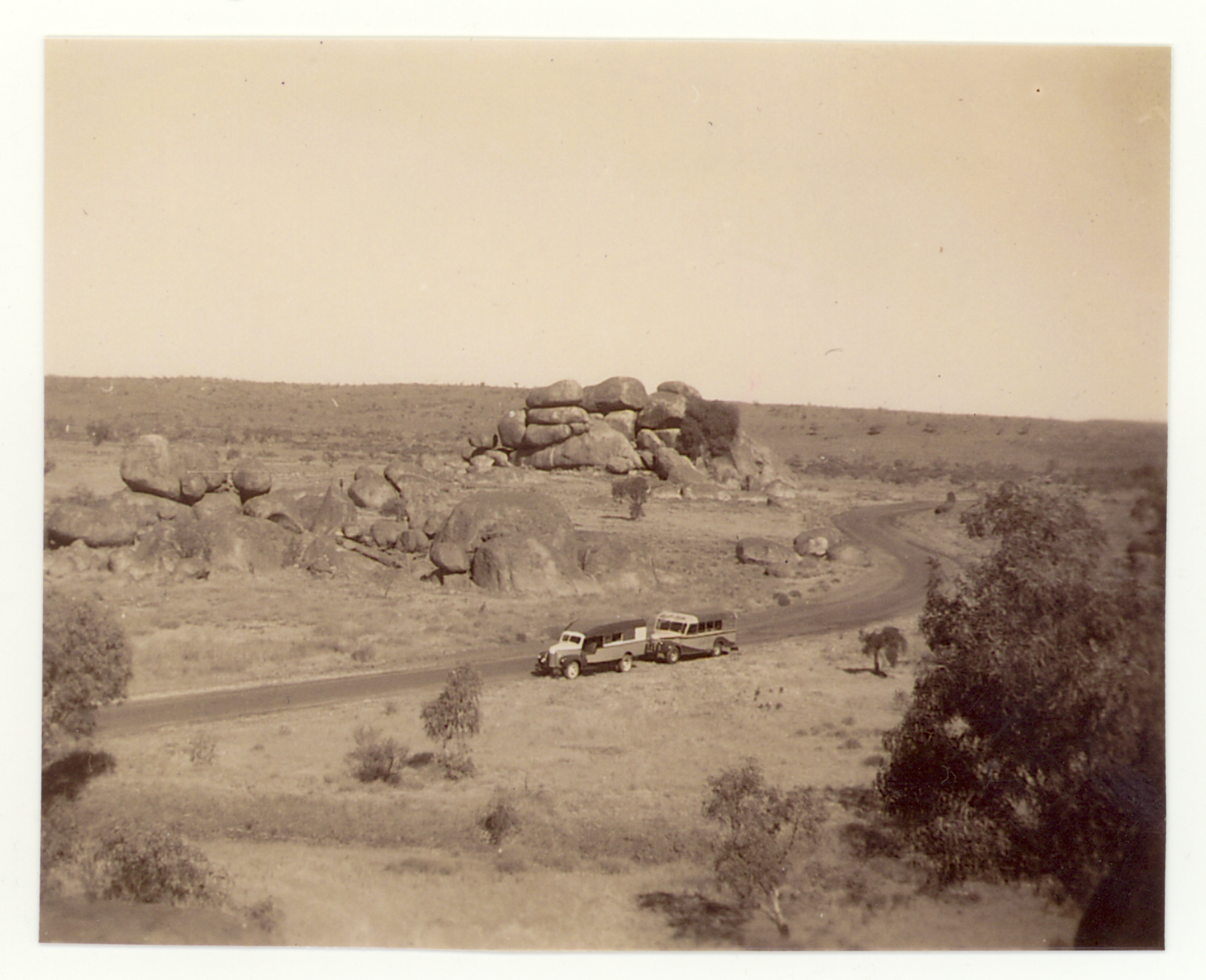
Karlu Karlu in 1946

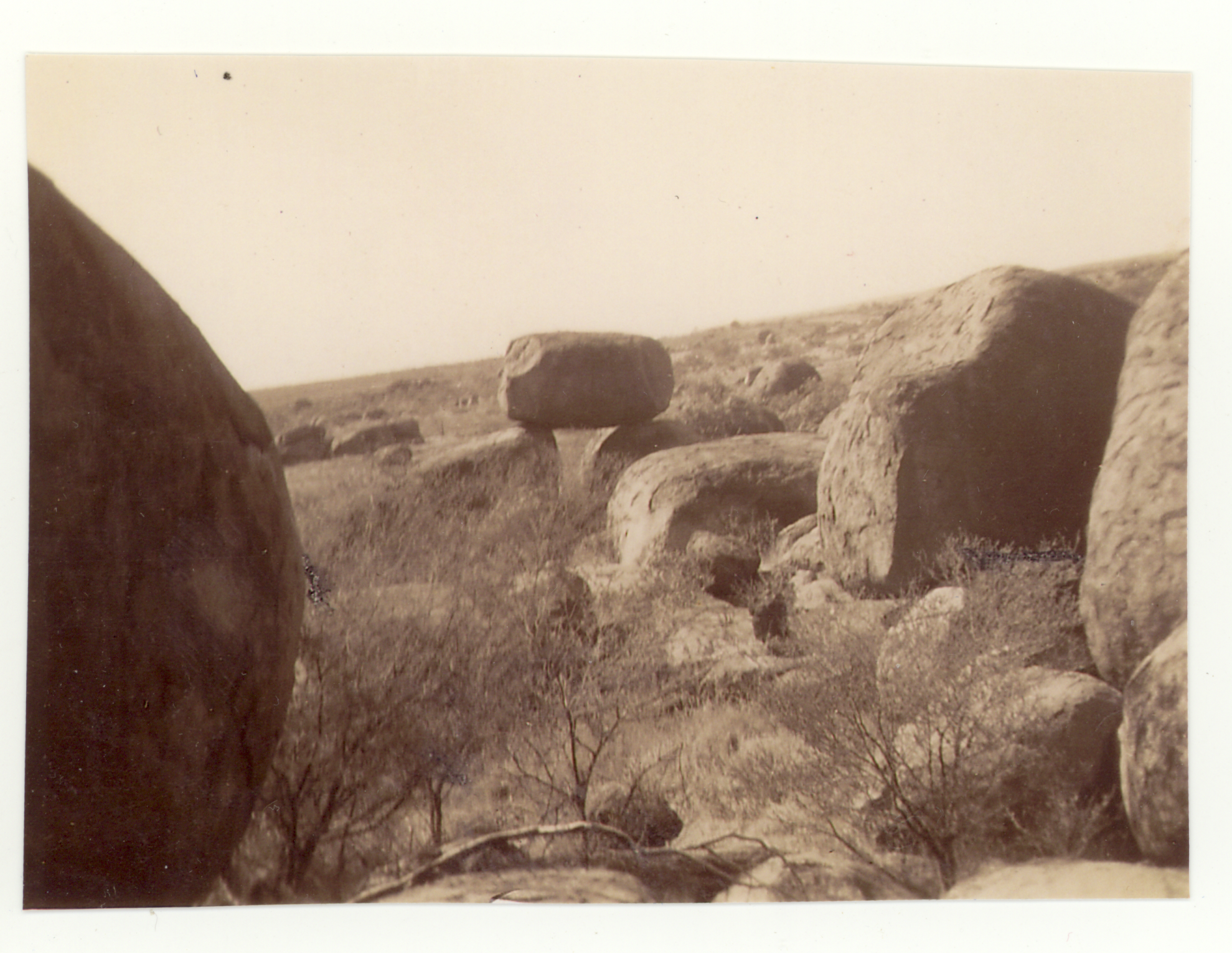
Karlu Karlu in 1946

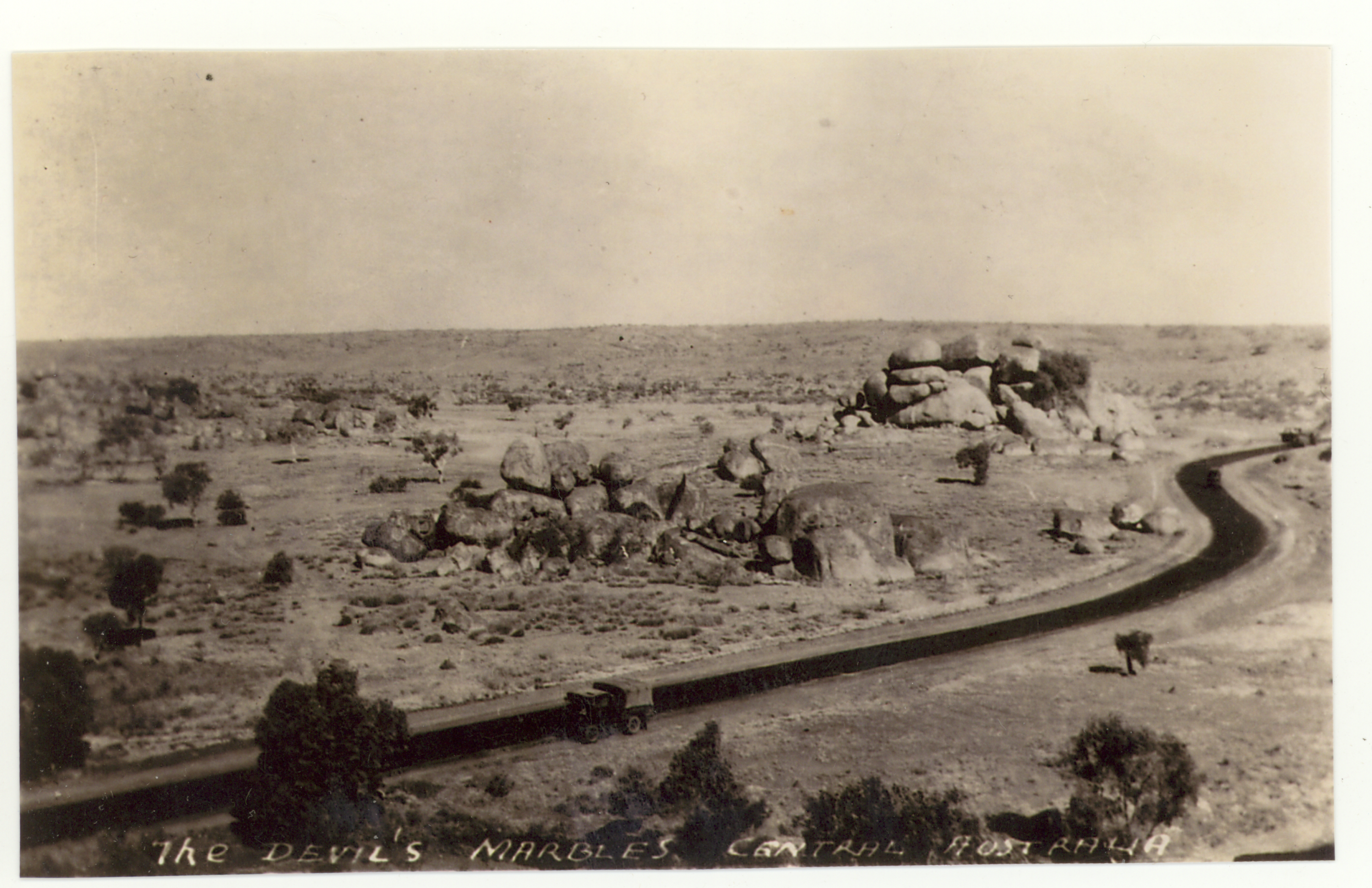
The Stuart Highway running nearby to Karlu Karlu in 1946

Karlu Karlu in 1946

== See also ==
- Chambers Pillar
- Ewaninga Rock Carvings Conservation Reserve
- Henbury Meteorites Conservation Reserve
- Rainbow Valley Conservation Reserve
- Uluṟu-Kata Tjuṯa National Park
- Watarrka National Park
- West MacDonnell National Park
