= Panaramitee Style =

Panaramitee Style, also known as track and circle or Classic Panaramitee, is a particular type of pecked engravings found in Australian rock art, created by Aboriginal peoples of the continent. The style, named after Panaramitee sheep station, located in the Flinders Ranges of South Australia, where they were first identified, depicts a variety of animal tracks, including those of macropods, birds and humans, as well as radiating designs, circles, spots, crescents and spirals.

== Style identification and characteristics ==
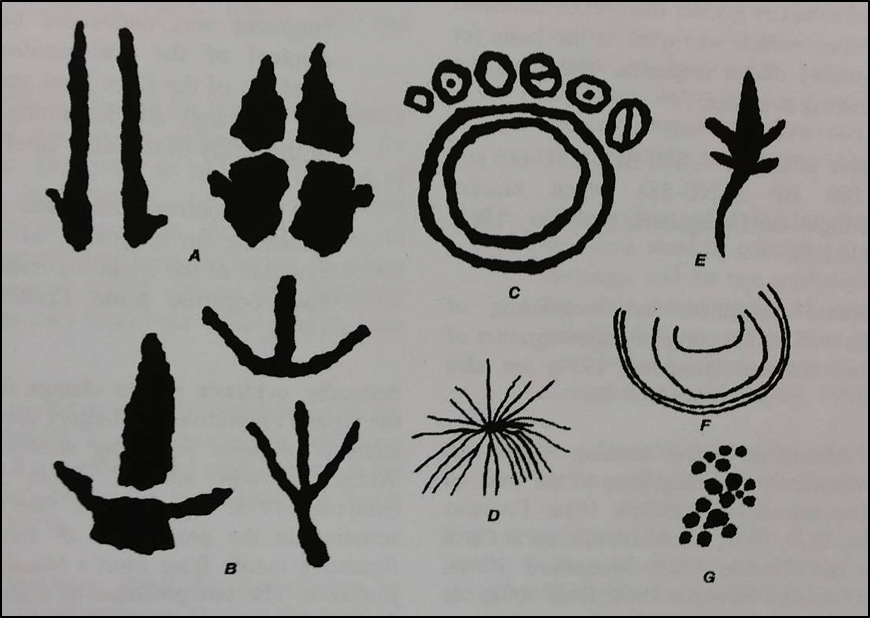
Figure 1 showing typical motifs found at Panaramitee sites a. macropod tracks b. bird tracks c. circles d. radiating lines e. lizards f. crescents g. dots

The style of petroglyph in discussion was originally identified at a number of sites located on Panaramitee sheep station as seen in figure 2. The first person to publish about the petroglyphs was Herbert Basedow, having examined several sites from the Panaramitee region. In this publication he also made the first qualified claims for the Pleistocene antiquity of rock art outside of Europe.

In 1976 Lesley Maynard published a paper called An archaeological approach to the study of Australian rock art which divided Australian rock art into three main styles: Panaramitee; simple figurative; and complex figurative. These styles were then considered to be chronological, morphing into more advanced styles as time progressed eventually evolving into more sophisticated art. This point of view is no longer widely accepted by the archaeological community.

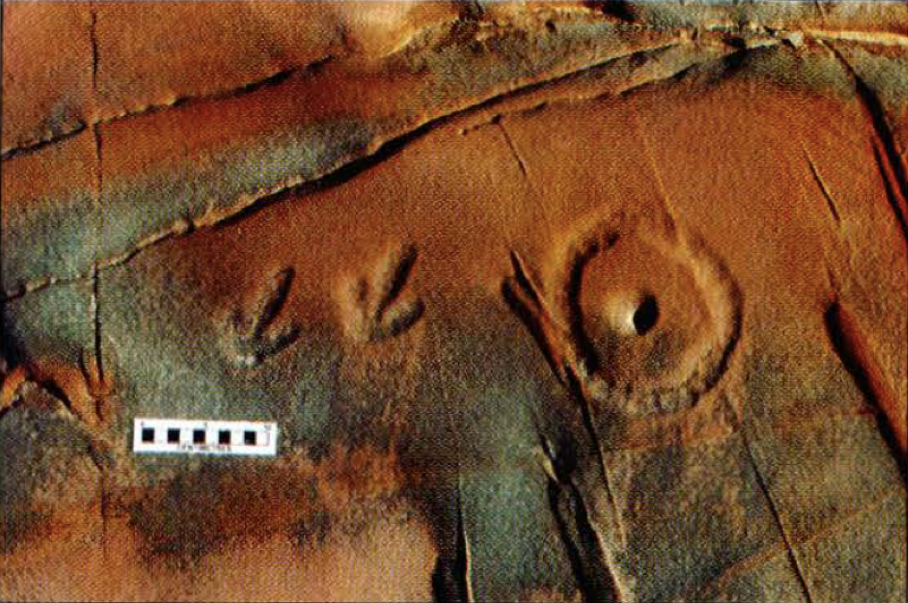
Figure 4: Engravings at Middle Arm Peninsula, NT

Panaramitee Style rock art is produced by pecking on rock surfaces through indirect percussion, typically with a pointed hammer stone. There are some instances, however where tracks, circular designs and cupules have been produced by using a large blunt hammer as seen at two sites located in the Middle Arm Peninsula, 16 km (9.9 mi) south-east of Darwin, Northern Territory (see figure 4). It has been estimated that 60% of the style consists of animal tracks, 20% of circles, 10% lines and the other 10% miscellaneous motifs such as the lizard in picture 1.

== Meanings ==
Circles in Australian Aboriginal art are often interpreted as being representative of water sources, while radiating lines indicate the path of an ancestral being.

A common interpretation is that motifs such as Panaramitee ones provide shared knowledge to travellers moving through the landscape; plotting important routes to resources. Meanings may nonetheless change over time, with the potential of multiple meanings to different groups of people at different times.

== Site locations ==
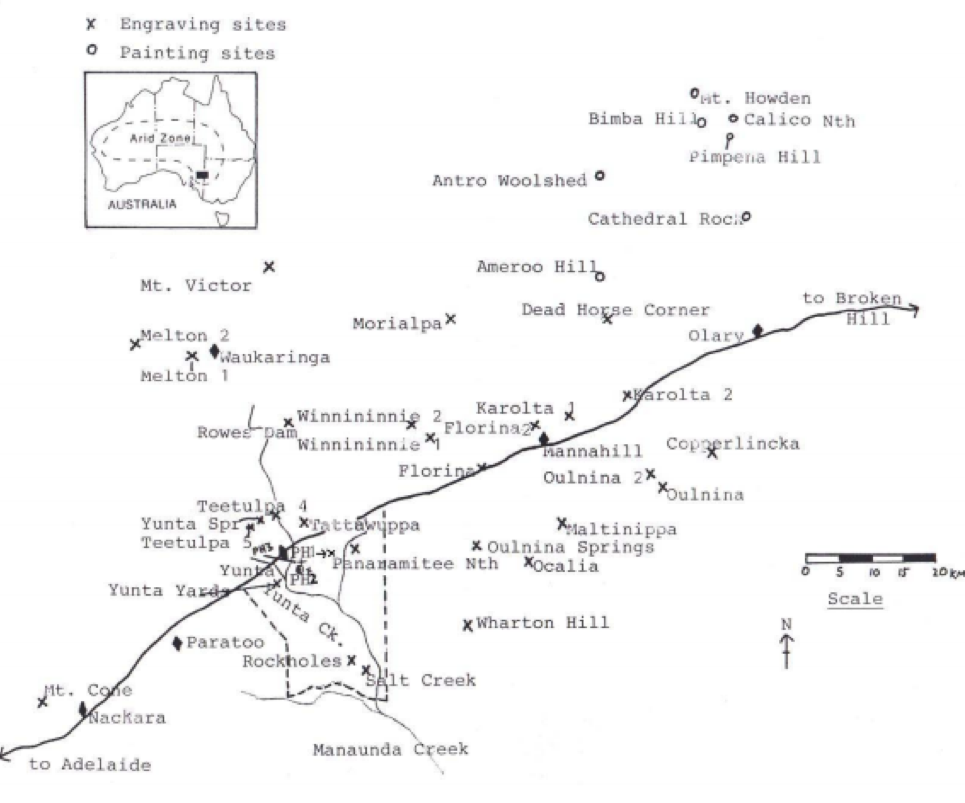
Figure 2: Map of Panaramitee sheep station, SA, with petroglyphs typifying the style marked by crosses

Apart from Panaramitee sheep station and Middle Arm, Panaramitee Style engravings have been found in several other locations across Australia.

Panaramitee engravings exist at Wild Dog Creek, within the Woomera weapons range in South Australia. Carved by Kokatha people long ago, the shapes include kangaroo footprints, human footprints, and representations of shelter, which impart much information about the area.

Not restricted to South Australia, these engravings have been found in central Australia, New South Wales, the Northern Territory (NT), Queensland and Western Australia. Figure 3 shows a map of Australia with black dots indicating recorded Panaramitee-style sites.

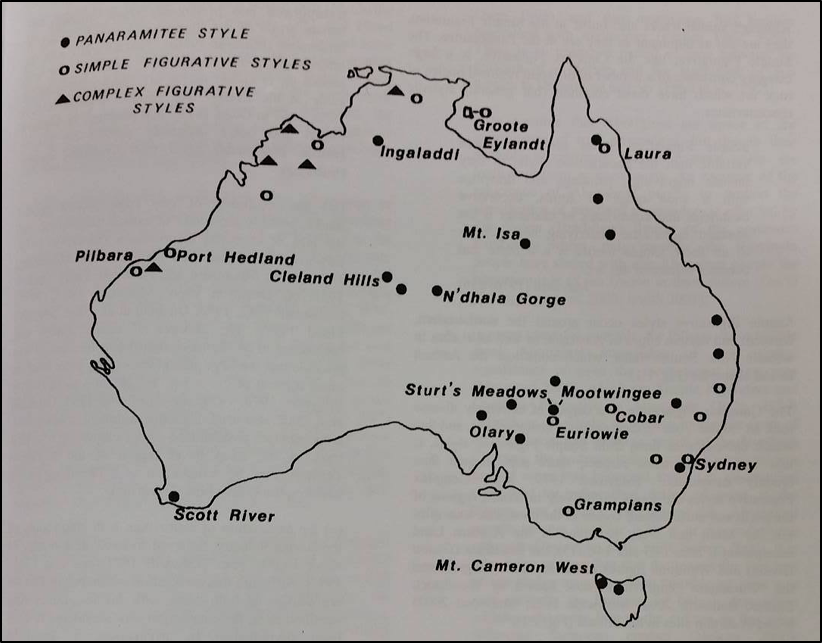
Figure 3: Map of Australia showing Panaramitee Style rock art site locations

Among these sites include Puritjarra rock shelter, N'Dhala Gorge, Ewaninga and Ooraminna in central Australia (NT), Ingladdi (NT), Early Man cave in the Laura region of Queensland and possibly the Nappapethera Waterhole in the southwest of the state, Sturt's Meadows in NSW and Scott River in WA.

There have been some claims for Panaramitee style being present in Tasmania (locations marked on figure 3) however there has been a great deal of speculation being dated to the last 2,000 years which is inconsistent with Tasmania being sundered from the mainland.

== Dating and ongoing practice ==
The Panaramitee Style has been argued to be over 7,000 years old based on archaeological dating techniques, anthropological research, the recent occurrence of geographic barriers and animal tracks which possibly portray extinct megafauna. Rock art is notoriously difficult to accurately date with very few examples of stratigraphic association which are conclusively related to the artwork (Mulvaney and Kamminga 1999:367). However, it has been long assumed that the Panaramitee Style is very old based on Basedow's aforementioned early publication.

Basedow justified a Pleistocene age by using four main arguments:

1. Petroglyphs located at two sites are inaccessible because of vertical erosion
2. Detached painted rock on the valley floor, the other part of the design situated high on the rock face
3. Dark patina covering the petroglyphs
4. Speculated megafauna tracks, said to reflect extinct diprotodon prints

This was furthered by later claims from Norman Tindale, suggesting genyornis and procoptodon tracks near Yunta Springs, and reports from Charles P. Mountford that a saltwater crocodile was depicted at Panaramitee station. Since the extinction of most megafauna transpired at least 20,000 years ago and the extinction of saltwater crocodiles in this region millions of years ago, these speculations would suggest a very late antiquity.

Modern dating techniques have not supported these claims, with the general consensus being that the style emerged during the first half of the Holocene epoch. Environmental changes allowed for the expansion of populations from refugia into more arid, central regions, subsequently spreading technological and social features including art.

The oldest conclusive date for Panaramitee Style rock art belongs to Early Man cave with a minimum date range of 13,000 to 14,000 years before present. The art in the Laura region, although fitting within the Panaramitee Style, has been recognised as different to "Classic Panaramitee" styles, with differing proportions of motifs, perhaps originating in the Laura region but changing geographically.

It is known that the practice of Panaramitee Style rock art is still practised in modernity through a number of ethnographic examples. From at least 13,000 years ago Australian Aboriginal people were producing the Panaramitee Style petroglyphs, and have continued that tradition to this day.
