= N'Dhala Gorge Nature Park =

Protected area in Northern Territory, Australia

- IUCN category V (protected landscape/seascape)
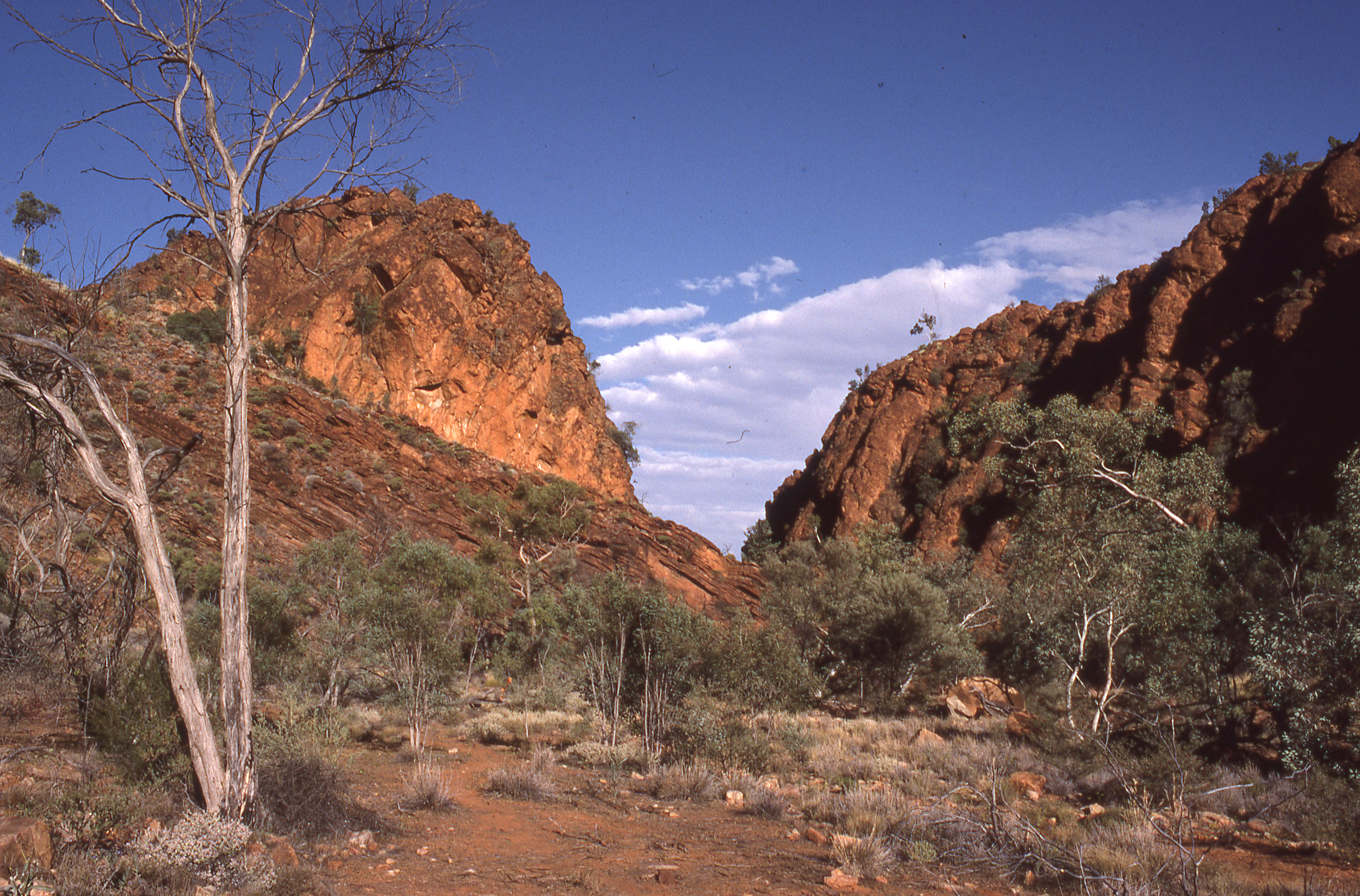
- N'Dhala Gorge

- Location within Northern Territory
- Location: Northern Territory, Hale
- Nearest city: Alice Springs
- Coordinates: 23°38′08″S 134°27′15″E
- Area: 5.01 km^{2} (1.93 sq mi)
- Established: 21 December 1962
- Governing body: Parks and Wildlife Commission of the Northern Territory; Traditional owners
- Website: Official website

N'Dhala Gorge Nature Park is a protected area in the Northern Territory of Australia consisting of an area of low sand dunes, rocky outcrops, about 90 kilometres (56 mi) east of Alice Springs. It is significant principally because of thousands of Indigenous rock carvings.

== Description ==
N'Dhala Gorge Nature Park is located in the eastern MacDonnell Ranges. It contains approximately 6,000 stone carvings, or petroglyphs, as well as a wide variety of rare Australian plant life.

The gorge was used by the Eastern Arrernte people, who called the area Ilwentje. It contains men's sacred sites, petroglyphs, shelter or occupation sites and art sites. The 6,000 stone carvings are believed to have been created in two separate periods, the first approximately ten thousand years ago, and the second approximately three thousand years ago. They could be created by using two different techniques: either by pounding a rocky surface with another rock, or by a fine pecking technique.

Significant plant life in the area includes the undoolya wattle and the peach-leafed poison bush.

== Gallery of rock carvings ==
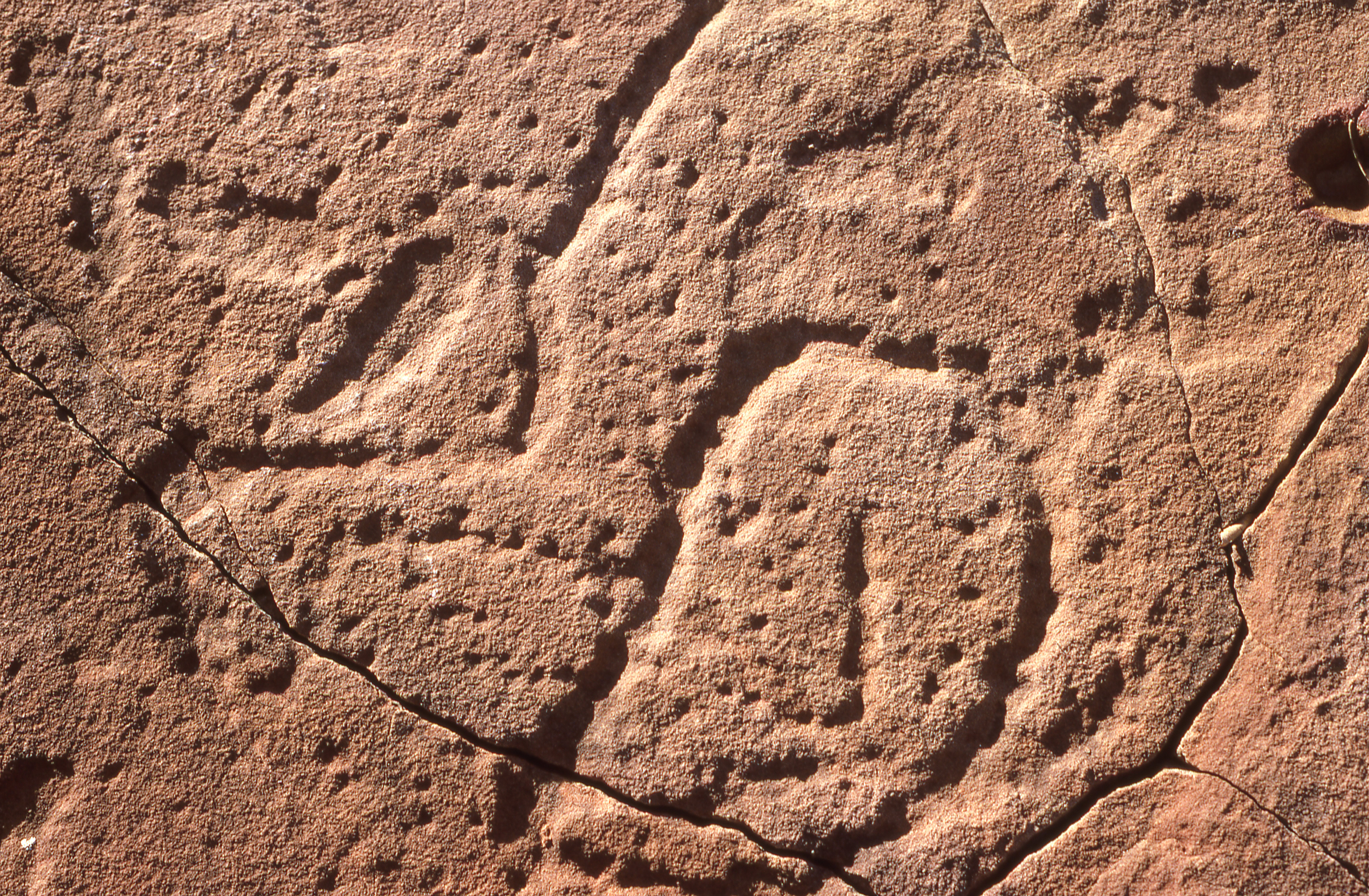

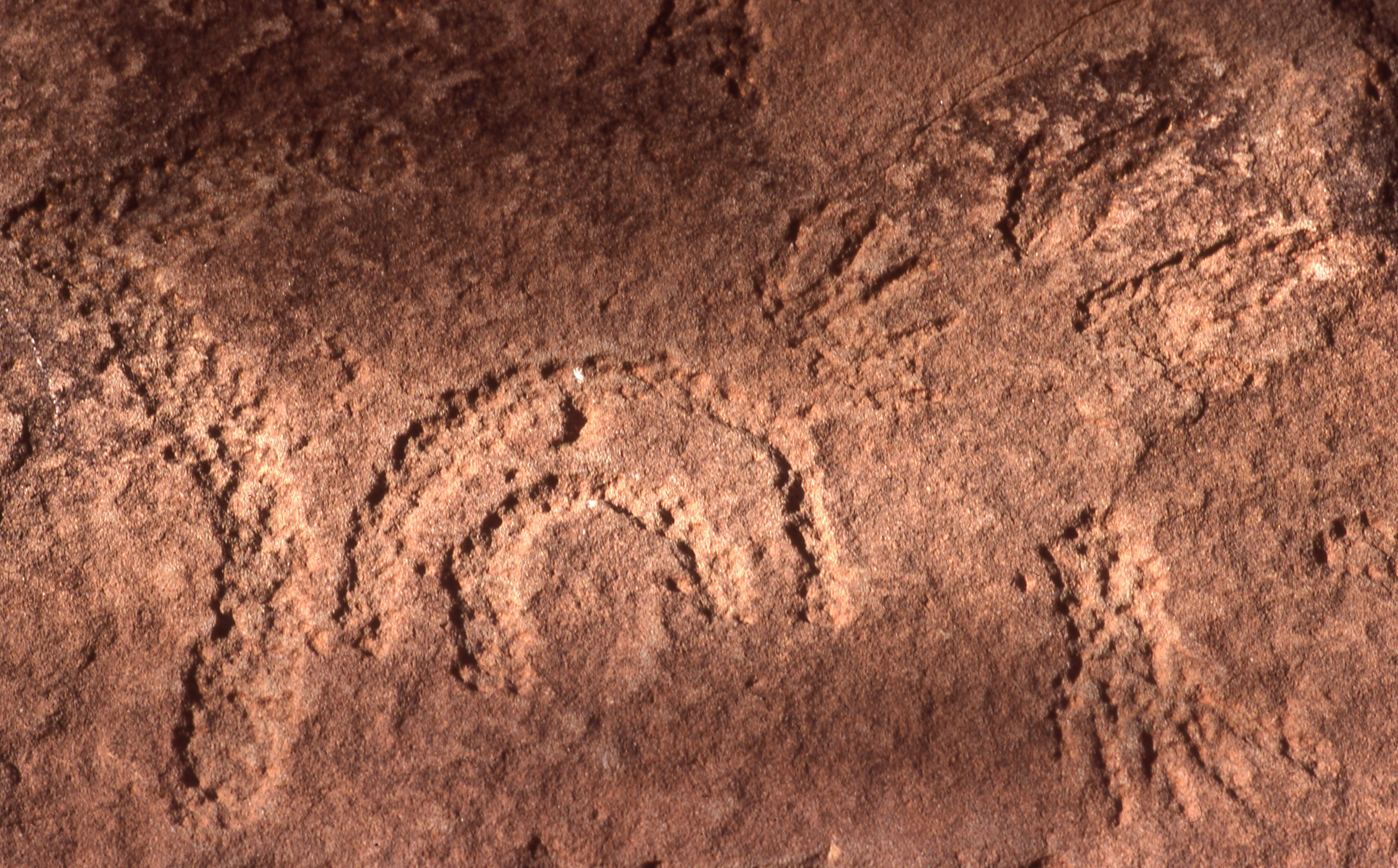

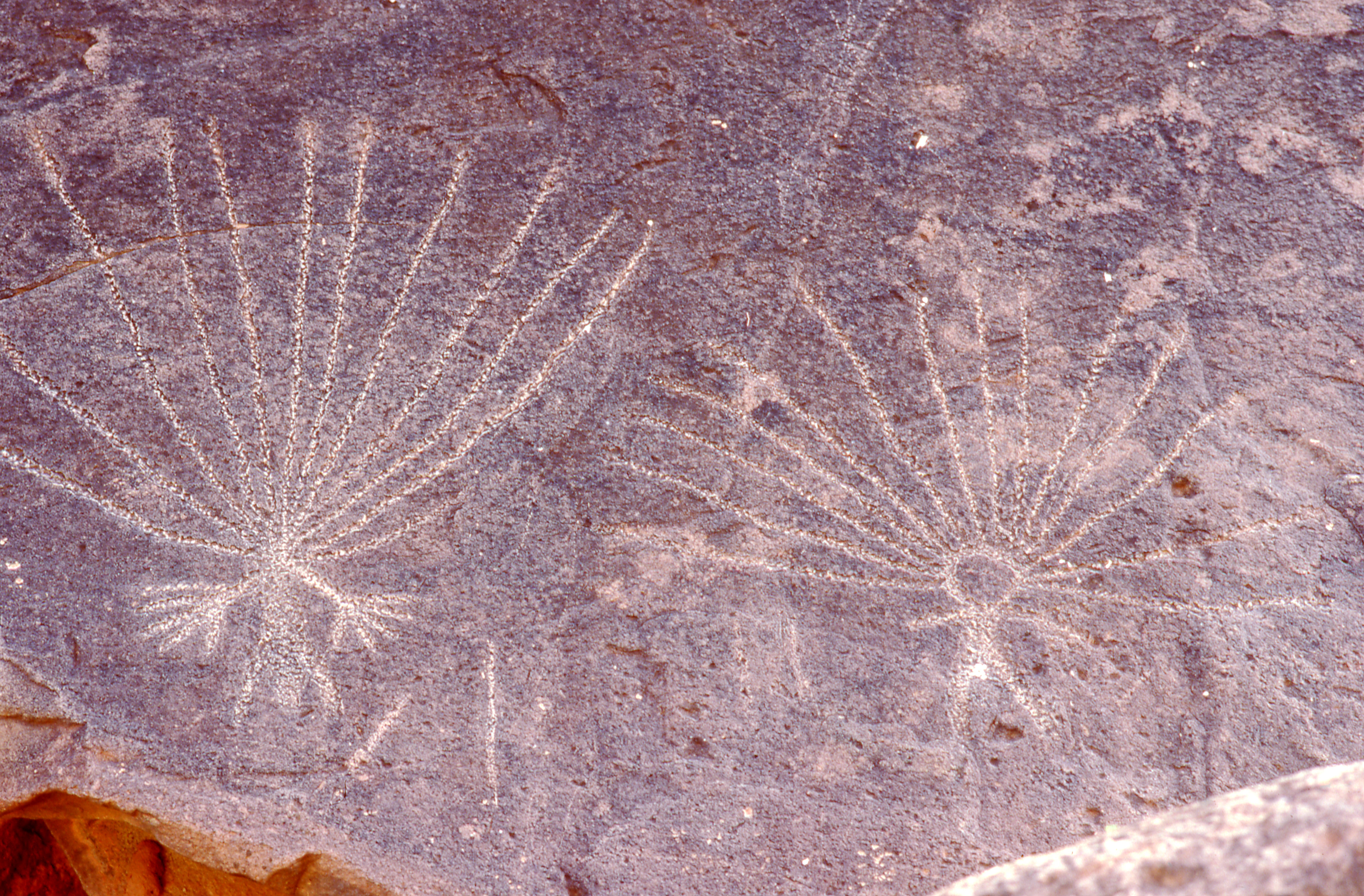

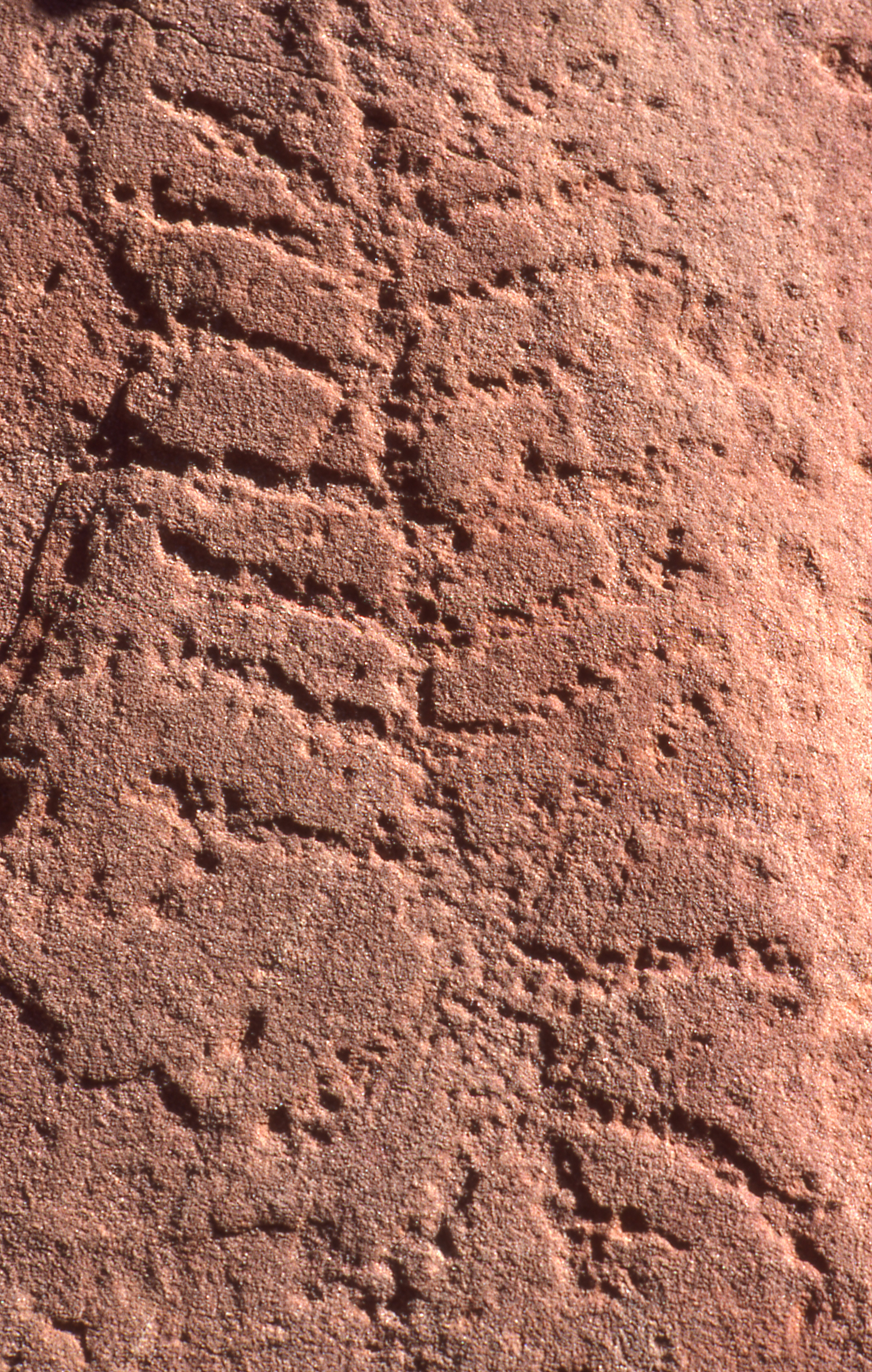

== See also ==
- Protected areas of the Northern Territory
- Chambers Pillar
- Henbury Meteorites Conservation Reserve
- Rainbow Valley Conservation Reserve
- Uluṟu-Kata Tjuṯa National Park
- Watarrka National Park
- Ewaninga Rock Carvings Conservation Reserve
