= Clay pan =

Clay pan may refer to

- Claypan, a dense layer in the subsoil with high clay content
- Clay playa, a type of dry lake
