= Rainbow Valley Conservation Reserve =

Nature reserve in the Northern Territory of Australia

- IUCN category V (protected landscape/seascape)
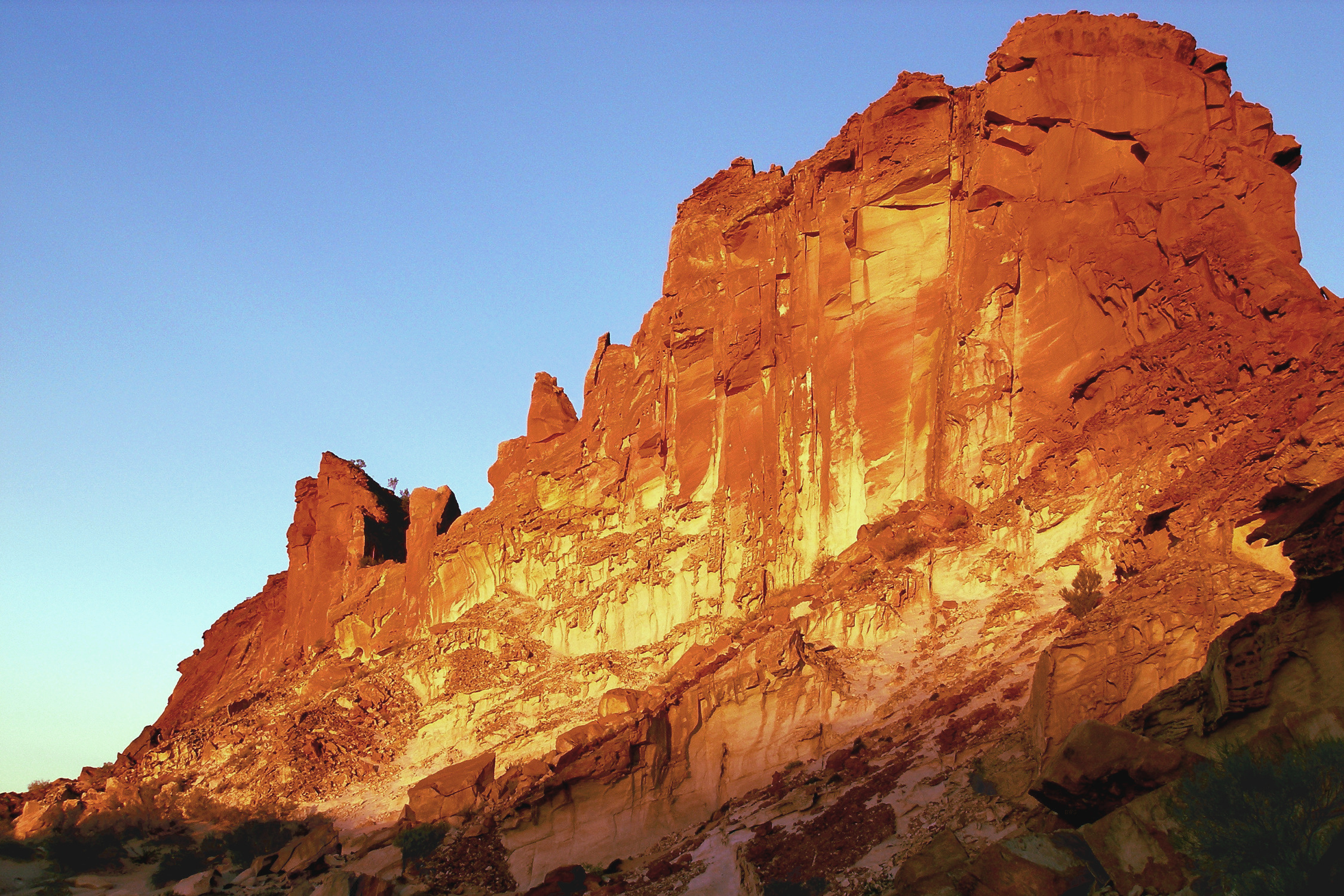
- Sunset light on the bluff at a sharp angle

- Location within Northern Territory
- Location: Northern Territory
- Nearest city: Alice Springs
- Coordinates: 24°20′00″S 133°39′00″E
- Area: 24.83 km^{2} (9.59 sq mi)
- Established: 1990
- Visitors: 6800 (in 2014)
- Governing body: the Twertentyeye group of Upper Southern Arrernte people and the Parks and Wildlife Commission of the Northern Territory (PWCNT)
- Website: Official website

Rainbow Valley Conservation Reserve is a protected area located south of Alice Springs, Northern Territory in Australia. The reserve was established in 1990 to protect the unique sandstone formations and the Aboriginal art, artifacts and sacred natural objects within an area of 24.83 km^{2} (9.59 sq mi) around a large sandstone bluff. The sandstone layers in the main formation resemble the coloured stripes of a rainbow, with the red-orange hues of sandstone that is rich with iron creating a strong contrast with the lighter shaded sandstone that turns pale yellow or gold in the late day sun as it shines on the northwest-facing cliffs.

Rainbow Valley's main sandstone formation is known as Wurre by the local Aboriginals, the Twertentyeye group of Upper Southern Arrernte people, and is a significant part of their homeland which they call Imarnte. Since 2008, the area has been jointly managed by the Twertentyeye and the Parks and Wildlife Commission of the Northern Territory (PWCNT) and is the first conservation reserve to have a joint management plan.

== Geography ==
The Rainbow Valley access road is located 75 km (47 mi) south of Alice Springs as a branch off the Stuart Highway. The unsealed dirt access road heads east then southeast for 22 km (14 mi) to a parking lot situated on the west side of a claypan that extends northwest from the base of the main sandstone formation. Since there are some sandy sections along the access road, the official park site declares the road as "recommended for 4WD vehicles only". The joint management plan's official document, however, refers to the access road as "suitable for conventional vehicles driven with care" but still recommends 4WD for the final 1.4 km (0.87 mi) around the claypan. A plan to re-align and improve the final section was in place as of June 2008.

The reserve is located in the arid centre of the country where rain is irregular and droughts are common. The nearest place with official records, Alice Springs, has a median annual rainfall of 286 mm (11.3 in) and an evaporation rate of more than 3,000 mm (120 in) per year. No permanent water sources exist on the surface though there is an aquifer not far below the surface. A single rockhole does contain rainwater for long periods and was therefore an important source for the Aboriginal people after significant rainfall.

== Geology ==
The cliffs and rocky outcrops in Rainbow Valley are composed of 350 million year old Hermannsburg Sandstone. Below the surface there is a layer of Mereenie Sandstone which becomes exposed above ground level in the James Range, a mountain range to the south of the reserve. Various exposed sandstone joints, eroded honeycomb holes, iron-stained sandstone and fossils are found in the formations. Since these sandstones are very delicate they can be damaged by any human interaction. Climbing on or disturbing the formations is prohibited. The claypans are also delicate and visitors are advised to stay off them unless they are dry and a permit is obtained.

The coloured bands in the rock layers of Rainbow Valley were created during a much wetter time in the history of this very dry region. Heavy rains would cause the reddish, iron-rich sandstone to dissolve and the subsequent dry seasons would cement those dissolved minerals on the surface, staining them a deeper red. The dark red caprock contains the most iron and is more resistant to erosion than the lighter coloured sandstone layers, which delays the eventual collapse and disintegration of the formations.

A marked trail leads to another featured formation called Mushroom Rock where fairy martin nests are located high up on the rock wall.

== Flora and fauna ==
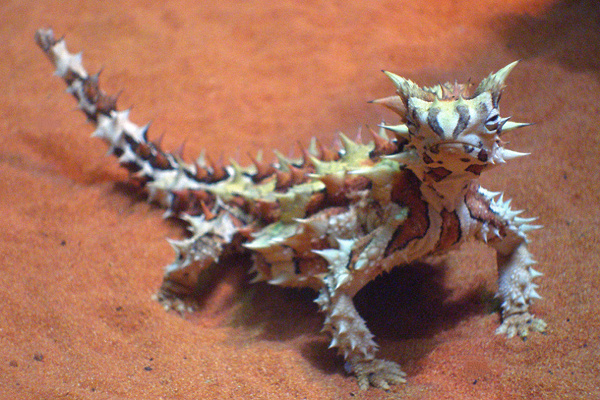
Thorny devil

More than 400 plant species are found in Rainbow Valley including spinifex grasslands, acacia shrubs and coolibah trees in the western part of the reserve. Mulga trees grow close to the sandstone formations and even on top of them. Desert oaks are more common on the east side of the main formation.

The eremophila Rainbow Valley is a sandplain shrub listed as vulnerable under the Environment Protection and Biodiversity Conservation Act 1999 (EPBC). The species survives only in a very restricted range and is not protected in any other reserve. Daviesia arthropoda is another rare shrub that grows on sand dunes in the reserve.

The observed animal species are 110 birds, 20 mammals, 46 reptiles and three frogs. Emus, bats, dingoes and honeypot ants are significant animals in the local Aboriginal culture. Bat species include the Gould's wattled bat and the lesser long-eared bat.

Migratory black, brown and pied honeyeaters use the grevillea and eremophila shrubs as their breeding habitat, while the white-winged fairywren's habitat includes the zygochloa and spinifex grasslands. The grey falcon, redthroat and red-tailed black cockatoo are listed as lower risk near threatened under the Territory Parks and Wildlife Conservation Act (TPWCA).

The euro is the most observed mammal, while the black-flanked rock-wallaby is listed as vulnerable by the EPBC and near threatened by the TPWCA - the only mammal with a conservation listing in the reserve. The thorny devil and the trilling frog also live in the reserve.

== Aboriginal significance ==
More than forty Aboriginal archaeological sites have been found and recorded. These sites include petroglyphs (engraved rock), pictographs (painted rock), grinding stones, stone tools, quarries and camp sites. All archaeological sites are in a restricted access area which requires permission and a guide to enter.

To the south of the main sandstone formation, a massif called Ewerre by the Twertentyeye is registered as a sacred site, as well as all the surrounding area within 50 m (160 ft) of that rock. The black rocks lying on the northern side of the main formation are also considered significant natural objects that are not to be moved from their current locations.

In consideration of both the Aboriginal culture and the ideals of conservation of the area, visitors may only explore in the designated viewing and camping areas on the southwest side of the claypan, and along the trail to Mushroom Rock or other officially marked trails. All other areas, including the claypan, are restricted access requiring a guide.

== Facilities ==
Visitors may camp in two designated areas. A camping fee is required and payable on site. There are gas barbecues, firepits, picnic tables and pit toilet facilities available.

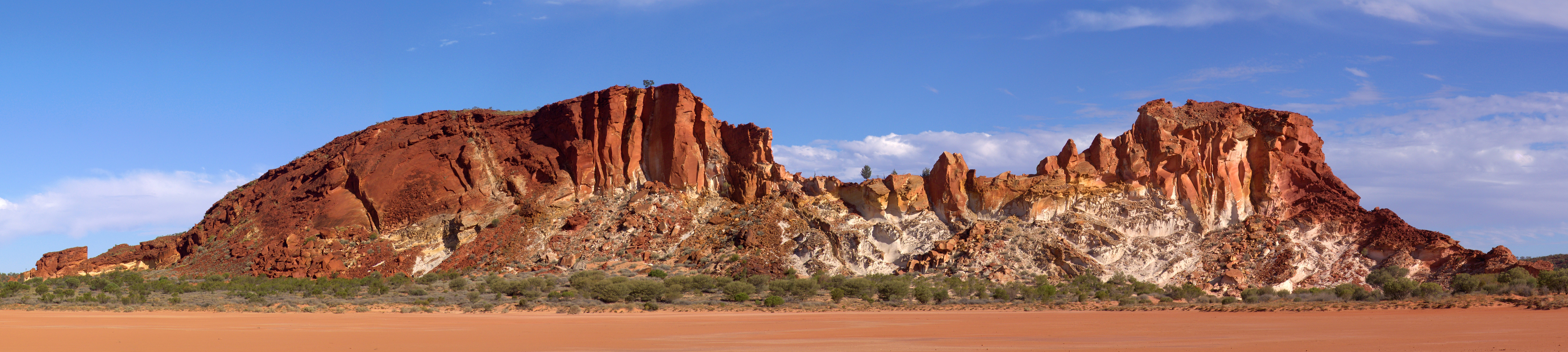
The main sandstone formation seen from the claypan

== See also ==
- Chambers Pillar
- Ewaninga Rock Carvings Conservation Reserve
- Henbury Meteorites Conservation Reserve
- Karlu Karlu / Devils Marbles Conservation Reserve
- Uluṟu-Kata Tjuṯa National Park
- Watarrka National Park
- West MacDonnell National Park
