= Arrange =

Arrange is a mythological figure from the Aboriginal Australian creation myth of the Alyawarre people for Karlu Karlu. In the myth, the figure Arrange, who is also referred to as the devil man, comes from Ayleparrarntenhe. Arrange was making a hair belt, which is a traditional adornment worn only by initiated men, while he was on his journey. As he twirled the hair into strings, he dropped clusters of hair on the ground, which turned into the boulders of Karlu Karlu seen today. When he returned, he spat on the ground, creating the granite boulders from the central part of Karlu Karlu.

== See also ==
- Karlu Karlu / Devils Marbles Conservation Reserve
