= Ayleparrarntenhe =

Hill in Australia

Ayleparrarntenhe is a twin-peaked hill east of the Devil's Marbles Conservation Reserve in the Northern Territory of Australia. It is the mythological home of Arrange, a mythological figure of the Alyawarre people. Arrange is part of the creation myth of Karlu Karlu, the Alywawarre name for this formation.
