= Wycliffe Well =

Abandoned UFO tourist attraction in the Northern Territory, Australia

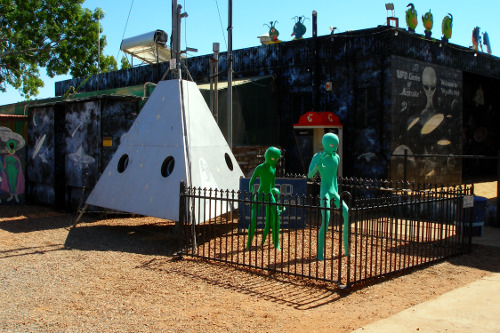
- Wycliffe Well in 2007, before abandonment

- Interactive map of Wycliffe Well
- Coordinates: 20.800°S 134.233°E
- Country: Australia
- State: Northern Territory

Wycliffe Well is an abandoned UFO tourist attraction consisting of a former roadhouse, petrol station, caravan park and restaurant on the Stuart Highway, 375 kilometres (233 mi) north of Alice Springs in the Northern Territory, Australia. Gaining interest in the site from the late 1980s onwards by UFO enthusiasts after a newspaper article, it went through two owners as a UFO tourist attraction, proclaiming itself as the "UFO capital of Australia," before being bought by United Petroleum. It was then abandoned following a major flood in 2022.

== History ==
Wycliffe Well initially took its name from a water well built in 1875. The area was purchased in 1985 by former Royal Australian Navy sailor Lew Farkas as a small roadhouse store. Facing little competition for hundreds of kilometres, according to Farkas, the site grew to become a caravan park. The previous owners of the site contacted him about alleged UFO sightings, though Farkas stated that the previous owner had kept the sightings secret so as not to scare off prospective buyers.

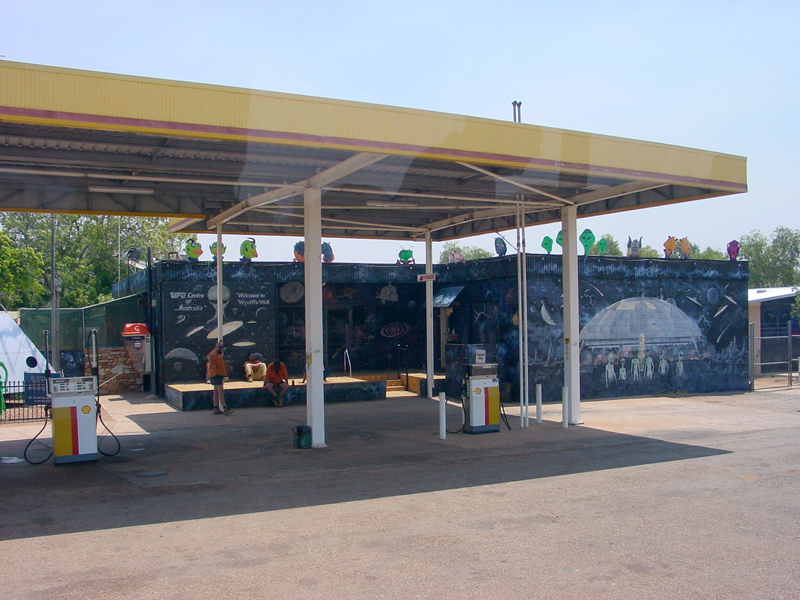
Wycliffe Well in 2002

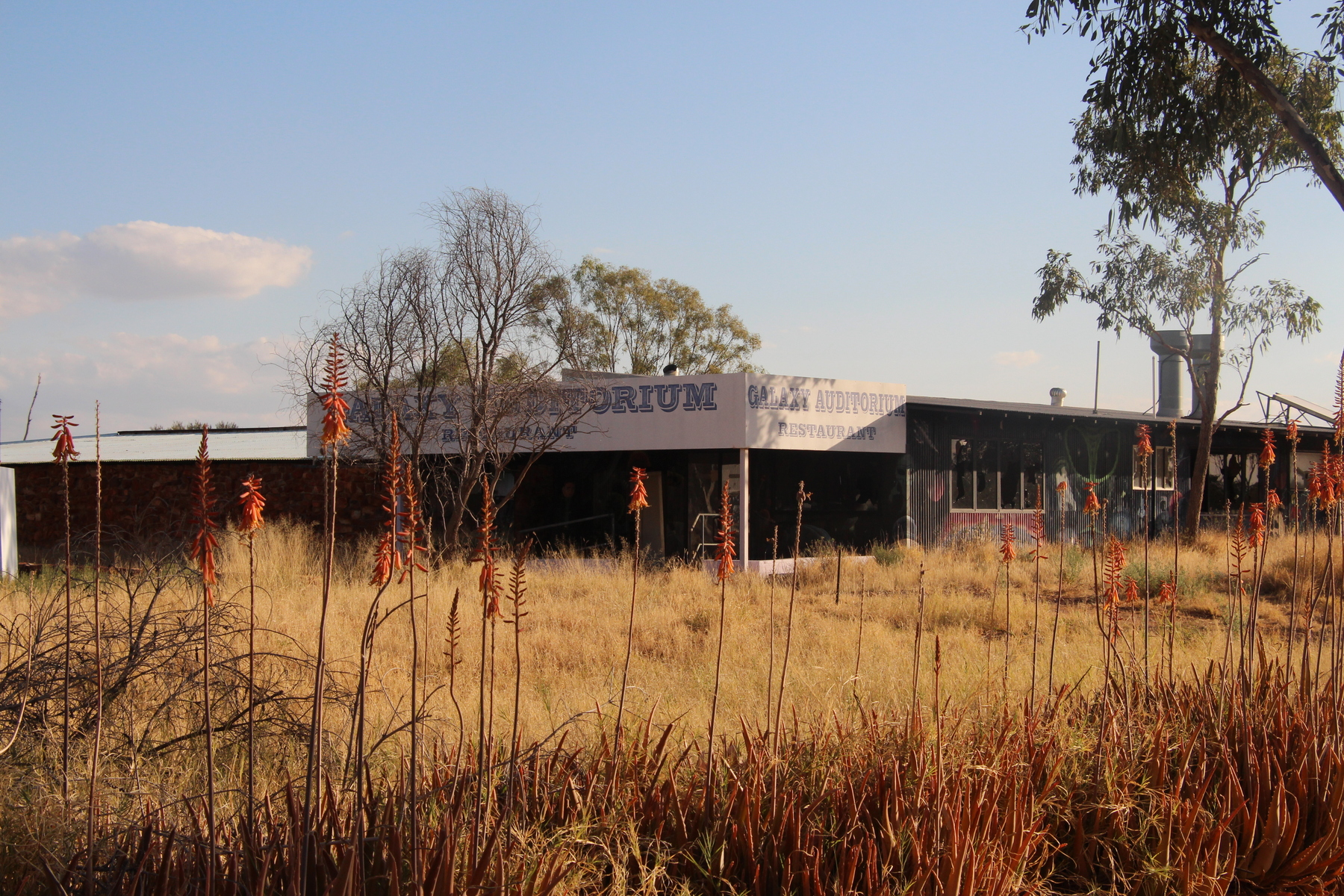
The Galaxy Auditorium restaurant in 2023

In the late 1980s, a story in the Tennant Times newspaper about potential sightings at Wycliffe Well caused international interest in the site to grow, and Farkas shifted the marketing of his business to entirely revolve around aliens. He has stated that he spent about $4 million over 25 years to do so, also building a 300-seat Galaxy Auditorium restaurant and a nearby lake. Attractions included murals and souvenirs, a book ledger of so-called UFO sightings and night tours. After some time, the roadhouse began to call itself "the UFO capital of Australia."

A potential buyer of the premises was reported in 2008. In 2009 or 2010, Farkas sold the business to Anthony Vanderzalm, also known as Arc, who continued to collect alien paraphernalia for the premises including a prop alien corpse from the set of a Hollywood movie. Vanderzalm later sold it to United Petroleum. The company was largely interested in selling fuel at the station, and the UFO aspect of the location became less important. A Vice article in 2017 described the site as "broken, faded, unloved." The Daily Telegraph reported in March 2019 that it had "one of the best beer selections in the Northern Territory." By August 2019, three Indian-Australian entrepreneurs, Nikhilesh Jalla, Surya Mandarapu and Vamsi Koneru, were managing the property. In September 2021, an investigation into the site was made by the Liquor Commission after police found at least 30 people intoxicated and around 12 "engaged in fist-fights" that August. It found that the site had breached its liquor licence.

A major flood event in 2022 forced the site's operators to evacuate the station. It became abandoned, and was vandalised after the water receded. Mastotermes darwiniensis termites began to quickly eat away at the wood in the site's buildings including the Galaxy Auditorium restaurant. Tourism Central Australia CEO Danial Rochford stated in 2024 that he hoped the site would one day be restored, but that there was a lack of money for investment in the site.

== Conspiracy theories ==
Theories concerning the importance of the area to the alleged UFOs include the alignment of landforms, tectonic plates, and man-made structures. Another is that the US military intelligence base Pine Gap is nearby.
