= Napwerte / Ewaninga Rock Carvings Conservation Reserve =

Protected area in the Northern Territory, Australia

- IUCN category V (protected landscape/seascape)
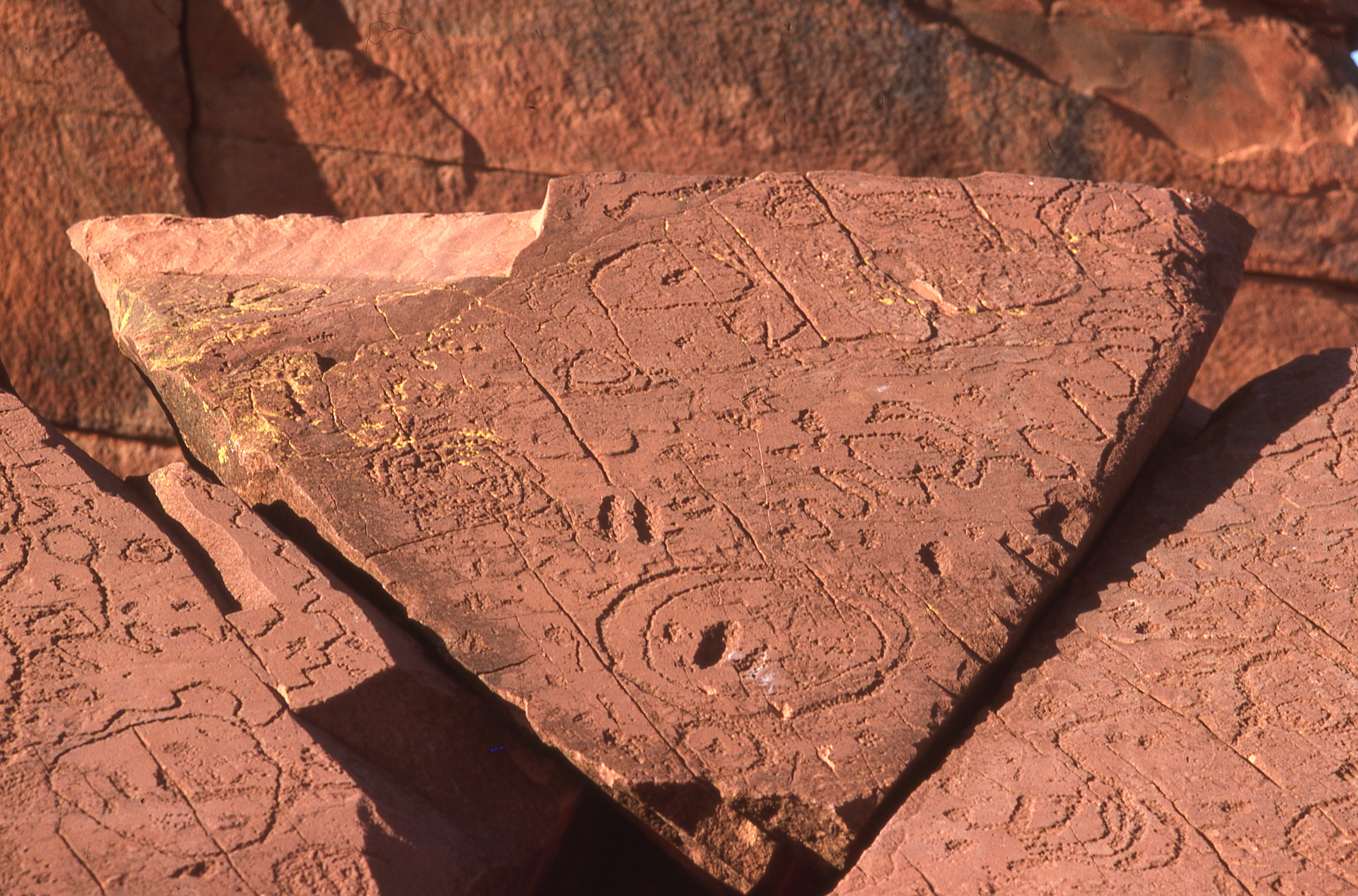
- Rock carvings at Ewaninga

- Location within Northern Territory
- Location: Northern Territory
- Nearest city: Alice Springs
- Coordinates: 24°01′S 133°57′E
- Area: 6 ha (15 acres)
- Established: 1970

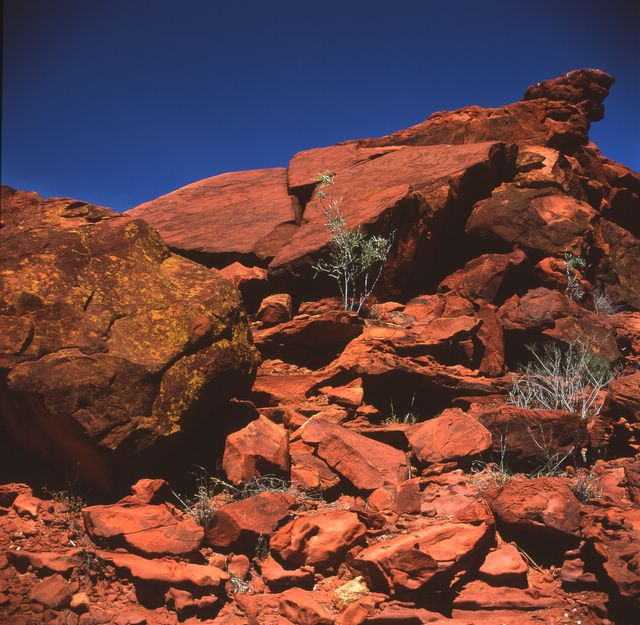
Rock outcrop showing petroglyphs at Ewaninga

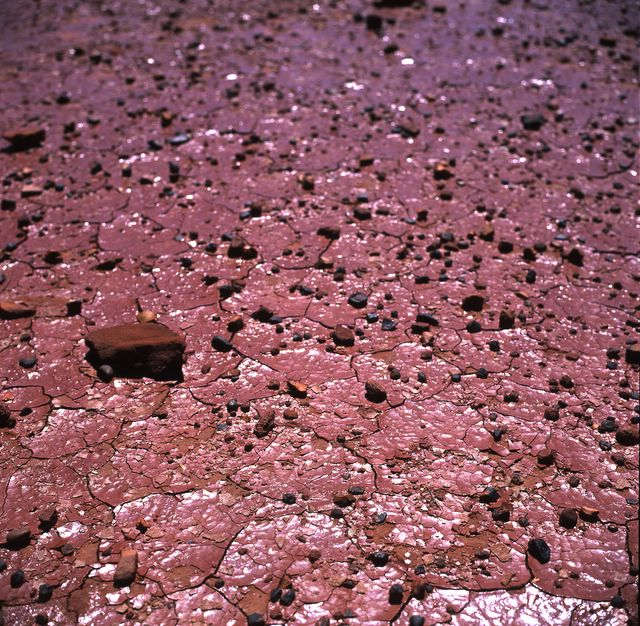
Claypan surface at Ewaninga

The Napwerte / Ewaninga Rock Carvings Conservation Reserve is a protected area in the Northern Territory of Australia consisting of an area of low sand dunes, rocky outcrops and a claypan about 35 kilometres (22 mi) south of Alice Springs. It is significant because of a large number of Aboriginal rock carvings and that it is a sacred men's site of the Arrernte people who are its traditional owners.

Napwerte (pronounced na-poor-ta) is the Arrernte name from the rock outcrop within the reserve and it was officially duel named in 2014.

== Description and history ==
The conservation reserve was gazetted on 20 November 1996. The claypan is a slightly concave surface approximately 100m across. It retains water after even light rain, thus attracting many birds and animals. The claypan and surrounding outcrops are also a significant archaeological site.

The conservation reserve contains many prehistoric abraded and pecked engravings that provide an example of central Australian rock art and the activities of early Arrernte people.

The main feature of the area is a set of about 1,000 petroglyphs, distributed among the rock outcrops to the south and south-east of the claypan. Most of the petroglyphs are non-representational, consisting of circles, lines and other geometric motifs, though there are some examples of animal tracks. The motifs have been compared with those found elsewhere in Central Australia and Tasmania.

Aspects of the petroglyphs such as their motifs and degree of weathering suggest an age as great as 30,000 years, although a more precise age is unknown. It is known that, when the engravings were new, they would have stood out as white against the red stone but they have now been weathered to red; this process takes hundreds or thousands of years. Flood describes the petroglyphs as Panaramitee-style, which, based on dating of other Paranamitee sites, could give a date as early as 40000 years ago.

An Indigenous land use agreement was signed by the Central Land Council and the Northern Territory Government on 30 November 2005 for the purpose of granting the conservation reserve as Aboriginal land under the Aboriginal Land Rights Act 1976.

The conservation reserve is considered a significant link to the activities of the early Arrernte people of the region. Permission to access the site has been granted by the Arrernte traditional owners.

In December 2004, laser-scanned 3D images of the petroglyphs were included in the exhibition "Extremes – Survival in the Great Deserts of the Southern Hemisphere" by the National Museum of Australia.

== See also ==
- Chambers Pillar
- Henbury Meteorites Conservation Reserve
- N'Dhala Gorge Nature Park
- Rainbow Valley Conservation Reserve
- Uluṟu-Kata Tjuṯa National Park
- Watarrka National Park
- West MacDonnell National Park
- Napwerte / Ewaninga Rock Carvings Conservation Reserve travel guide from Wikivoyage
