= Henbury Meteorites Conservation Reserve =

Protected area in the Northern Territory, Australia

- IUCN category III (natural monument or feature)
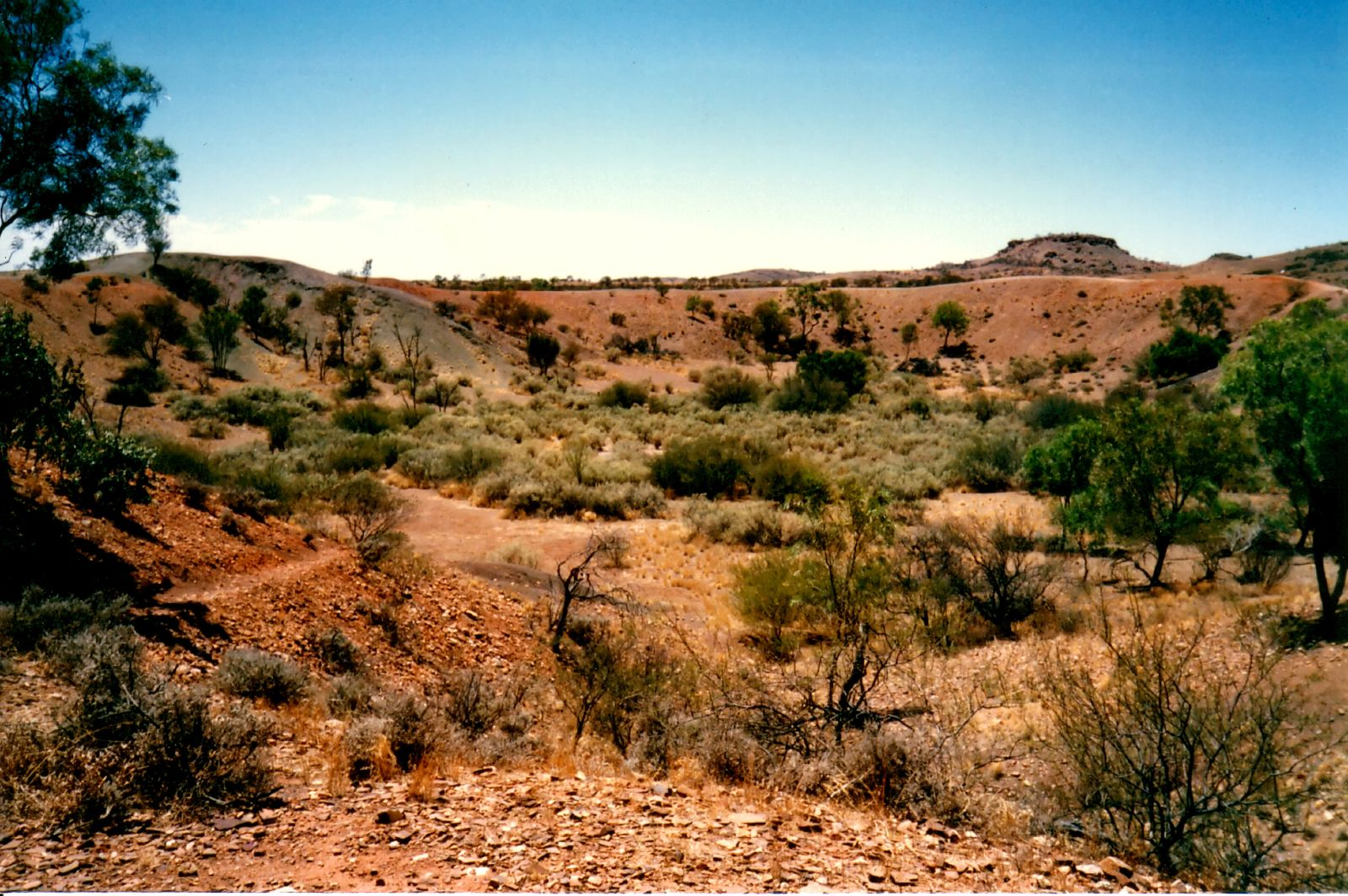
- Henbury Meteorites Conservation Reserve

- Location within Northern Territory
- Location: Northern Territory, Ghan
- Nearest city: Alice Springs
- Coordinates: 24°34′21″S 133°8′52″E
- Area: 16 ha (40 acres)
- Established: 1964
- Governing body: Parks and Wildlife Commission of the Northern Territory

Henbury Meteorites Conservation Reserve is a protected area in the Northern Territory of Australia located in the locality of Ghan.

Henbury craters are a result of one of the few impact events that have occurred in a populated area. (Other examples are Kaali crater in Estonia and 2007 Carancas impact event in Peru).

== Description ==
The reserve is located 125 km (78 mi) south west of Alice Springs and contains over a dozen craters, which were formed when a fragmented meteorite hit the Earth’s surface.

Henbury is one of five meteorite impact sites in Australia with remaining meteorite fragments and one of the world's best preserved examples of a small crater field. Henbury was the earliest documented example of impact cratering in Australia.

== Meteorite impact craters ==
Henbury craters
- Location: Australia

Impact crater structure
- Confidence: Confirmed
- Diameter: 7 to 180 m (23 to 591 ft)
- Depth: 15 m (49 ft)
- Age: 4,700 years old

At Henbury there are 13 to 14 craters ranging from 7 to 180 m (23 to 591 ft) in diameter and up to 15 m (49 ft) in depth that were formed when the meteor broke up before impact. Several tonnes of iron-nickel fragments have been recovered from the site. The site has been dated to ≤4.7 thousand years ago based on the cosmogenic ^{14}C terrestrial age of the meteorite and 4.2±1.9 thousand years ago using fission track dating.

The craters are named for Henbury Station, a nearby cattle station named in 1875 for the family home of its founders at Henbury in Dorset, England. The craters were discovered in 1899 by the manager of the station, then went uninvestigated until interest was stirred when the Karoonda meteorite fell on South Australia in 1930. The first scientific investigations of the site were conducted by A.R. Alderman of the University of Adelaide who published the results in a 1932 paper entitled The Meteorite Craters at Henbury Central Australia. Numerous studies have been undertaken since.

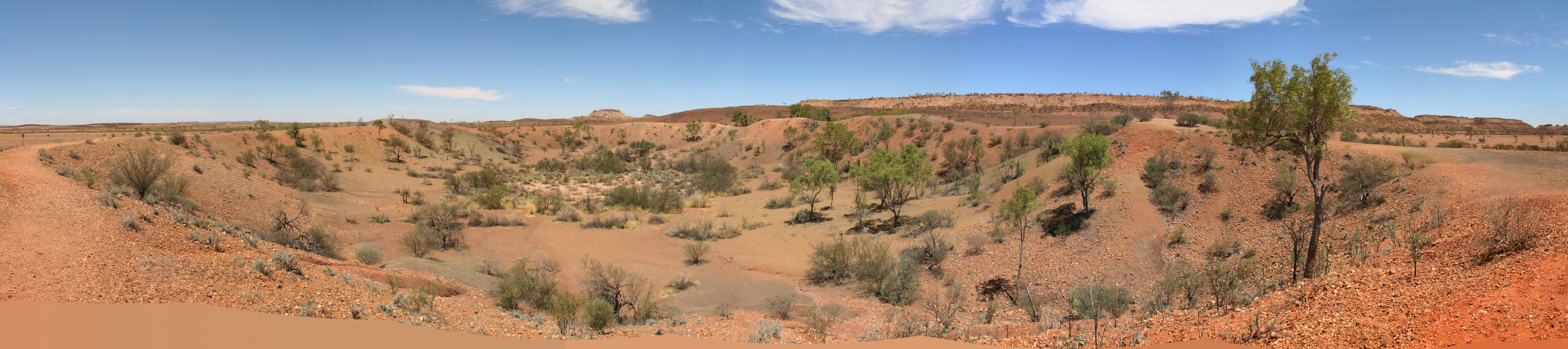
The largest crater at the impact site.

== Cultural significance ==
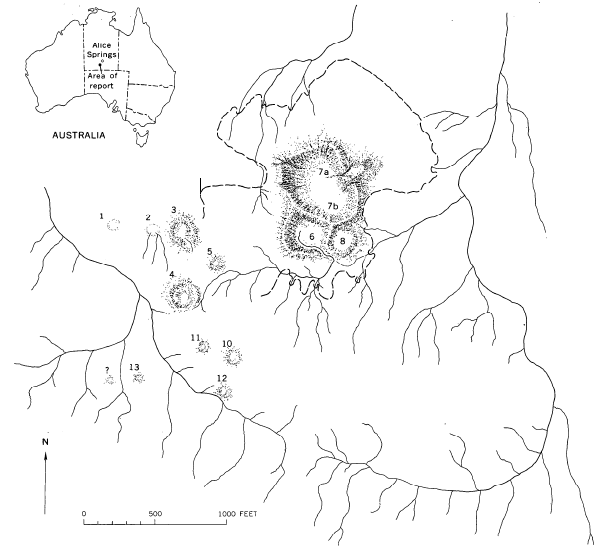
Map of the Henbury craters in Australia. The dashed line indicates the limit of ejecta from the larger craters.

The Henbury crater field lies at the crossroads of several Aboriginal language groups, including Arrernte, Luritja, Pitjantjatjarra, and Yankunytjatjara. It is considered a sacred site to the Arrernte people and would have formed during human habitation of the area. J.M. Mitchell said that older Aboriginal people would not camp within a couple of miles of the Henbury craters. An elder Aboriginal man who accompanied Mitchell to the site explained that Aboriginal people would not drink rainwater that collected in the craters, fearing the "fire-devil" would fill them with a piece of iron. The man claimed his paternal grandfather had seen the fire-devil and that he came from the Sun. An Aboriginal contact said of the crater field: tjintu waru tjinka yapu tjinka kurdaitcha kuka, which roughly translates in the Luritja language as "A fiery devil ran down from the Sun and made his home in the Earth. He will burn and eat any bad blackfellows." This indicates a living memory of the event.

A different story was recorded by Charles Mountford that attributed the largest crater's formation to an anthropomorphic lizard woman (called Mulumura) tossing soil out of the crater, forming its bowl-shape. The soil discarded by Mulumura explained the piles of meteoritic iron around the craters and the presence of ejecta rays (which are unique to terrestrial impacts but are now gone due to prospecting at the site). This probably relates to Dreaming stories about ancestral lizard beings from the area of Henbury station near the Finke River, just north of the crater field. The Parks and Wildlife Commission of the Northern Territory give the Arrernte name for the crater field as Tatyeye Kepmwere or Tatjakapara.

In 1980, the conservation reserve was listed on the now-defunct Register of the National Estate. The craters were listed as one item on the Northern Territory Heritage Register on 13 August 2003.

== See also ==
- Chambers Pillar
- Ewaninga Rock Carvings Conservation Reserve
- Rainbow Valley Conservation Reserve
- Uluṟu-Kata Tjuṯa National Park
- Watarrka National Park
- West MacDonnell National Park

== Literature ==
- Svend Buhl, Don McColl: Henbury Craters & Meteorites - Their Discovery, History and Study. Edited by S. Buhl, Meteorite Recon, Hamburg 2012, ISBN 978-3-00-039026-5.

Records
Preceded by Rio Cuarto craters	The last impact event on Earth; 4.2 thousand years ago—1300 BC	Succeeded by Kaali crater
