= Chambers Pillar =

Sandstone formation in the Northern Territory of Australia

Coordinates: 24°52′S 133°49′E

Location in Northern Territory of Australia

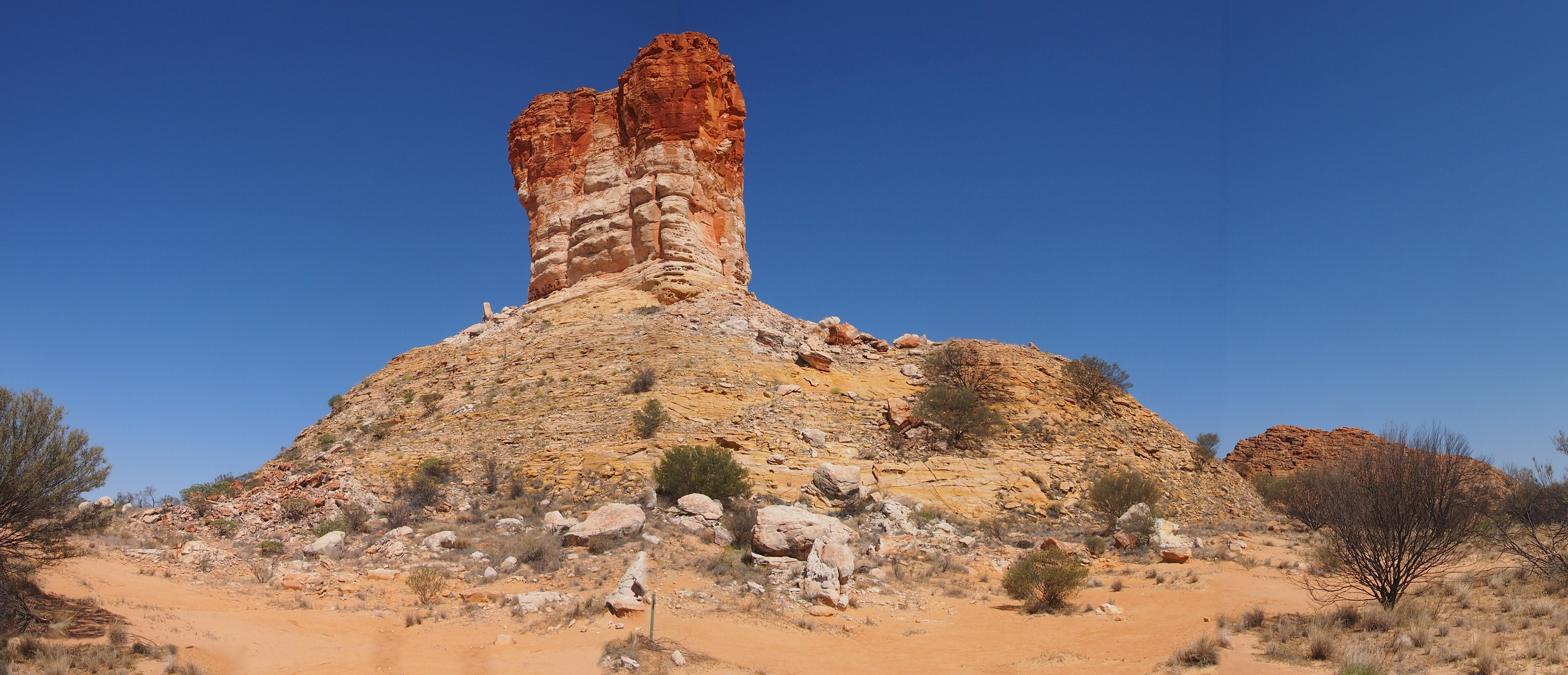
Chambers Pillar

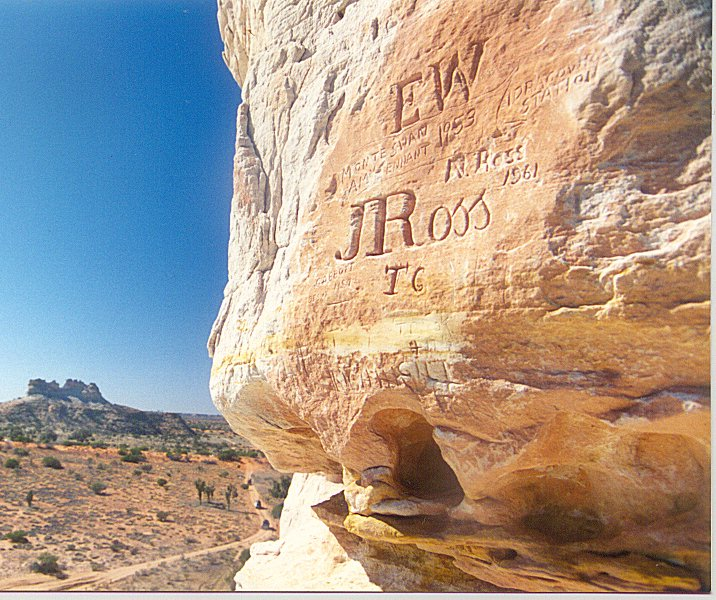
Graffiti on Chambers Pillar

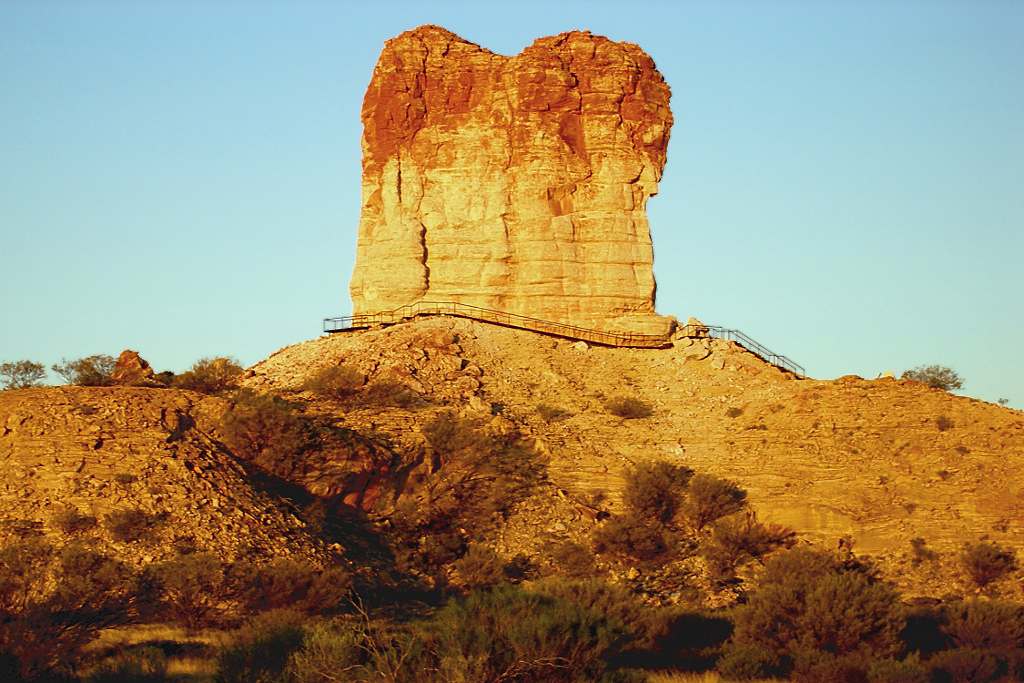
Chambers Pillar at sunset, 2007

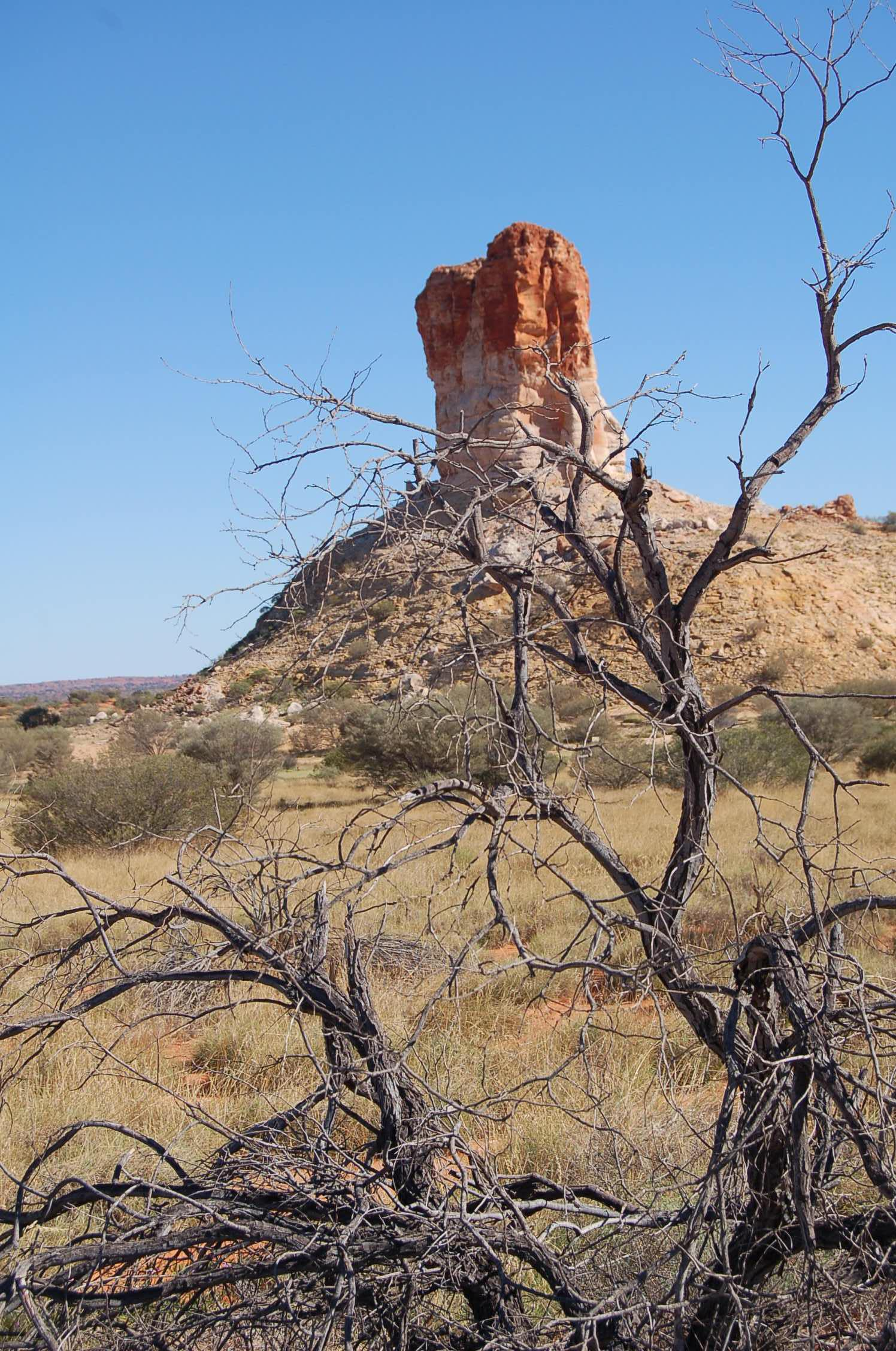
Chambers Pillar

Chambers Pillar (Aboriginal name Idracowra or Etikaura) is a sandstone formation some 160 km (100 mi) south of Alice Springs in the Northern Territory of Australia.

== Formation ==
Erosion by wind and rain has left an isolated pillar of 350-million-year-old sandstone, rising 50 m (160 ft) above the surrounding plain. The rock formation and the surrounding area of 340 hectares, or 3.4 km^{2} (1.3 sq mi), are officially named the Chambers Pillar Historical Reserve.

== History ==
John McDouall Stuart was the first European to see Chambers Pillar, reaching the site in April 1860, and naming it after James Chambers, one of his South Australian sponsors. The rock formations was once an important landmark for pioneers travelling from Adelaide to Alice Springs prior to the establishment of the railways in the 1920s. Several early explorers including Alfred Giles and John Ross, leaders of the second cross-continental expedition in 1870, have left their mark on the rockface. The initials of each are still visible as J Ross and AC 1870. Subsequently numerous other visitors have illegally added graffiti by carving names in the soft sandstone at the base of the pillar.

The pillar is a Site of Aboriginal Significance and features in the dreamtime traditions of local Indigenous Australians. Their legend says that the pillar is the Gecko ancestor Itirkawara, who was exiled for taking a wife from the wrong skin group. When he and his wife stopped to rest among the sand dunes they each turned into one of the locally prominent rock formations: Itirkawara became the Pillar; and his wife became Castle Rock, about 500 metres (1,640 ft) to the north-east.

== Services ==
Chambers Pillar is reached via the unsealed Old South Road from Alice Springs to Maryvale Station. A 4WD vehicle is required after the Maryvale turnoff to Chambers Pillar. Drivers will encounter deep sand drifts and steep jump ups, as well as rolling sandy hills with limited sight lines and the deeply corrugated surfaces typical of Australian outback roads. Camping is permitted at a campground between Chambers Pillar and Castle Rock with amenities including barbeques, carpark, picnic area and public toilets. The road to Chambers Pillar is adventurous. Near the village Titjikana the road becomes worse. The sand road is deep.

== See also ==
- Ewaninga Rock Carvings Conservation Reserve
- Henbury Meteorites Conservation Reserve
- Rainbow Valley Conservation Reserve
- Uluṟu-Kata Tjuṯa National Park
- Watarrka National Park
- West MacDonnell National Park
