= Claypan =

Dense, slowly permeable layer in subsoil

Claypan is a dense, compact, slowly permeable layer in the subsoil. It has a much higher clay content than the overlying material, from which it is separated by a sharply defined boundary. The dense structure restricts root growth and water infiltration. Therefore, a perched water table might form on top of the claypan. In the Canadian classification system, claypan is defined as a clay-enriched illuvial B (Bt) horizon.

== Location ==
Claypan is present in a wide area of the central United States (about 4 million ha) across multiple states such as Kansas, Oklahoma, and Illinois. It can also be found in Australia throughout the south-west Queensland.

== Formation ==
Claypan is formed in different parent materials depending on geological locations, such as floodplains. The formation of the claypan relates to a lack of vegetation coverage, soil particle size distribution, and high rainfall. The lack of vegetation coverage makes soil become more susceptible to raindrop attacks. When the raindrops hit on bare soil with high energy, the fine sand, silt, and clay particles are re-arranged to plug all the pore spaces. When all the pores are filled, a packed layer is formed to limit the water infiltration.

== Characteristics ==
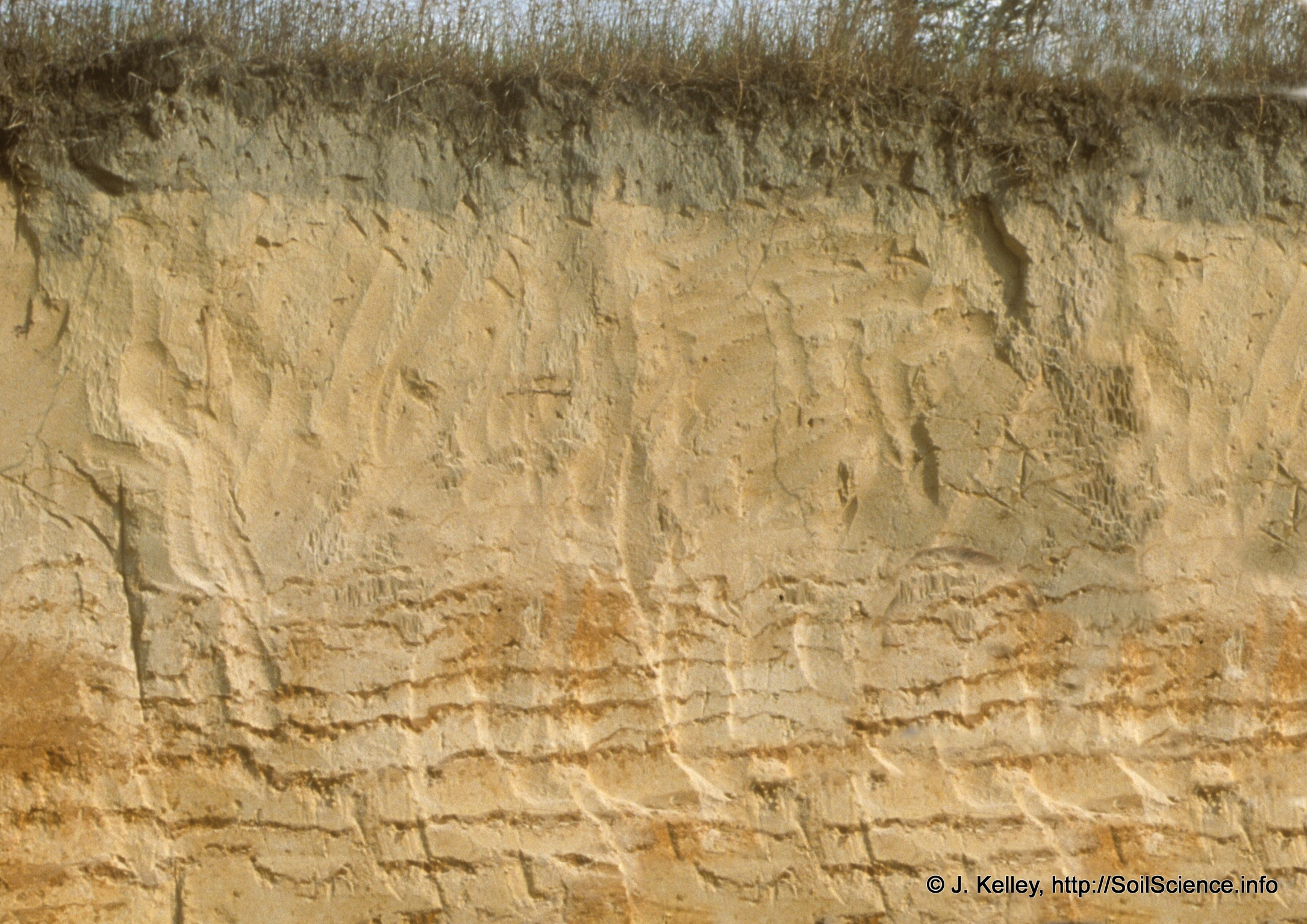
Lamella clay-sandy soil

The dominant material is the montmorillonite clay material which has a high swell and shrinks characteristics depending on the soil water content. In the dry season, evaporation moves water from the deep horizon toward the soil surface through capillary action. The water removal results in shrinkage of clay, and the soil becomes dry and hard. In the wet season, high precipitation leads to a swell of clay to absorb water. The high moisture content results in wet and sticky clay texture. When the clay swells, the low saturated hydraulic conductivity prevents the vertical water infiltration to the deeper soil horizon. It leads to water perches above the claypan layer.

The water permeability is restricted in the claypan layer resulting in low soil aeration. The water-holding capability of the claypan is high. However, most of the stored water is not available for the plant since water evaporates frequently and soil pore size is tiny.

Since the claypan is acidic and clay-rich, there is high sorption of Al, K and Fe oxides to clay minerals. Therefore, the claypan contains a cations-dominated zone that leads to a relatively high cation exchange capacity (CEC) to absorb and retain nutrients.

The concentration of extractable potassium positively relates to clay content. There is a relatively high extractable potassium content in the claypan due to the accumulation of cations. The high content of aluminium oxidates, and iron oxidates attract phosphorus to clay particles which increases the phosphorus content in the soil.

== Influences on plants ==
The major negative influences of claypan on plants are root restriction, available water limitation and nutrient limitation. The dense structure of the claypan restricts root development.

Plants with shallow roots, might not withstand the soil contraction forces due to the shrinkage of clay in the dry season. The low water infiltration rate and hydraulic conductivity may lead to a perched water table form on top of the claypan layer. Water in the perched water table evaporates instead of uptake by plants, especially in the dry season. In the wet season with high precipitation, water can penetrate throughout the soil. However, the low aeration in saturated soil may result in root rots that reduce the stability of plants.

The acidic, clay-rich characteristics of the claypan lead to phosphorus (P) sorption to clay minerals. Even though the total P content in the claypan is relatively high, they are strongly attracted by the clay particles that are not available for plant use. Therefore, a high amount of P fertilizer is required to increase the available P for plant absorption. Different from P, the high content of potassium (K) in the claypan is available for plant use which reduces the application of potassium fertilizer.

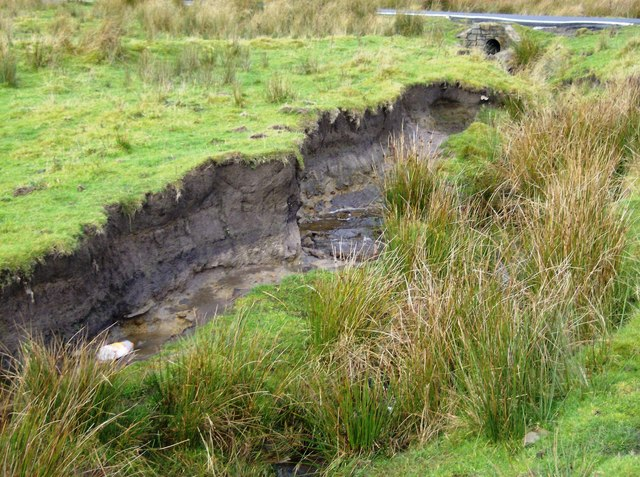
Water erosion. The common is crossed by a number of streams that have eroded rills like this into the soft soil. They become barriers to walking across the common, but also prevent excessive exploration by vehicles, which are technically banned.

== Risk of soil erosion ==
Soil with a claypan layer is highly vulnerable to soil erosion. The low water infiltration rate and the perched water table form on top of the claypan layer largely increase the surface runoff during precipitation with a long duration or high intensity. The runoff water can remove the topsoil with mostly organic matter. It will further reduce the nutrient availability for plants.

== See also ==
- Gilgai
- Hardpan
