= Meeuwsen =

Meeuwsen is a Dutch patronymic surname ("son of Mewis"). "Mewis" or "Meus" is a short form of Bartholomeus/Bartholomew. Notable people with the surname include:

- Goos Meeuwsen (born 1982), Dutch clown
- Johanna Meeuwsen (1857–1942), Dutch missionary
- Mitch Meeuwsen (born 1982), American football player
- Robert Meeuwsen (born 1988), Dutch beach volleyball player
- Terry Meeuwsen (born 1949), American television personality
