= Henk Guth =

Dutch-Australian artist

Henk Gerrit Guth (Arnhem, 1921 – Melbourne, 20 July 2003) was a Dutch artist who had a career in Australia, remembered for "Panorama Guth" (1975–2005), a cyclorama in Alice Springs, Northern Territory.

== History ==
Guth was born in Arnhem, Netherlands, and studied at the Arnhem Academy of Art and Design from 1938 to 1942, then moved to Amsterdam to work as an artist. Guth became part of the Resistance during World War II and he used his skills as a draughtsman to remove the yellow stars from the identity papers of Dutch Jews. Guth was captured by the Gestapo and jailed for six months before being sent to a concentration camp in the north; most likely Westerbork transit camp. Guth escaped from the camp six months later and rejoined the Resistance. Guth was often unwilling to discuss this part of his life; including during lengthy oral history interviews that are available through the Northern Territory Archives Service.

In 1960, searching for broader horizons, Guth migrated to Australia and initially settled in Melbourne. For the next several years he worked as a house painter and teacher for students with disabilities while making travels throughout Victoria and holding exhibitions of his Dutch landscape work. On the verge of returning to Europe Guth travelled to Alice Springs where he fell in love with the surroundings and was particularly enchanted by Ormiston Gorge in the West MacDonnell Ranges. Very soon after Guth moved to Alice Springs he opened an art gallery showing his work, also specialising in works by Aboriginal artists. In 1971 he commenced the work for which he is best known, the "Panorama Guth", the format of which he took from a seascape Panorama Mesdag in The Hague, Holland. The panorama as completed was a realistic Central Australian outback scene painted on 33 pieces of canvas six metres high arrayed as a continuous circle of 20 metres in diameter, the centre of which was a raised viewing platform; the floor was covered with actual soil, stones and other material to reinforce the illusion. Much of the work was done by Fritz Pieters, a fellow artist from Holland. The work, at 65 Hartley Street, Alice Springs, was completed in 1975 and the building was officially opened that year by Prime Minister Gough Whitlam. This building, with its unusual castle-like appearance, became one of Alice Spring' most popular landmarks.

Panorama Guth, clos up, in 1979

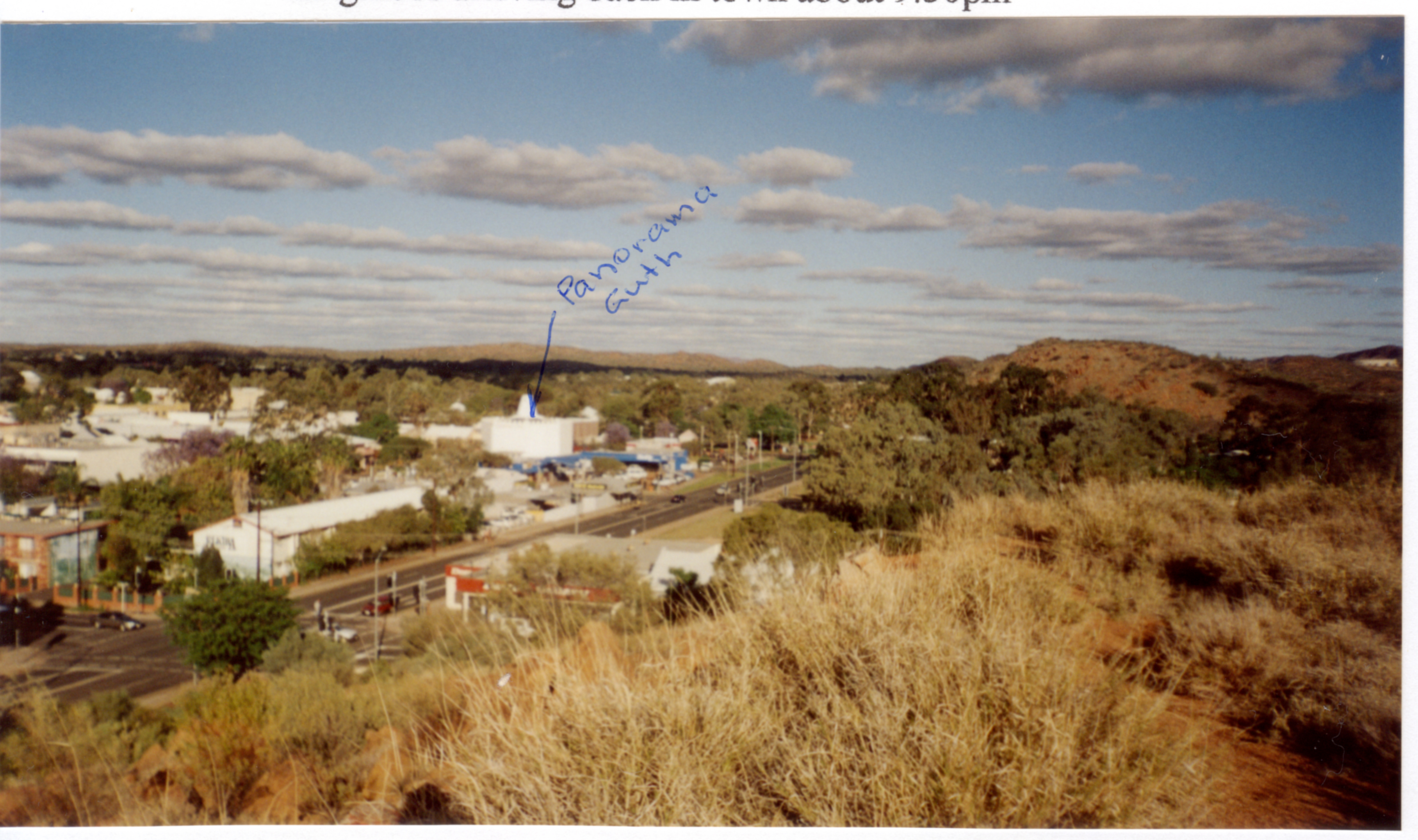
Panorama Guth, from a distance, in 2001

In April 2003, after the gallery almost went bankrupt, it was purchased by local businessmen Terry Leigh and Kevin King. Guth died in July 2003, a few months after the sale of the business, and is buried at Ormiston Gorge facing Mount Sonder. The gorge had been one of Guth's favourite places to paint and, in order to be buried there, the Northern Territory Government granted special permission.

On 30 October 2005 'Panorama Guth' was destroyed by fire for which the cause could not be found. Some other exhibits, (including paintings by Albert Namatjira and his family) and irreplaceable aboriginal artefacts, were saved.

65 Hartley Street was the temporary address of the Mental Health Association of Central Australia and from late 2014 has been the home of the Yubu Napa Art Gallery and Studio, where visitors to Alice Springs can view indigenous artworks and also have the opportunity to meet artists as they work on their artworks. The owners of Yubu Napa Art Gallery and Studio still have visitors coming in asking to see the Panorama.

== Publications ==
Alice Springs as it was published, compiled, and presented by Henk Guth (1985); https://trove.nla.gov.au/work/18961539.

This work combined three photograph collections, with a total of 135 images, showing Alice Springs from the late 1870s to the 1930s.
