= Arnhem =

City and municipality in Gelderland, Netherlands

Arnhem Èrnem (Ernems)
- City and municipality
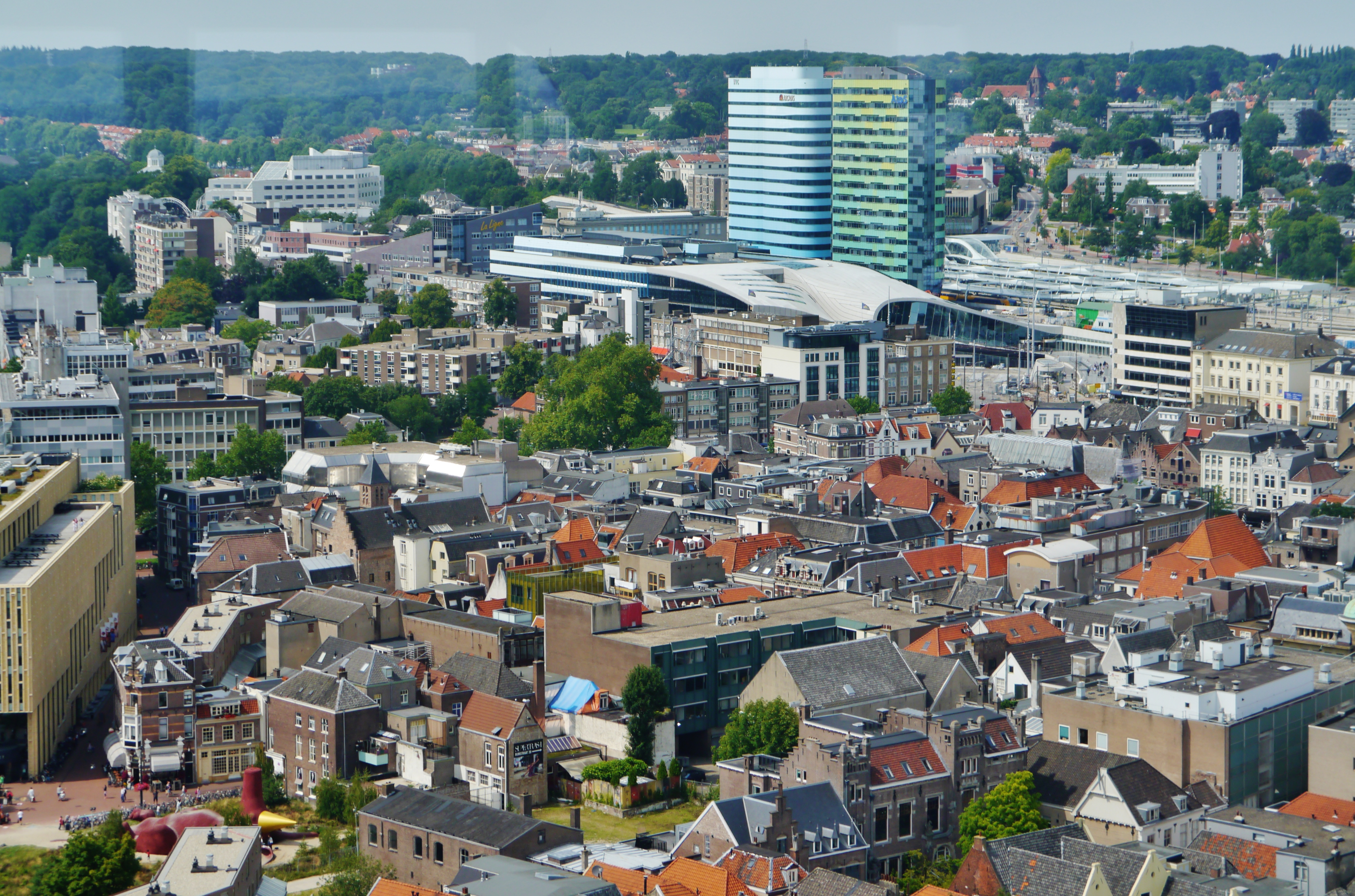
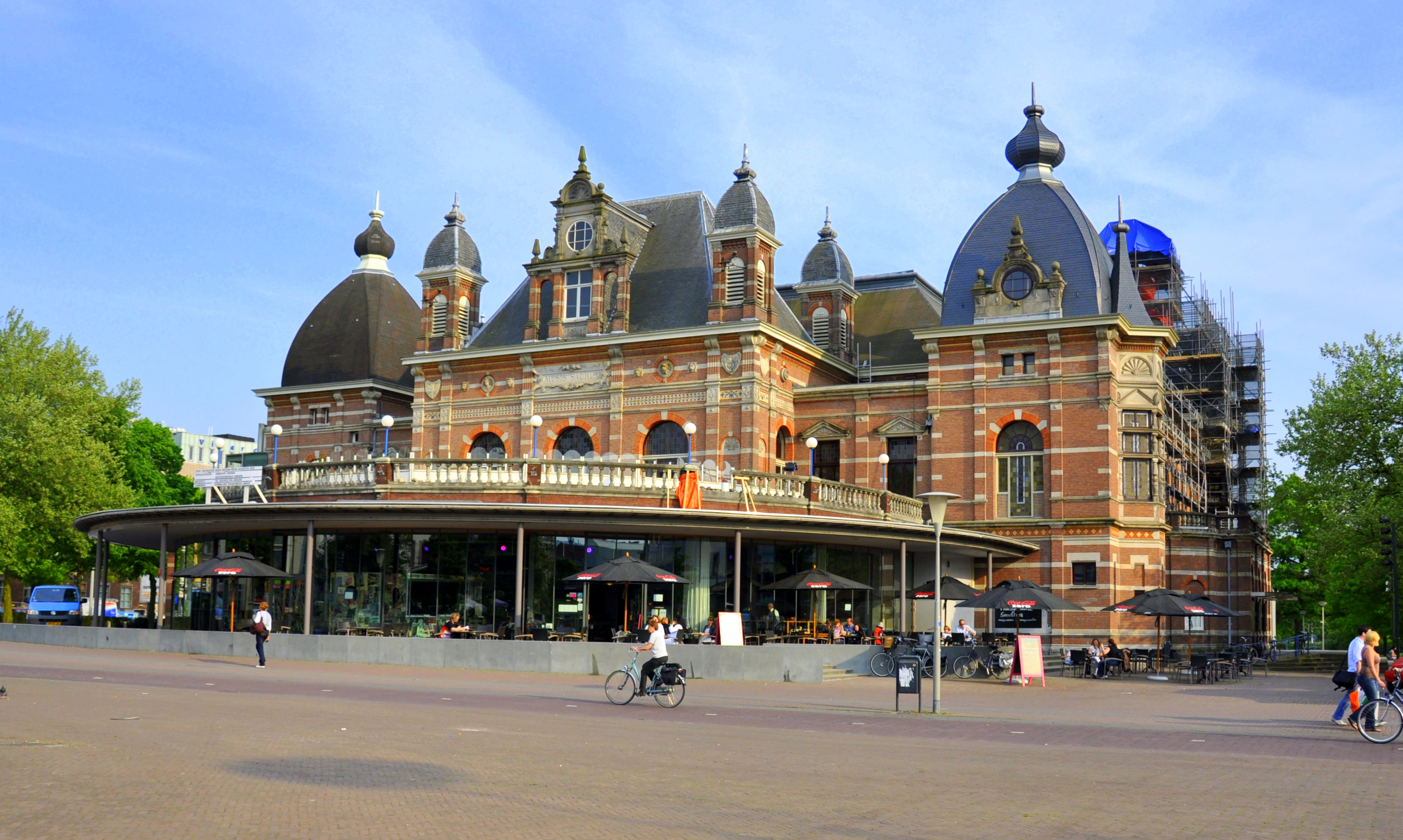
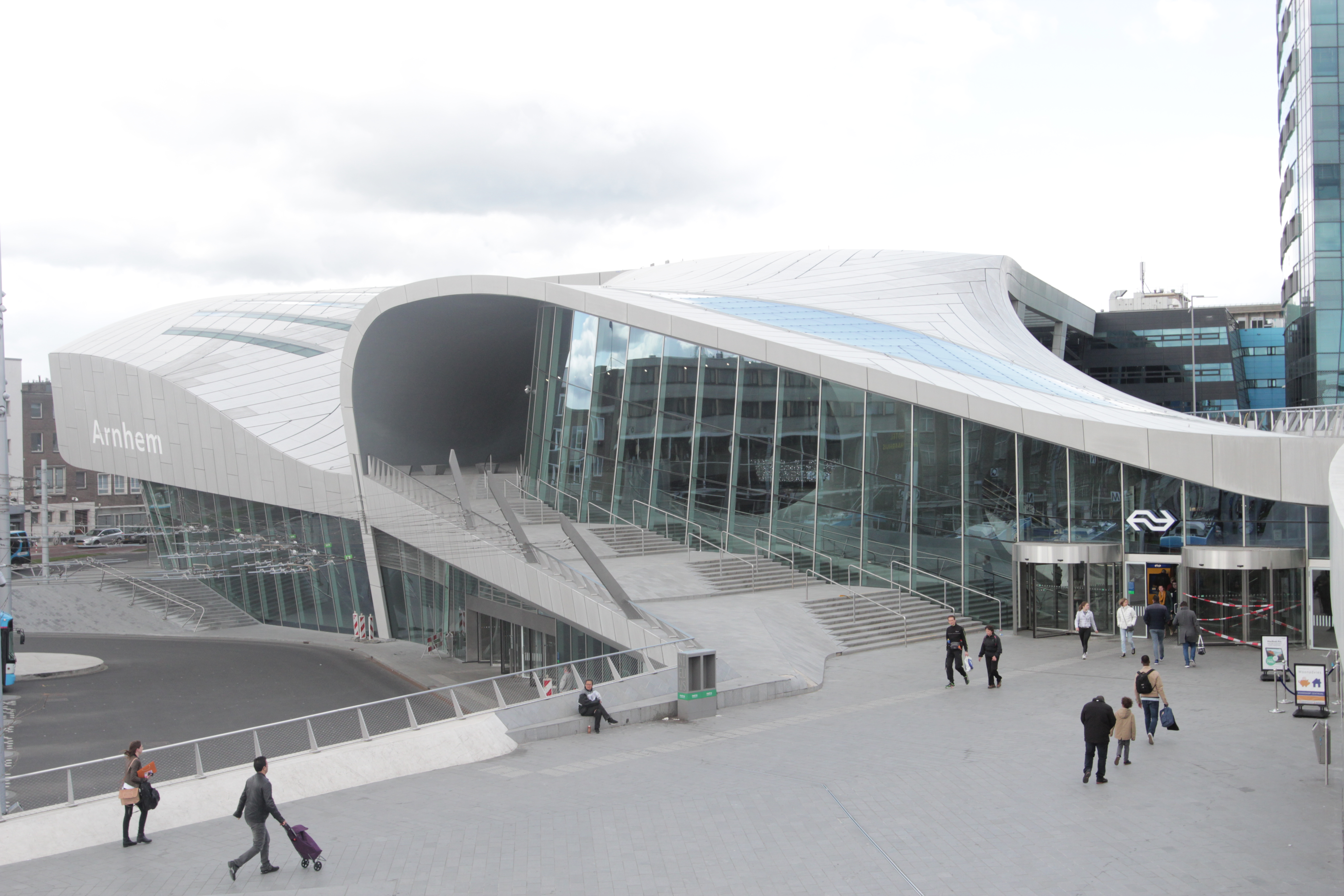
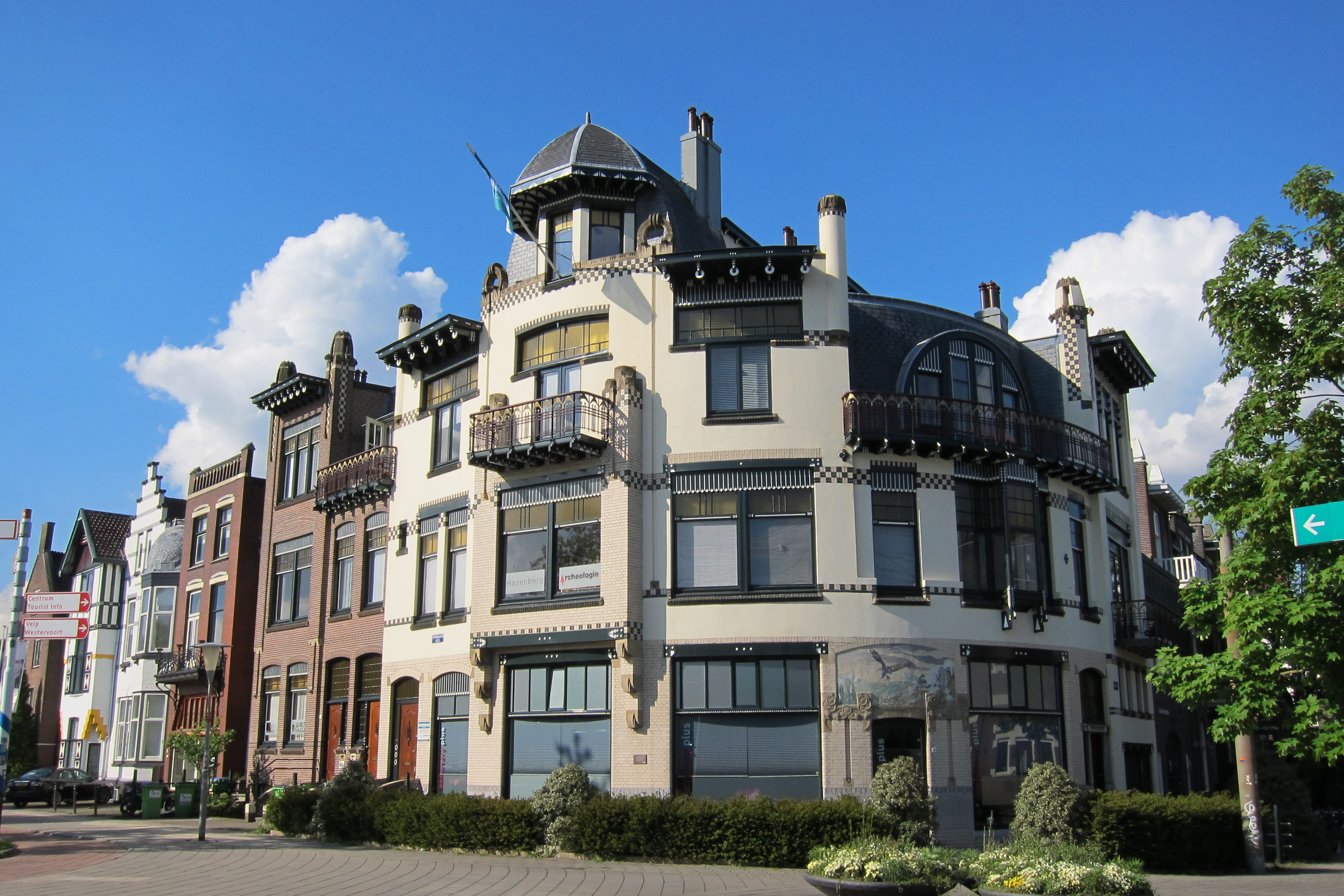
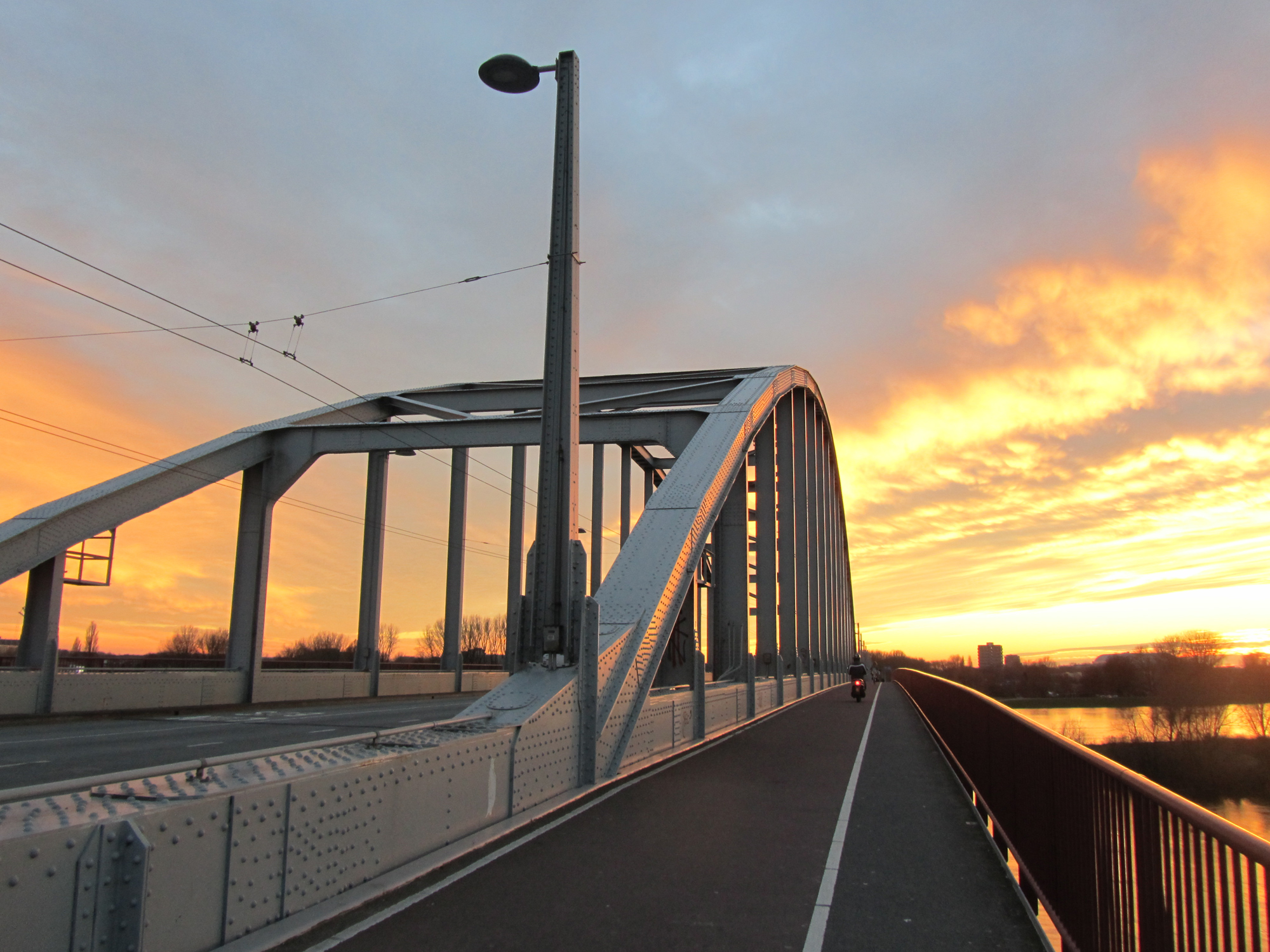
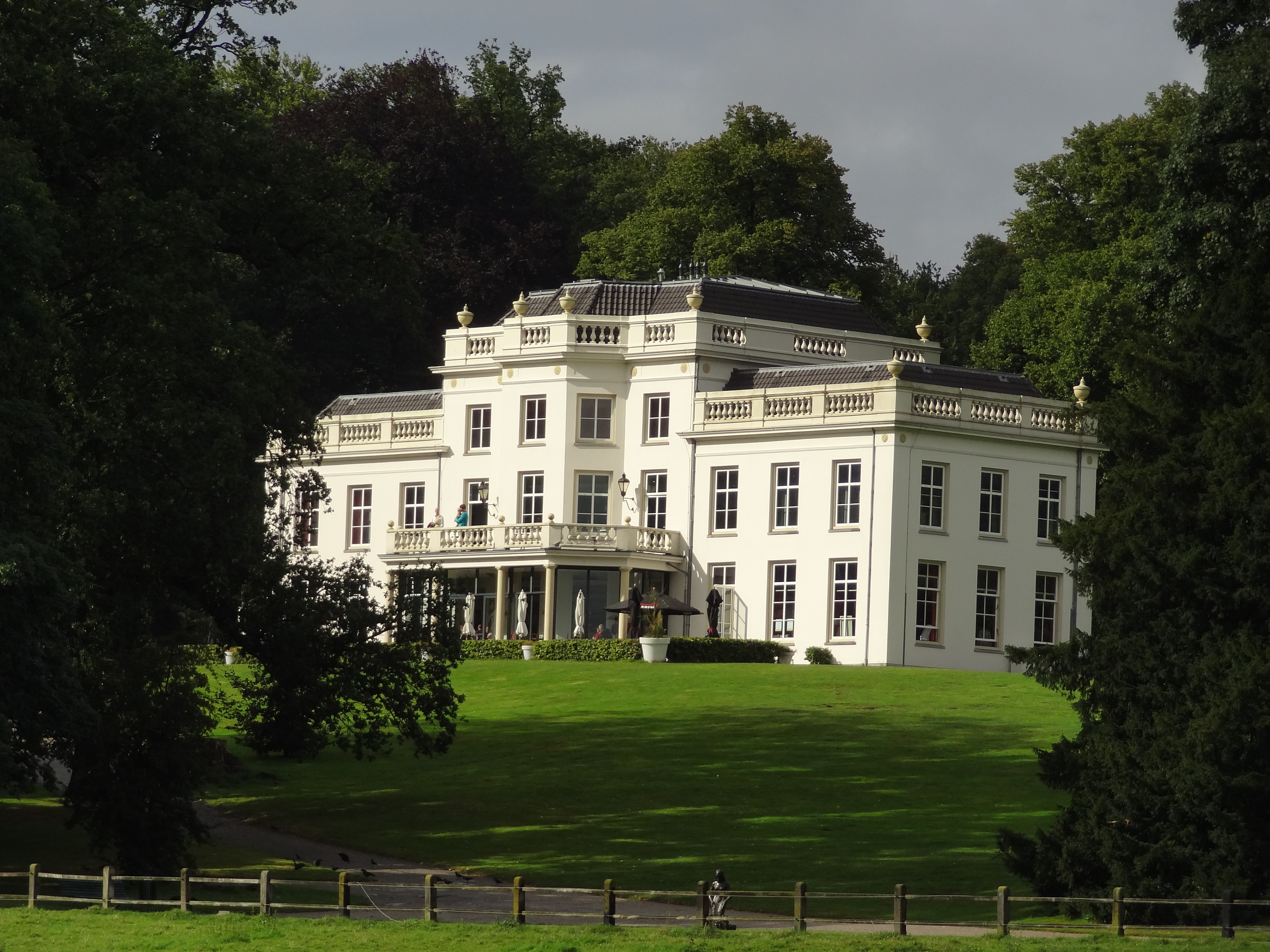
- Skyline of Arnhem from the St Eusebius' Church Musis Sacrum Arnhem Centraal railway station Building by Willem Diehl John Frost Bridge Villa Sonsbeek

- Flag Coat of arms Brandmark
- Nicknames: Ernem, Arnheim, Arra, Nultweezes, Nulzesentwintig, 026
- Interactive map of Arnhem
- Location within the Netherlands Location within Europe
- Coordinates: 51°59′N 5°55′E
- Country: Netherlands
- Province: Gelderland

Government
  - Body: Municipal council
  - Mayor: Ahmed Marcouch (PvdA)

Area
  - Municipality: 101.54 km^{2} (39.20 sq mi)
  - Land: 97.82 km^{2} (37.77 sq mi)
  - Water: 3.72 km^{2} (1.44 sq mi)
- Elevation: 13 m (43 ft)

Population (Municipality, January 2021; Urban and Metro, May 2014)
  - Municipality: 162,424
  - Density: 1,660/km^{2} (4,300/sq mi)
  - Urban: 152,850
  - Metro: 361,048
- Demonym: Ernemmer
- Time zone: UTC+1 (CET)
  - Summer (DST): UTC+2 (CEST)
- Postcode: 6800–6846
- Area code: 026
- Website: www.arnhem.nl

Arnhem (Dutch: [ˈɑrnɛm] or [ˈɑr(ə)nɦɛm]; German: Arnheim [ˈaʁnhaɪm]; Ernems: Èrnem) is a city and municipality situated in the eastern part of the Netherlands, near the German border. It is the capital of the province of Gelderland and its second-most populous municipality (after Nijmegen), located on both banks of the rivers Nederrijn and Sint-Jansbeek, which was the source of the city's development.

Arnhem is home to the Hogeschool van Arnhem en Nijmegen, ArtEZ Institute of the Arts, Netherlands Open Air Museum, Royal Burgers' Zoo, NOC*NSF and National Sports Centre Papendal. The north corner of the municipality is part of the Hoge Veluwe National Park. It is approximately 55 square kilometres (21 sq mi) in area, consisting of heathlands, sand dunes, and woodlands.

Arnhem is the namesake of the Dutch East India Company (VOC) ship Arnhem, which in turn gave its name to Arnhem Land and the Arnhem Land tropical savanna in northern Australia.

== History ==
=== Early history ===
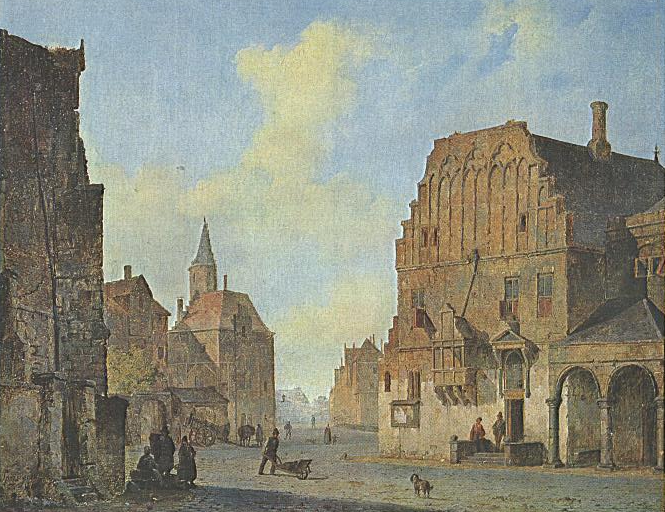
Old city hall

The oldest archeological findings of human activity around Arnhem are two firestones of about 70,000 years ago. These come from the Stone Age, when the Neanderthals lived in this part of Europe. In Schuytgraaf, remnants of a hunters camp from around 5000 BC have been discovered. In Schaarsbergen, twelve grave mounds were found from 2400 BC, which brought the so-called Neolithic Revolution to the area of Arnhem, which meant the rise of the farmers.

The earliest settlement in Arnhem dates from 1500 BC, of which traces have been found on the Hoogkamp, where the Van Goyenstraat is currently located. In the inner city, around the Sint-Jansbeek, traces of settlement have been found from around 700 BC, while the first traces south of the Rhine have been found dating to around 500 BC, in the Schuytgraaf.

Though the early tracks of settlements did show that the early residents of Arnhem descended from the forests on the hills, Arnhem was not built on the banks of the river Rhine, but a little higher along the Sint-Jansbeek. Arnhem arose on the location where the road between Nijmegen and Utrecht and Zutphen split. Seven streams provided the city with water, and only when the flow of the Rhine was changed in 1530, was the city located on the river.

=== Middle Ages ===
Arnhem was first mentioned as such in 893 as Arneym or Arentheym. In 1233, Count Otto II of Guelders from Zutphen, conferred city rights on the town, which had belonged to the abbey of Prüm, settled in, and fortified it. Arnhem entered the Hanseatic League in 1443. In 1473, it was captured by Charles the Bold of Burgundy.

=== 16th and 17th century ===
In 1514, Charles of Egmond, duke of Guelders, took it from the dukes of Burgundy; in 1543, it fell to the emperor Charles V. As capital of the so-called "Kwartier van Veluwe" it joined the Union of Utrecht during the Eighty Years' War in 1579. After its capture from the Spanish forces by Dutch and English troops in 1585 the city became part of the Republic of the Seven United Provinces of the Netherlands. The French occupied the town from 1672 to 1674.

=== 18th and 19th century ===
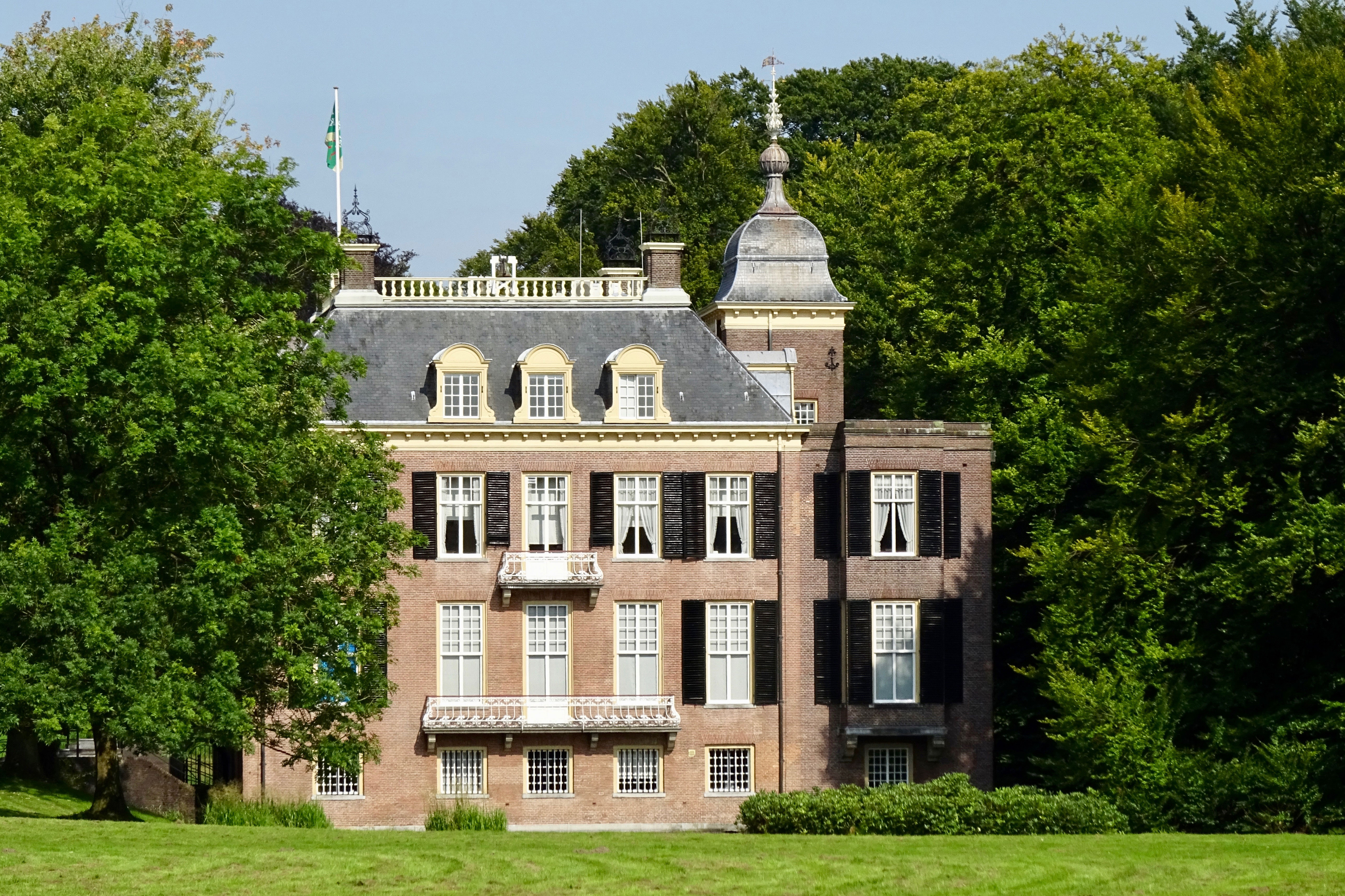
Huis Zypendaal

From 1795 to 1813, it was reoccupied by the French, by both revolutionary and imperial forces.

In the early 19th century, the former fortifications were almost completely dismantled, to give space for town expansion. The Sabelspoort (Sabresgate) is the only remaining part of the medieval walls.

In the 19th century, Arnhem was a genteel resort town famous for its picturesque beauty. It was known as "het Haagje van het oosten" (The Little Hague of the East), mainly because a number of rich former sugar barons or planters from the Indies settled there, as they did in The Hague. Even now the city is famous for its parks and greenery. The urbanization in the north on hilly terrain is also quite unusual for the Netherlands.

=== 20th century ===
==== World War II ====
During the German occupation (World War II), the occupiers operated a subcamp of the Herzogenbusch concentration camp in the city.

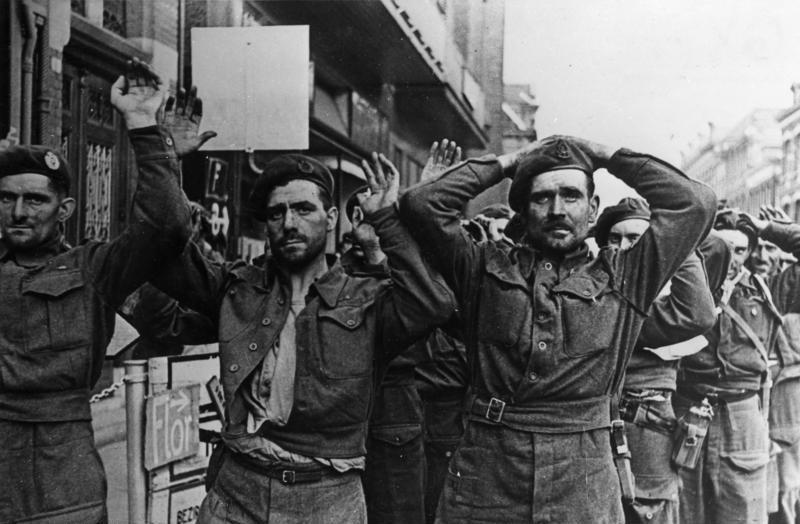
British soldiers captured at the Battle of Arnhem

During Operation Market Garden (September 1944), the British 1st Airborne Division, under the command of Major-General Roy Urquhart, and the Polish 1st Independent Parachute Brigade were given the task of securing the bridge at Arnhem.

Glider infantry and paratrooper units were landed into the area on 17 September and later. The bulk of the force was dropped rather far from the bridge and never met their objective. A small element of the British 1st Airborne, the 2nd Parachute Battalion under Lieutenant Colonel John D. Frost, managed to make its way as far as the bridge but was unable to secure both sides. The British troops encountered stiff resistance from the German 9th and 10th SS Panzer Divisions, which had been stationed in and around the city.

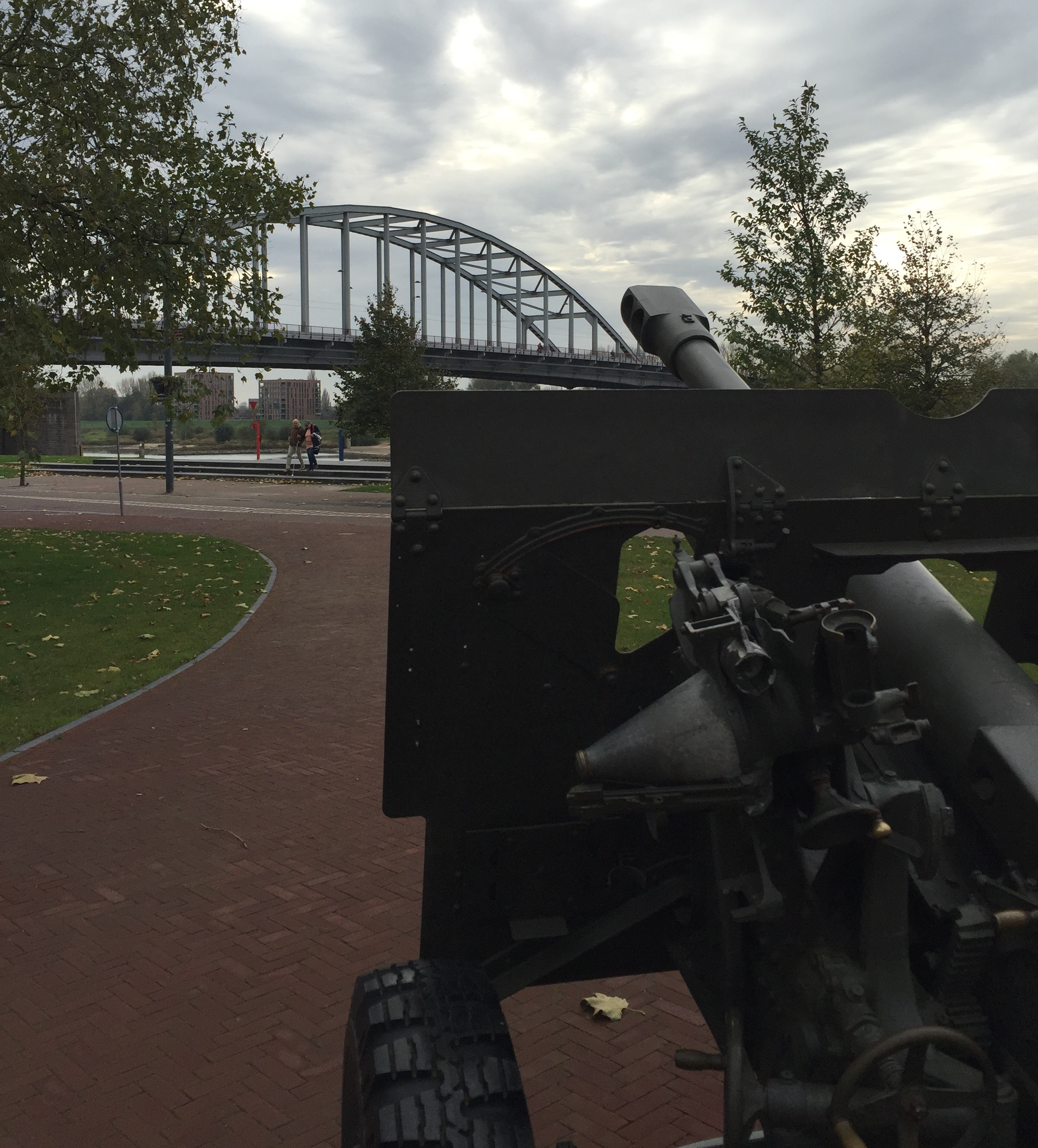
The John Frost Bridge, seen from the Airborne memorial

The British force at the bridge eventually ran out of ammunition and was captured on 21 September, and a full withdrawal of the remaining forces was made on 26 September. These events were dramatized in the 1977 movie A Bridge Too Far. (The bridge scenes in the movie were shot in Deventer, where a similar bridge over the IJssel was available, as the area around Arnhem bridge had changed too much to represent WWII-era Arnhem.) As a tribute, the rebuilt bridge was renamed 'John Frost Bridge' after the commander of the paratroopers. The official commemoration is 17 September.

The current bridge is the third almost-identical bridge built at the same spot. The Dutch Army destroyed the first bridge when the German Army invaded the Netherlands in 1940. The second bridge was destroyed by the United States Army Air Forces shortly after the 1944 battle.

A second battle of Arnhem took place in April 1945 when the city was liberated by the British 49th (West Riding) Infantry Division fighting as part of the First Canadian Army. The inhabitants of the city, who had been forcibly evacuated by the Germans during and after the battle, returned in the summer of 1945. The reconstruction of Arnhem took until 1969 to finally be completed.

Just outside Arnhem, in the town of Oosterbeek the Commonwealth War Graves Commission built the Arnhem Oosterbeek War Cemetery which contains the graves of most of those killed during the September landings, and many of those killed in later fighting in the area.

==== 1945–1999 ====
Arnhem hosted the 1980 Summer Paralympics.

=== 21st century ===
On 6 March 2025, a major city fire broke out in Arnhem. The fire destroyed a block of shops and upstairs apartments in the historic city center.

On 6 June & 8 June 2026, Ye (Kanye West) hosted two major concerts at GelreDome, as a part of his Ye Live Concert Tour

== Geography ==
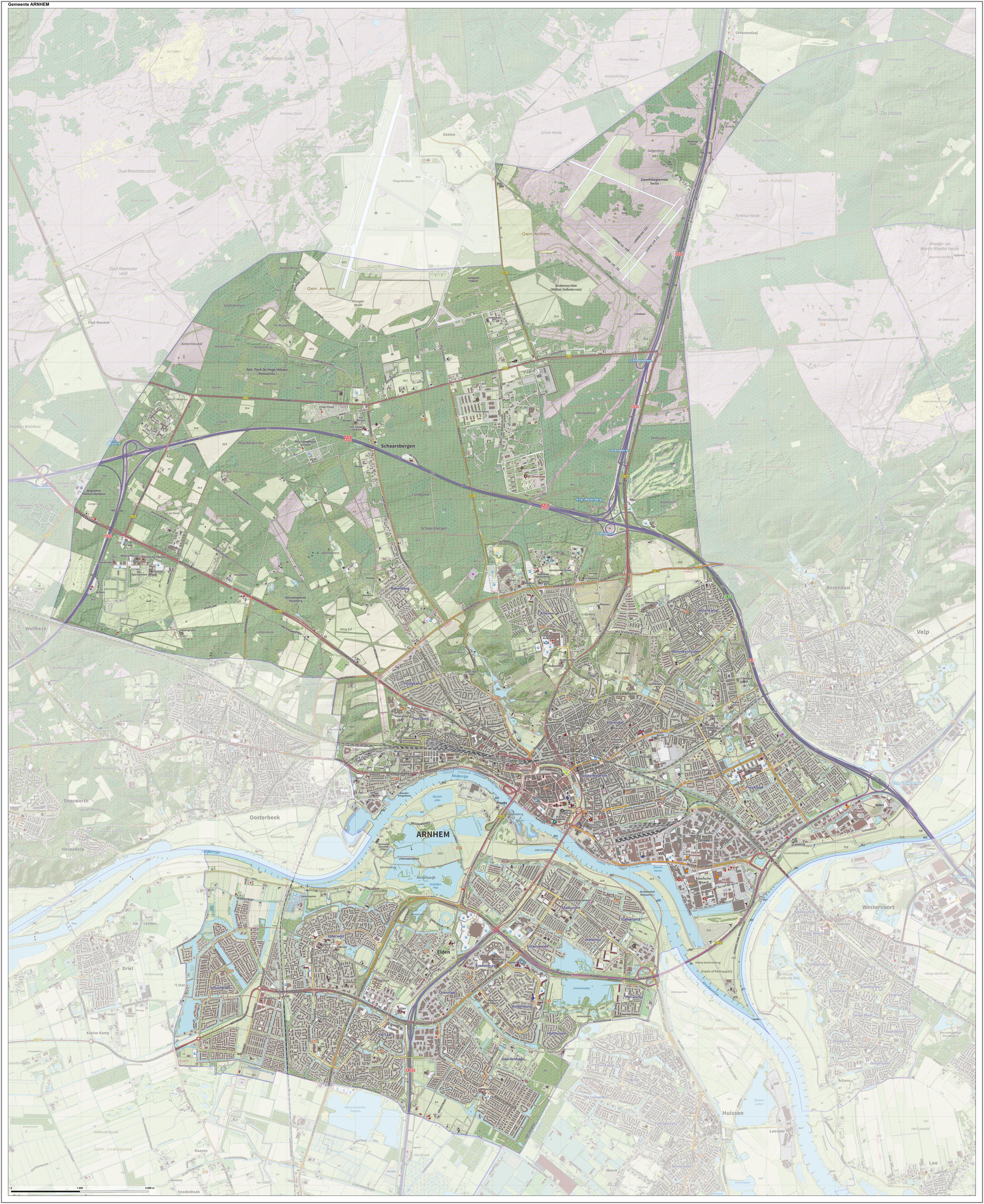
Topographic map of Arnhem.

=== Neighbourhoods ===
The municipality of Arnhem consists of the city of Arnhem and the following surrounding suburbs and former villages:

- Elden, Netherlands (former village, now totally surrounded by other Arnhem neighbourhoods)
- Schaarsbergen

Arnhem consists of three districts (stadsdelen) and 24 neighbourhoods (wijken). Each neighbourhood has a number which corresponds to its postal code.

1. Arnhem Centrum (Binnenstad)
2. Arnhem-North (Spijkerkwartier, Arnhemse Broek, Presikhaaf-West, Presikhaaf-East, St. Marten/Sonsbeek-Zuid, Klarendal, Velperweg, Alteveer en Cranevelt, Geitenkamp, Monnikenhuizen, Burgemeesterswijk/Hoogkamp, Heijenoord/Lombok, Klingelbeek)
3. Arnhem-South (Malburgen-West, Malburgen-East (North), Malburgen-East (South), De Laar East/West, Vredenburg/Kronenburg, Elderveld, Rijkerswoerd, Schuytgraaf)

=== Neighbouring villages ===
The outlying areas of the following villages are bordering the municipality of Arnhem directly, which means among others that in many a case a considerable number of their inhabitants originate from Arnhem.

- Velp
- Oosterbeek
- Driel
- Elst
- Huissen
- Wolfheze
- Rozendaal
- Westervoort

=== Proximity of border with Germany ===
The city lies approximately 15 kilometers from the border with Germany, and to some extent the westernmost villages in the municipality of Elten, Germany, function as dormitories for people who work in the Dutch city of Arnhem in part due to the immigration of Dutch people from the region that were attracted by the lower house pricing just across the border.

=== Climate ===
Arnhem features the same climate (Cfb, oceanic climate) as all of the Netherlands; however, its location on the foothills of the Veluwe, the largest forest in the Netherlands, contributes to some higher precipitation values.

Climate data for Deelen, Arnhem (1991−2020 normals, extremes 1953−present)
| Month | Jan | Feb | Mar | Apr | May | Jun | Jul | Aug | Sep | Oct | Nov | Dec | Year |
|---|---|---|---|---|---|---|---|---|---|---|---|---|---|
| Record high °C (°F) | 15.9 (60.6) | 19.5 (67.1) | 24.6 (76.3) | 29.4 (84.9) | 32.9 (91.2) | 37.9 (100.2) | 39.2 (102.6) | 37.2 (99.0) | 32.7 (90.9) | 26.4 (79.5) | 19.5 (67.1) | 16.0 (60.8) | 39.2 (102.6) |
| Mean daily maximum °C (°F) | 5.4 (41.7) | 6.5 (43.7) | 10.3 (50.5) | 14.9 (58.8) | 18.6 (65.5) | 21.3 (70.3) | 23.4 (74.1) | 23.0 (73.4) | 19.4 (66.9) | 14.5 (58.1) | 9.3 (48.7) | 6.0 (42.8) | 14.4 (57.9) |
| Daily mean °C (°F) | 2.9 (37.2) | 3.2 (37.8) | 5.9 (42.6) | 9.6 (49.3) | 13.3 (55.9) | 16.1 (61.0) | 18.1 (64.6) | 17.7 (63.9) | 14.5 (58.1) | 10.5 (50.9) | 6.4 (43.5) | 3.5 (38.3) | 10.1 (50.2) |
| Mean daily minimum °C (°F) | 0.0 (32.0) | -0.0 (32.0) | 1.6 (34.9) | 3.8 (38.8) | 7.5 (45.5) | 10.4 (50.7) | 12.6 (54.7) | 12.3 (54.1) | 9.8 (49.6) | 6.6 (43.9) | 3.3 (37.9) | 0.9 (33.6) | 5.7 (42.3) |
| Record low °C (°F) | −24.2 (−11.6) | −23.2 (−9.8) | −17.0 (1.4) | −9.4 (15.1) | −4.5 (23.9) | −0.9 (30.4) | 2.0 (35.6) | 2.4 (36.3) | −0.9 (30.4) | −6.5 (20.3) | −9.9 (14.2) | −18.4 (−1.1) | −24.2 (−11.6) |
| Average precipitation mm (inches) | 79.5 (3.13) | 63.7 (2.51) | 60.7 (2.39) | 43.8 (1.72) | 62.9 (2.48) | 69.1 (2.72) | 86.5 (3.41) | 83.9 (3.30) | 73.8 (2.91) | 73.3 (2.89) | 79.5 (3.13) | 91.3 (3.59) | 868.0 (34.17) |
| Average relative humidity (%) | 88.8 | 85.5 | 80.0 | 72.8 | 72.5 | 74.5 | 75.7 | 77.5 | 82.5 | 86.6 | 90.9 | 90.8 | 81.5 |
| Mean monthly sunshine hours | 62.7 | 86.7 | 135.8 | 181.6 | 205.1 | 196.2 | 203.2 | 188.3 | 148.7 | 115.9 | 66.7 | 53.5 | 1,644.4 |
| Percentage possible sunshine | 24.2 | 30.8 | 36.8 | 43.6 | 42.2 | 39.3 | 40.4 | 41.4 | 39.0 | 35.0 | 25.0 | 22.0 | 35.0 |
Source: Royal Netherlands Meteorological Institute

== Demographics ==
=== Inhabitants by nationality ===
Arnhem residents by ethnic background (1 January 2023)
| Country | 2023 |
|---|---|
| Netherlands | 64.2% |
| European Union | 8.9% |
| Turkey | 5.2% |
| Indonesia | 3.4% |
| Morocco | 2.4% |
| Suriname | 2.1% |
| (Netherlands) Dutch Caribbean | 2.1% |
| Other non-western | 11.7% |

== Places of interest ==
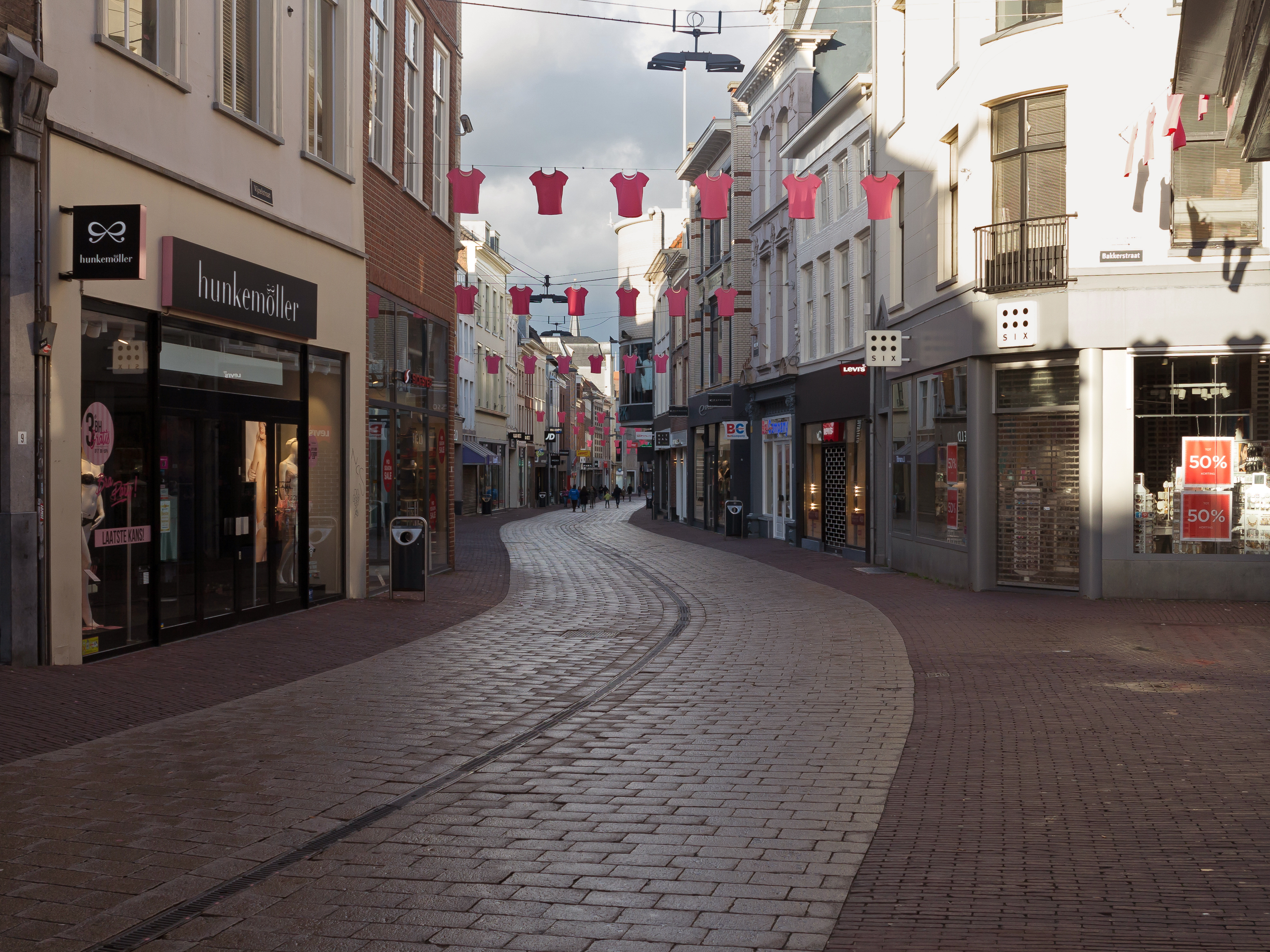
City centre

The Grote Kerk (St. Eusebius' Church), built 1452–1560, lost most of its tower during World War II, of which a part has been reconstructed to a modern design and opened in 1964. Officially the tower is not part of the church and is owned by the municipality.

The house of Maarten van Rossum, a general serving Duke Charles van Gelre, has been the town hall since 1830: The satyrs in its Renaissance ornamentation earned it the name Duivelshuis (devil's house). The Netherlands Open Air Museum is located outside the city. It includes antique houses, farms, factories, and windmills from different parts of the Netherlands. Two other windmills stand in Arnhem itself, De Hoop and De Kroon.

The Royal Burgers' Zoo in Arnhem is one of the biggest zoos in the Netherlands, featuring an underwater walkthrough, desert, mangrove, and rainforest. The GelreDome, the home of Vitesse Arnhem, the city's Eredivisie team in football, is a facility that features a retractable roof and a slide-out grass pitch. The concept has been fully duplicated since then by the Veltins-Arena in Gelsenkirchen, Germany, and State Farm Stadium in Glendale, Arizona, U.S., and partially by the Sapporo Dome in Japan (which has a sliding pitch but a fixed roof).

The KEMA Toren (formerly known as SEP Control Tower) is the highest structure of the town. It is a 140-m-high TV tower.

=== Parks ===
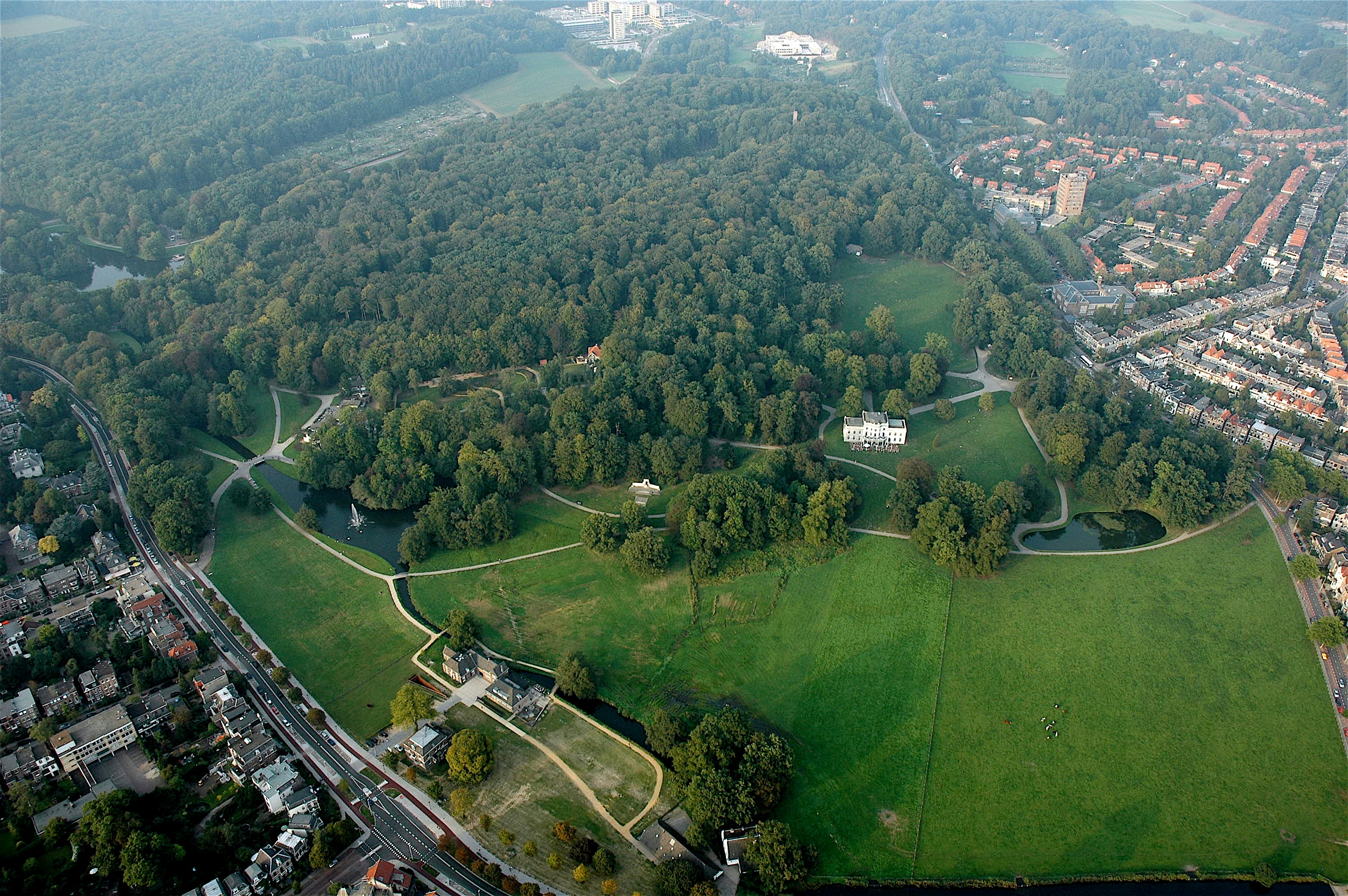
Sonsbeek Park (Urban park)

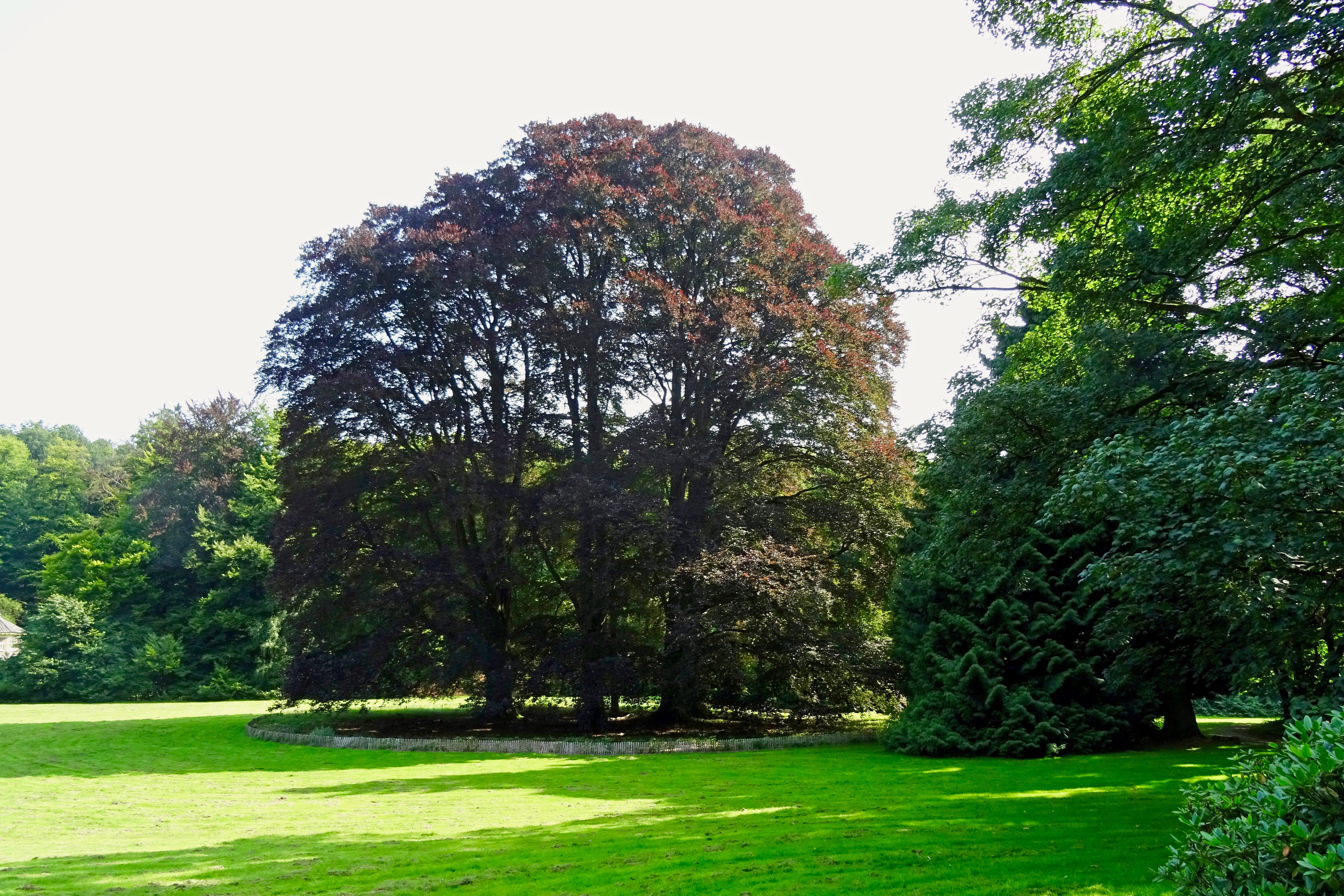
Zypendaal Park

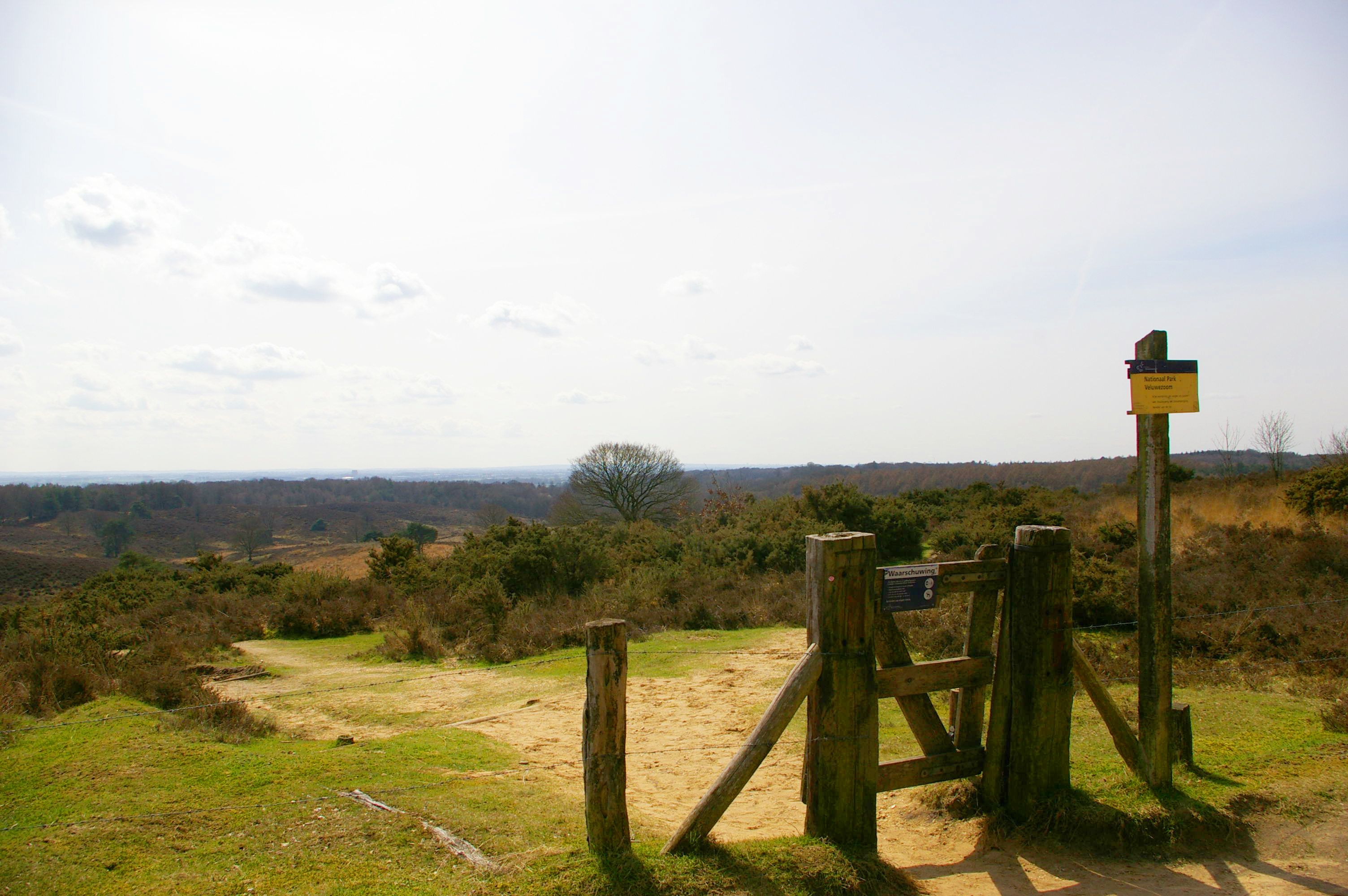
Veluwezoom National Park

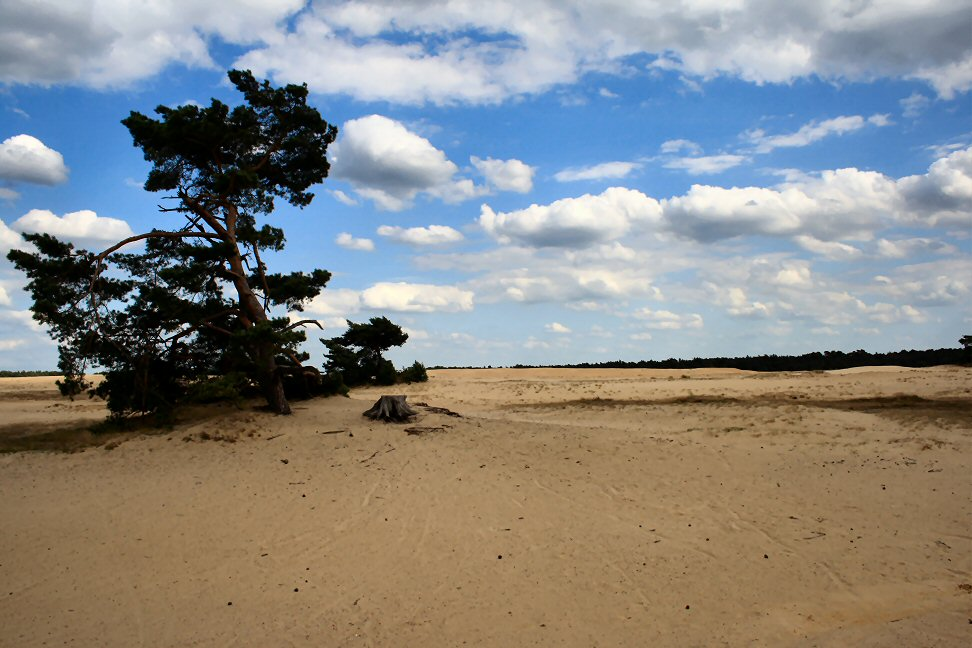
Hoge Veluwe National Park

=== Museums in and around Arnhem ===
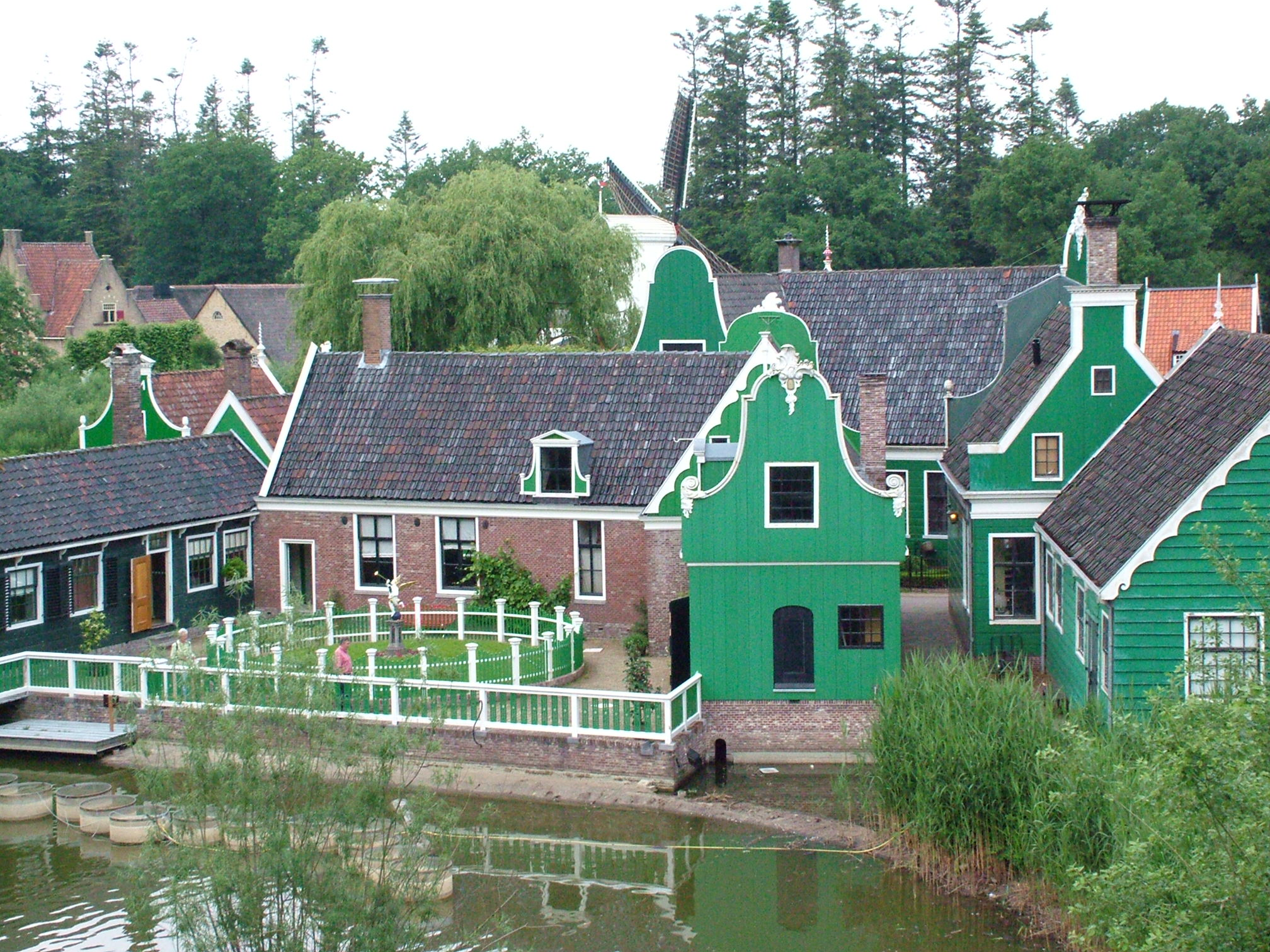
Netherlands Open Air Museum

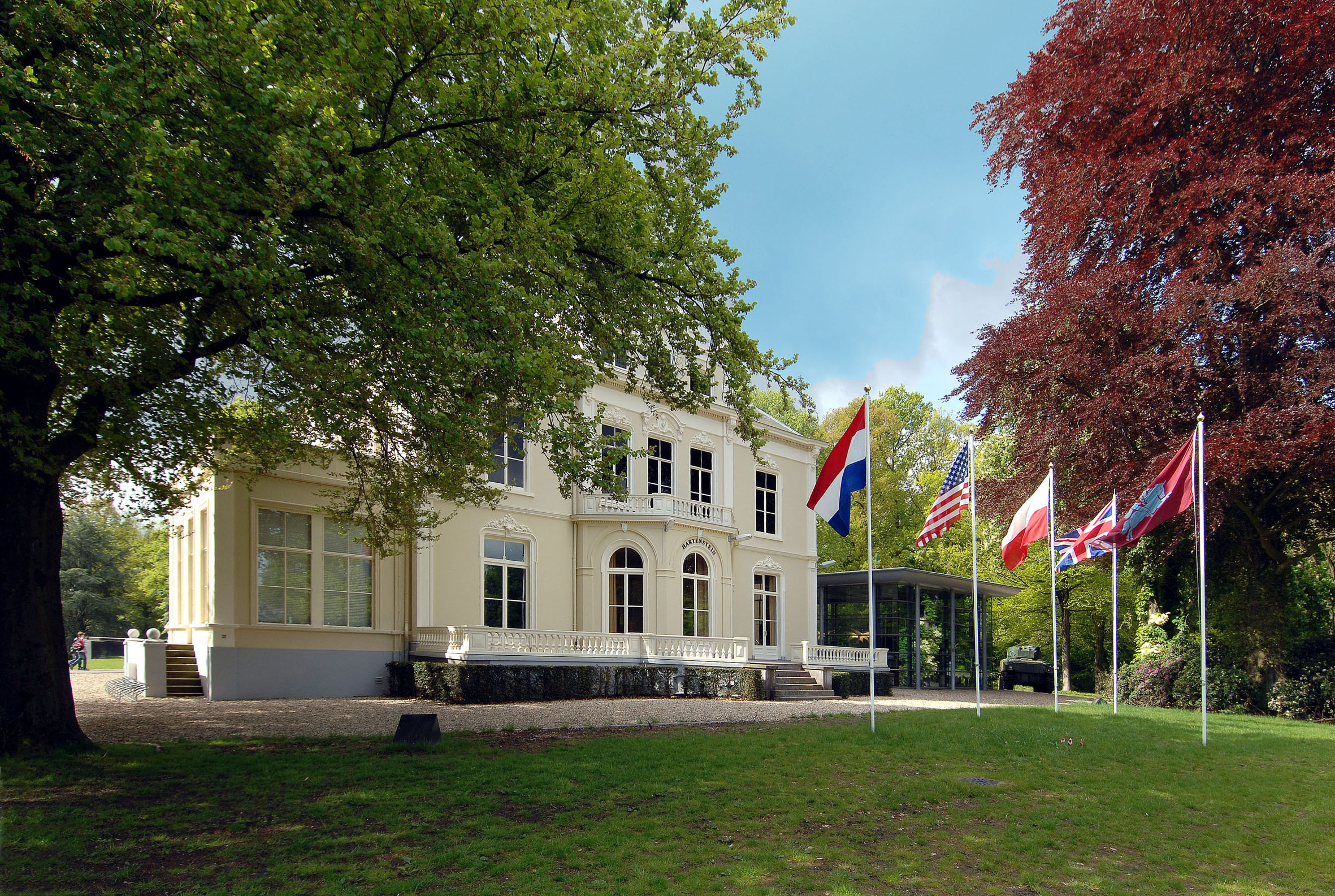
Airborne Museum 'Hartenstein'

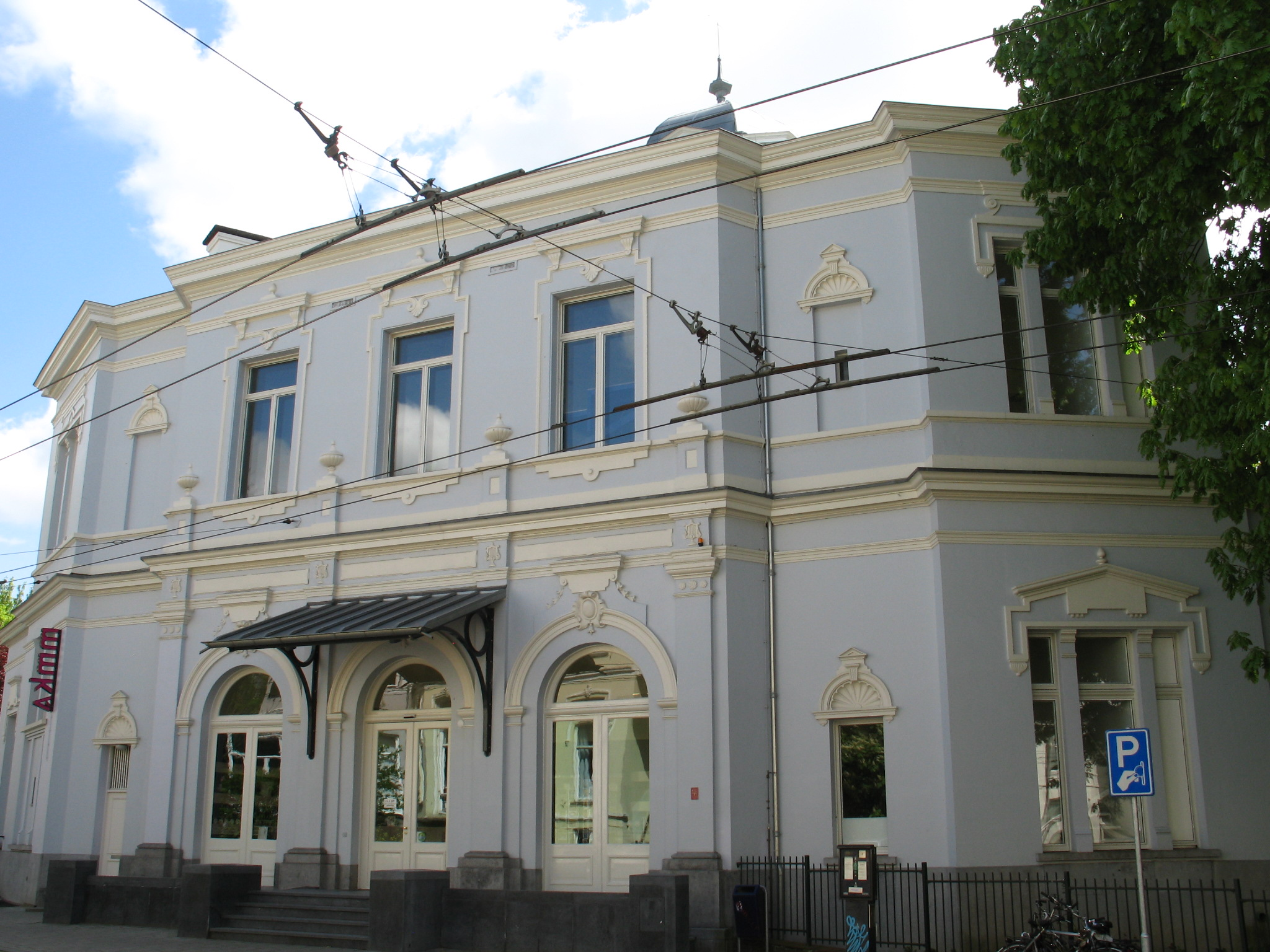
Gemeentemuseum

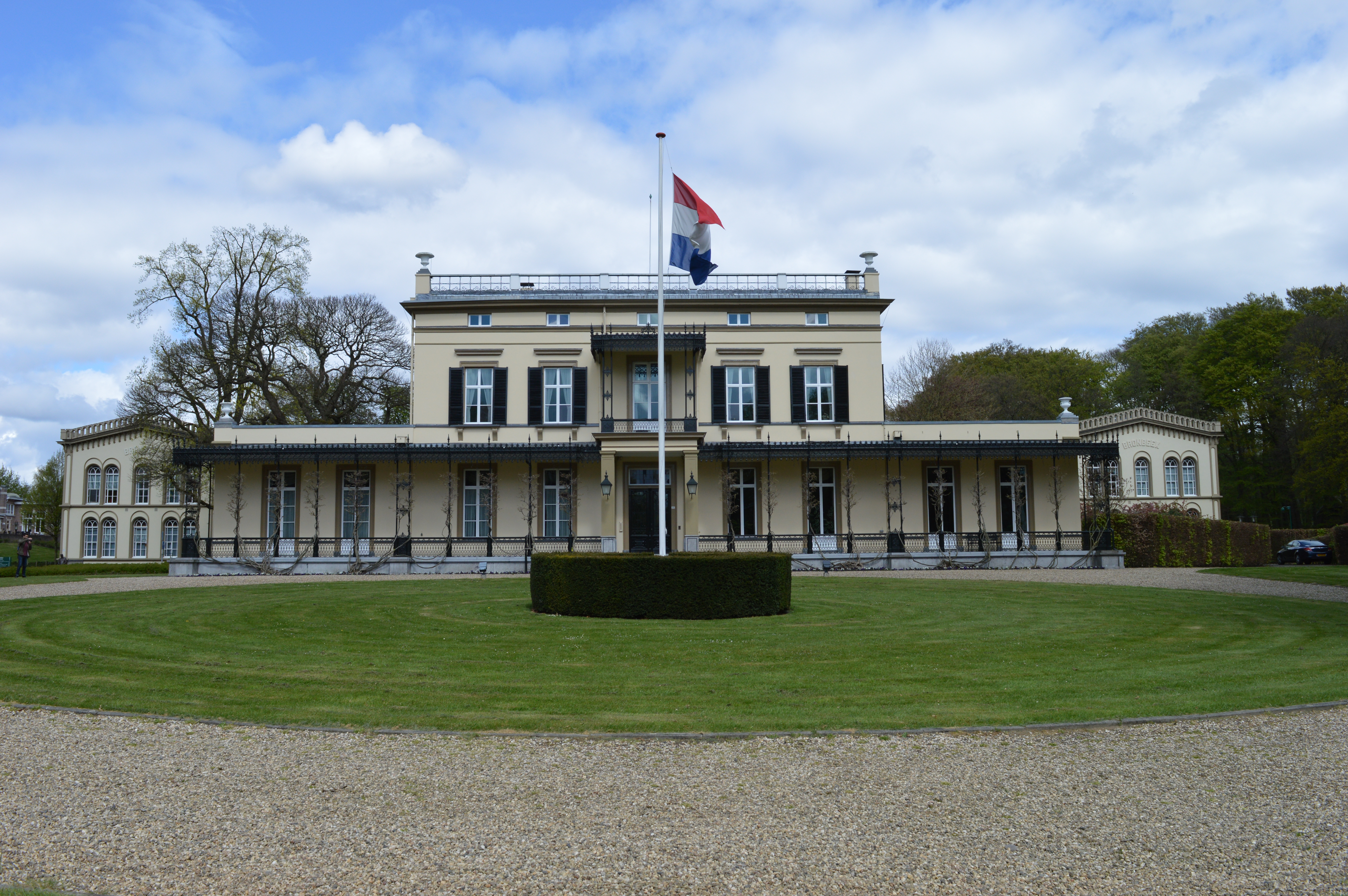
Museum Bronbeek

=== Buildings and locations ===
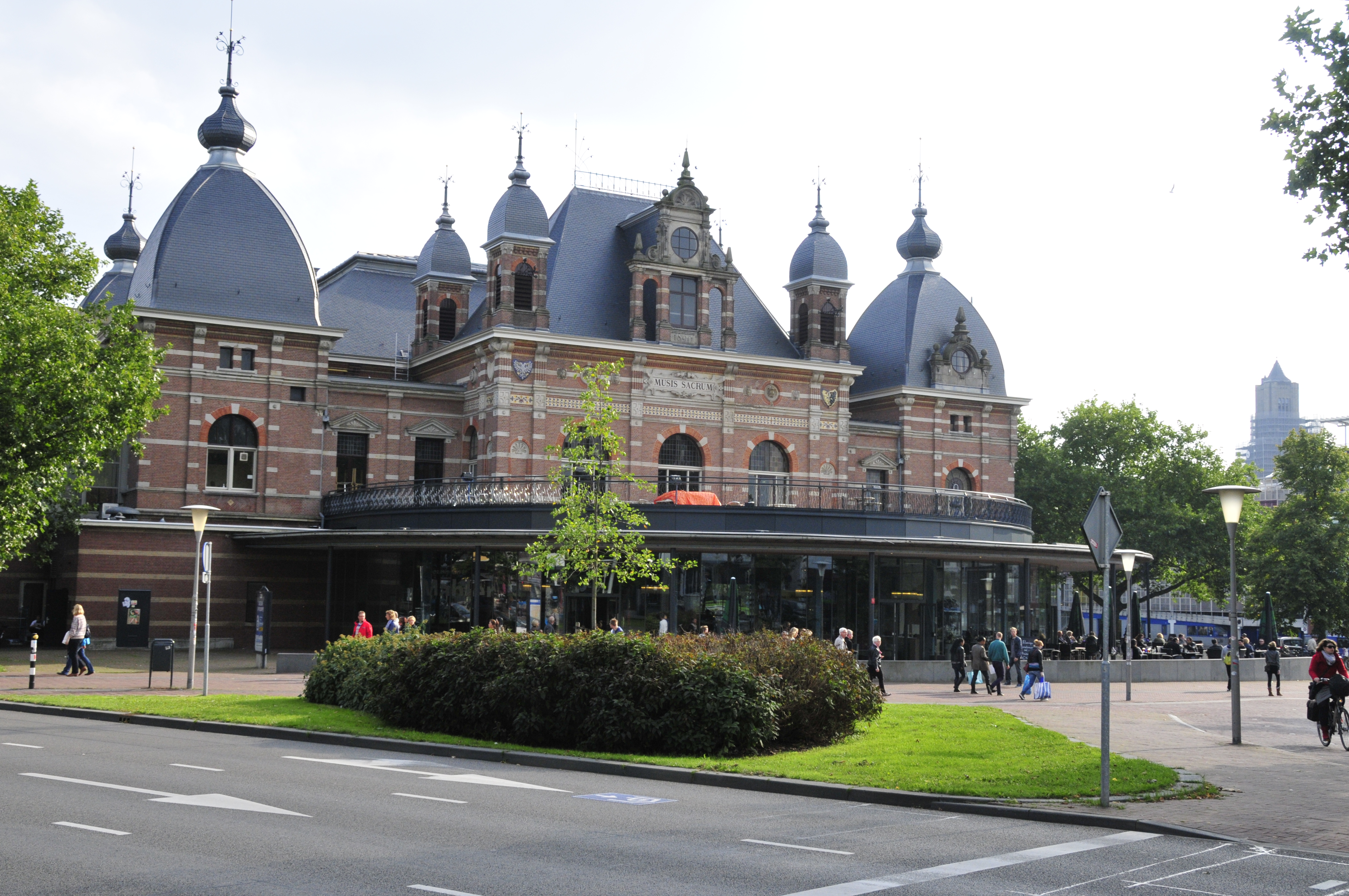
Musis Sacrum

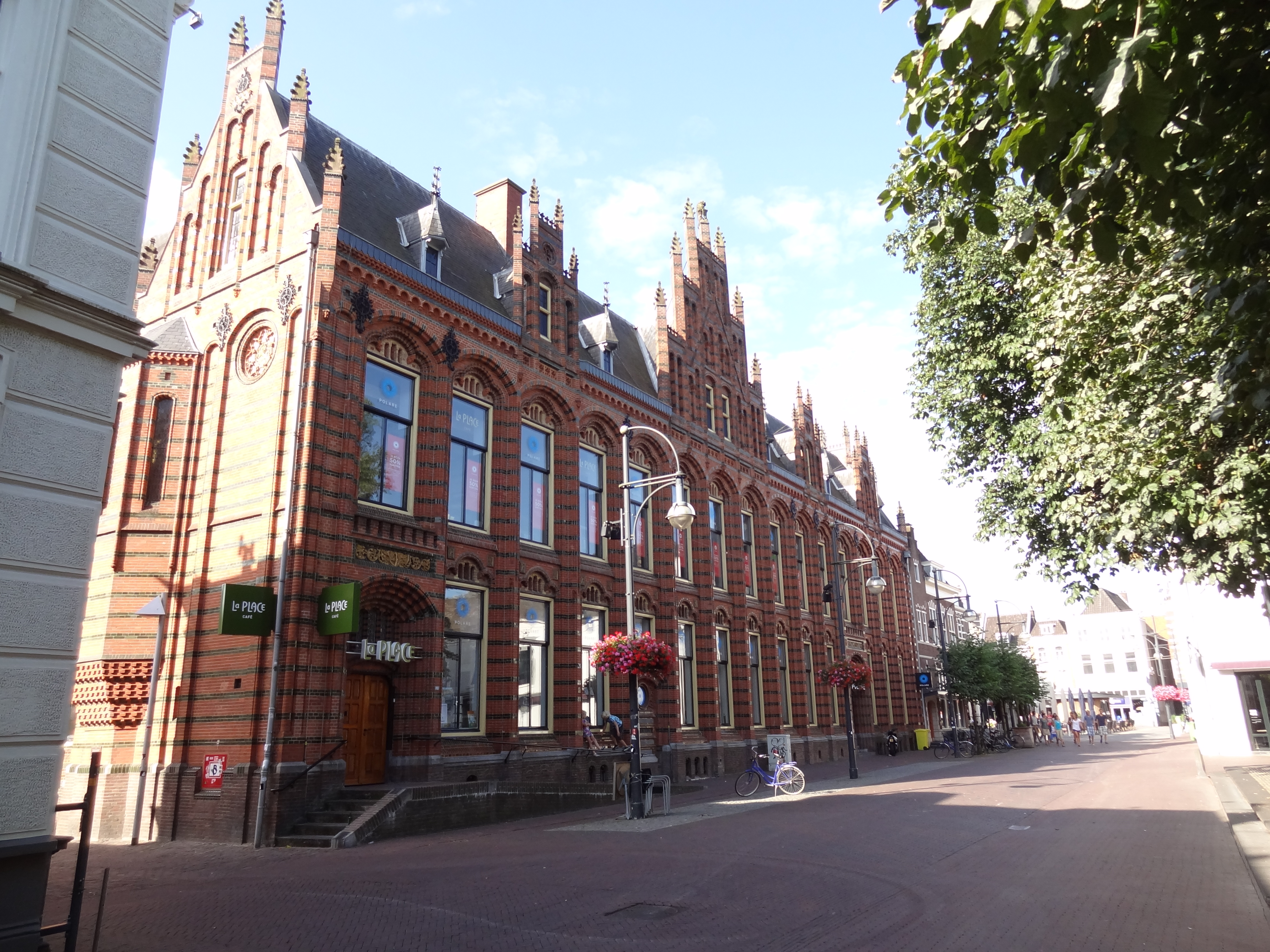
Arnhem Centrum

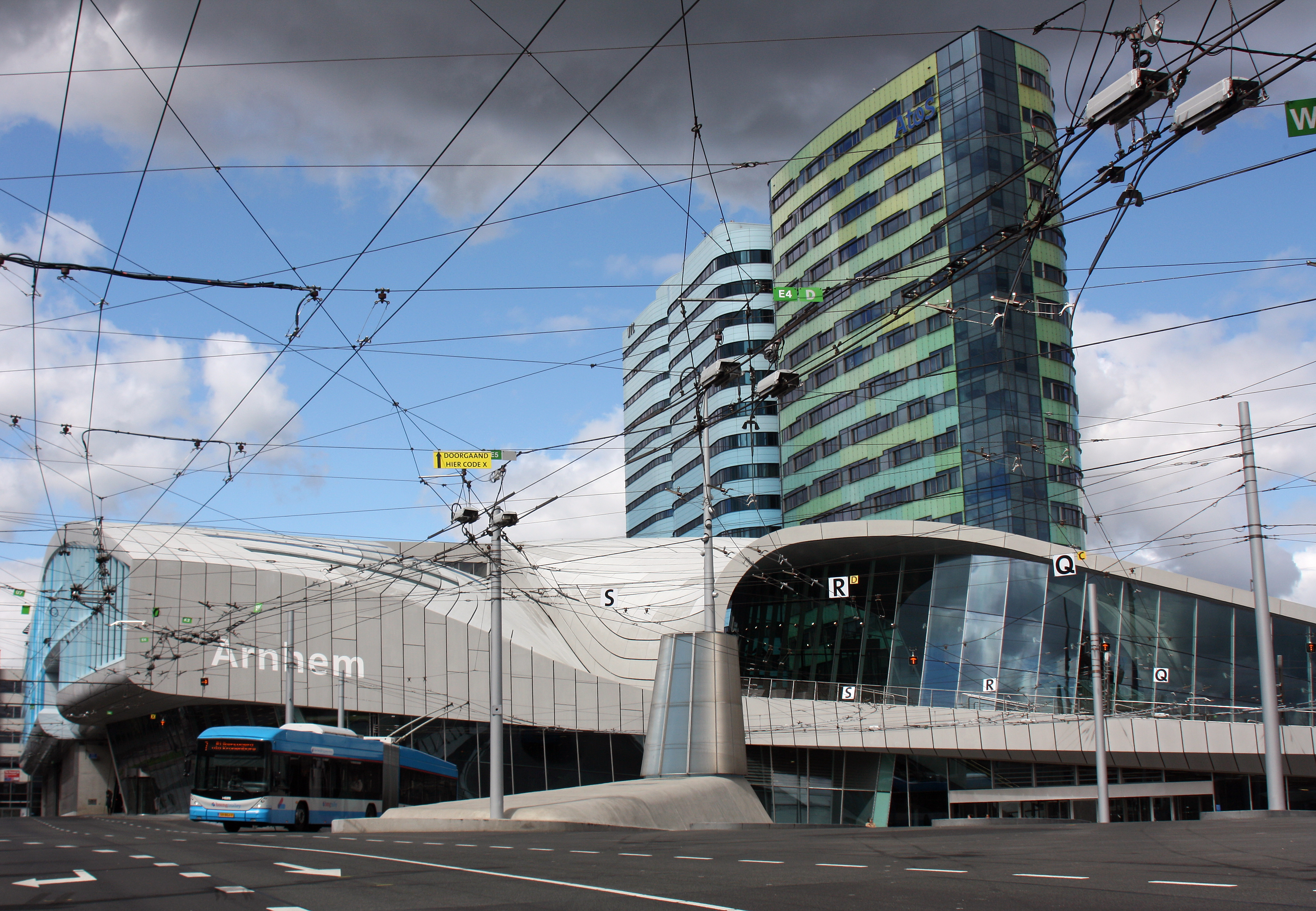
Central Station

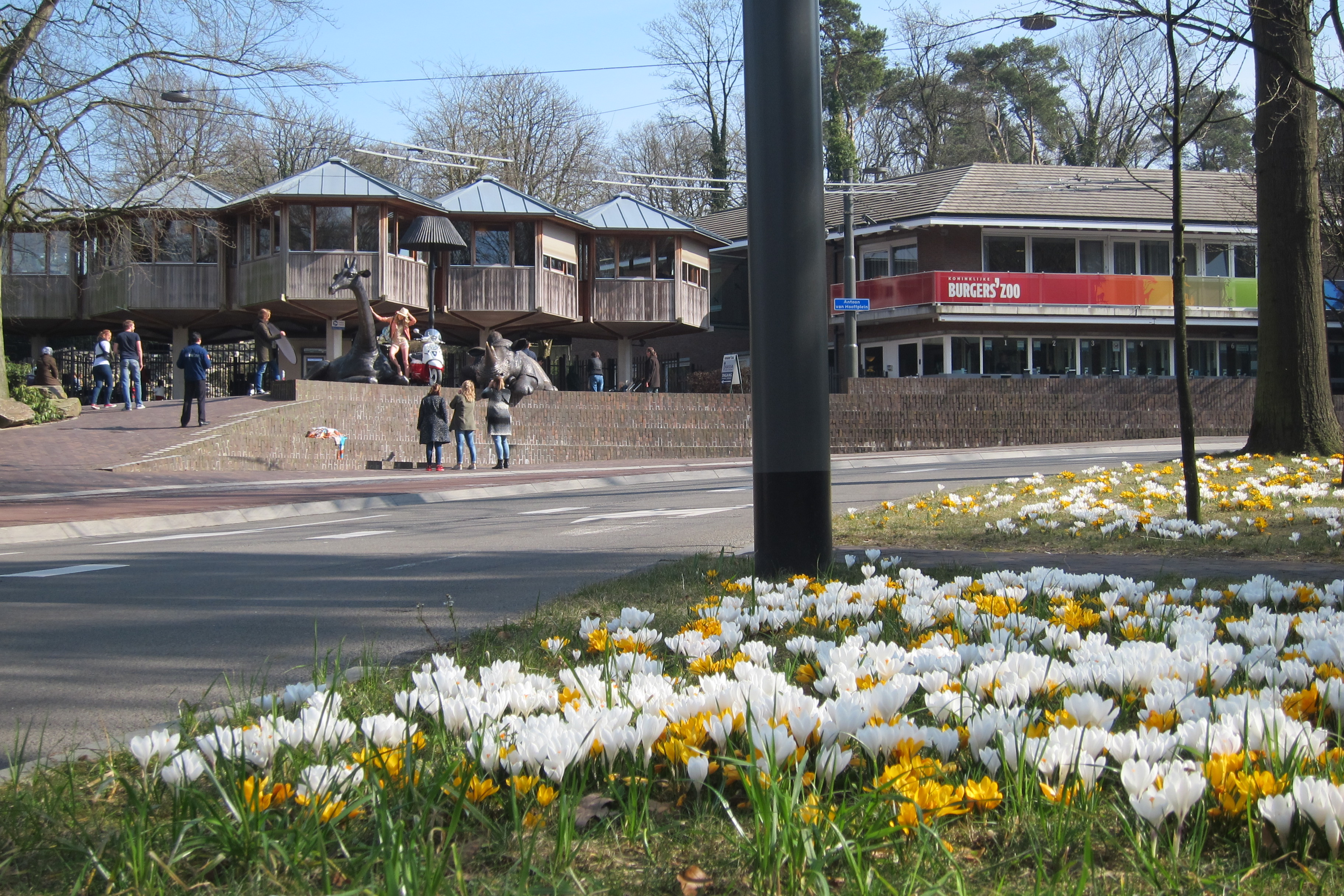
Burgers Zoo

== Events ==
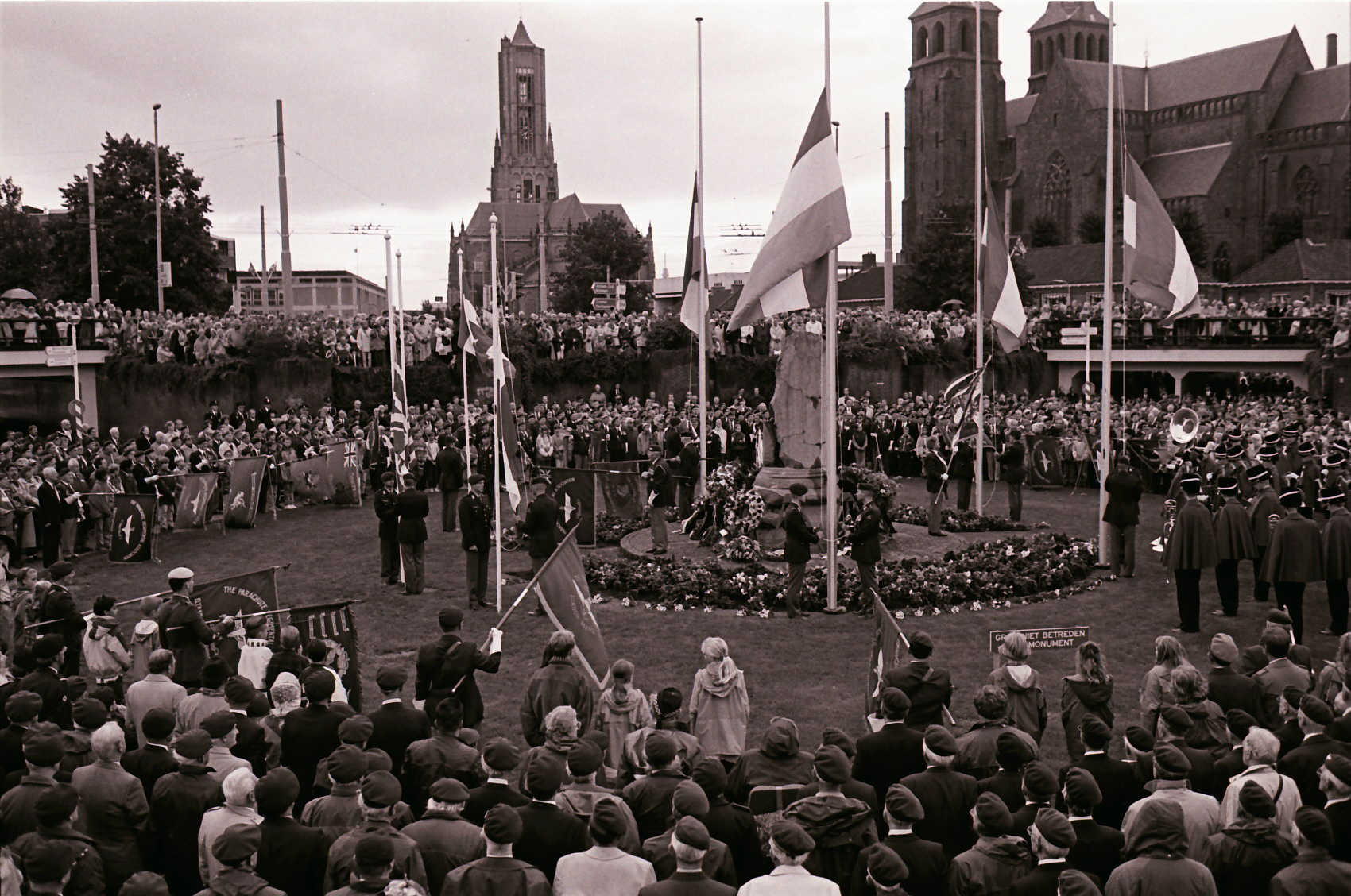
Airborne Commemoration (1994)

- Airborne Commemoration (annual, 17–26 September) commemorates the Battle of Arnhem
- World Statues Festival (September or October pre-pandemic) living statue competition and street performance festival
- Sonsbeek Theater Avenue (annual, mid-August) outdoor performing arts festival with theater, circus, dance, music, cabaret, and food
- Free Your Mind Festival (annual, early June) Electronic dance music festival, especially techno and house, at Stadsblokken
- Dancetour (summer) outdoor electronic dance music event with DJs and live entertainment
- 8Bahn (varies) electronic music
- De Rabo Bridge to Bridge (annual, September) marathon, running, and endurance events
- UITboulevard (late summer) cultural festival: theater, music, dance, other performing arts
- Sprookjesfestival (annual, October) arts and culture festival centered around fairy tales and other storytelling activities
- King's Day (27 April) Birthday of King Willem-Alexander, celebrated with street markets, outdoor parties, music, and family activities
- Sinterklaas (annual, mid-November) Sinterklaas arrives by boat; festivities continue into early December
- Hoogte80 (annual, Ascension weekend) theater/art/music festival in the Geitenkamp neighborhood
- ASM Festival (annual, May) Outdoor music festival in Stadsblokken with live music and DJs

== Sport ==
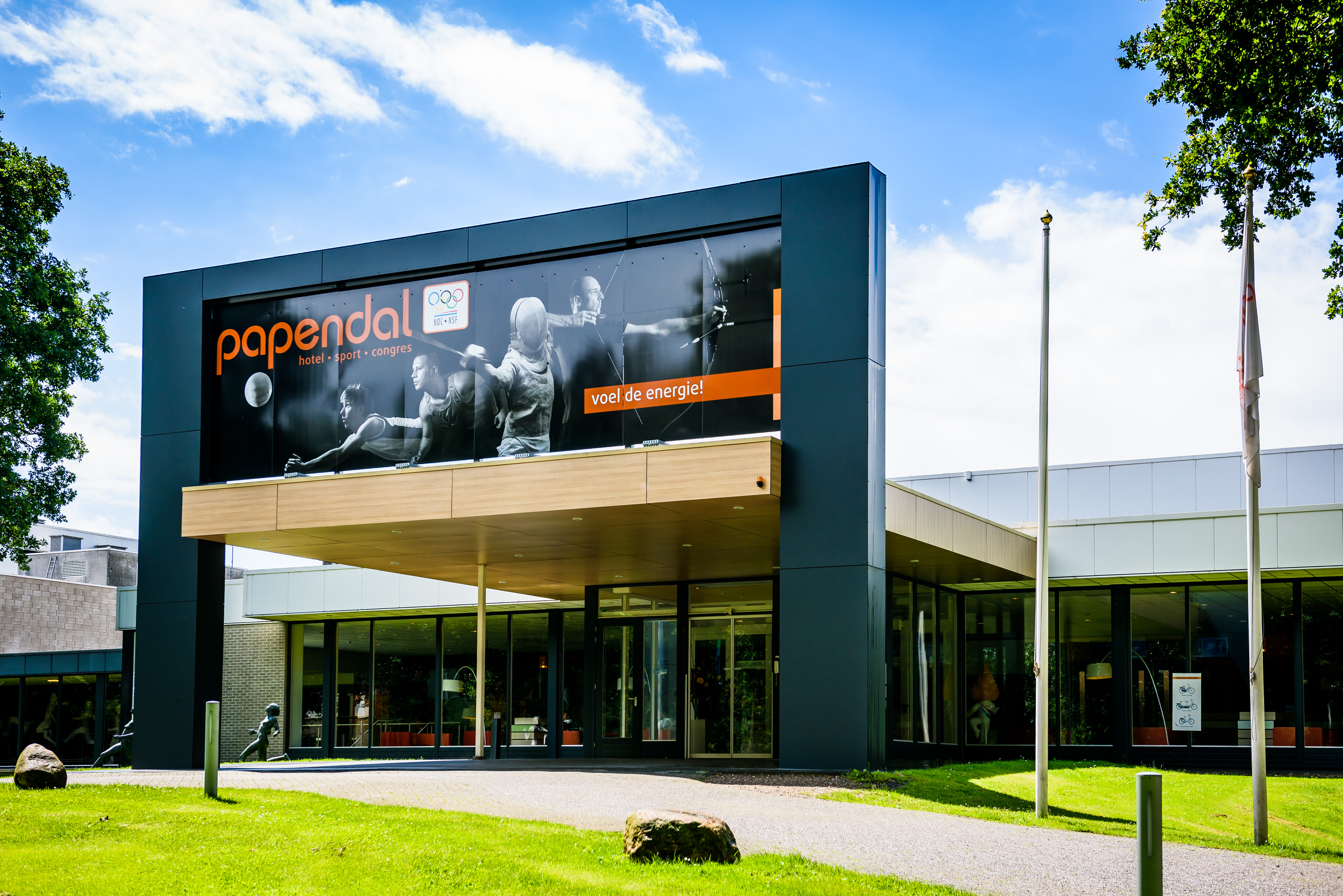
National Sports Centre Papendal

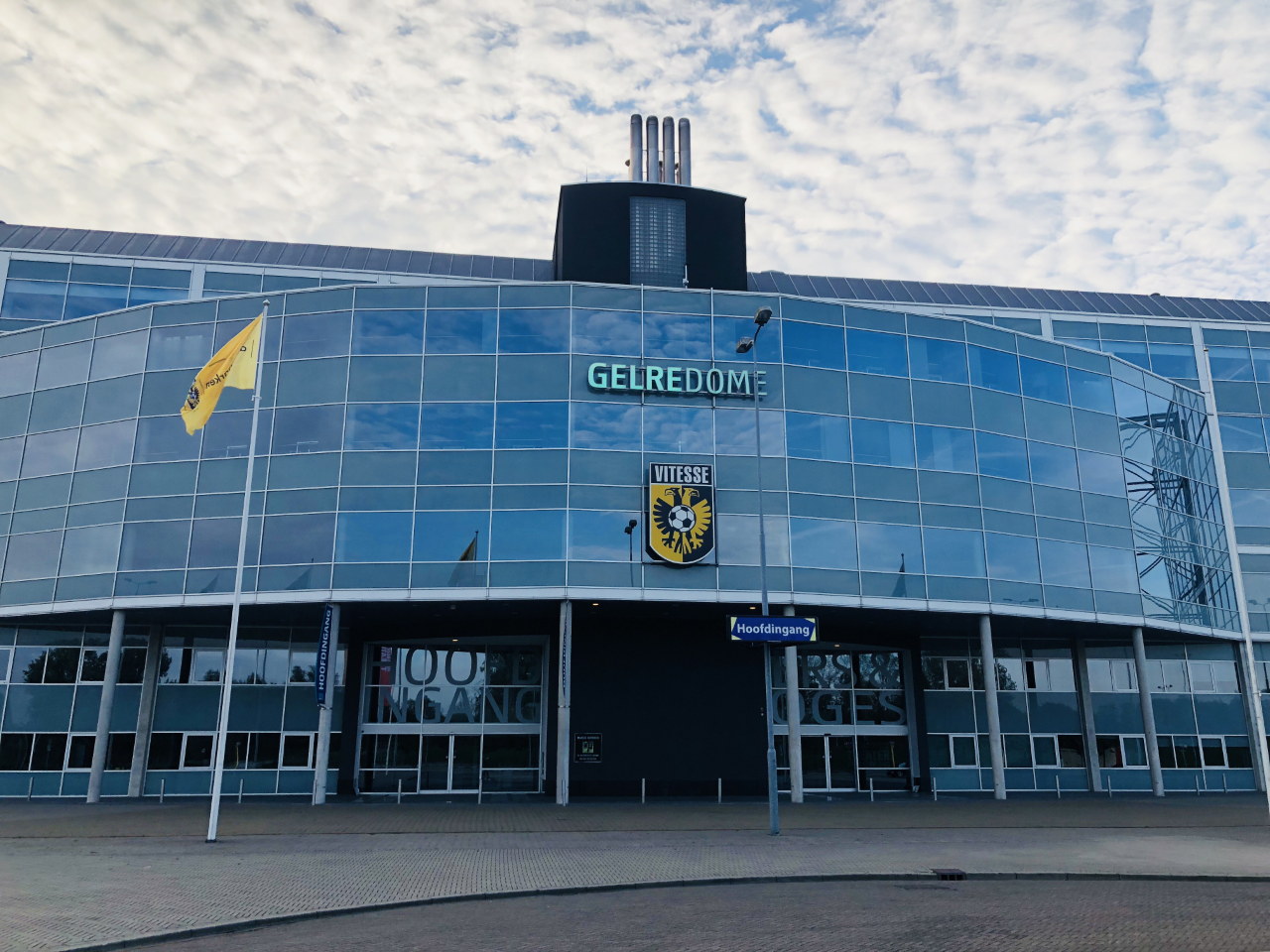
GelreDome Stadium

The National Sports Centre Papendal is the national sports development centre of the Netherlands, located in Arnhem. The first event held at Papendal was the 1980 Summer Paralympics, from 21 June to 5 July. However the site was formally adopted and developed from 1993, after the merger of the Dutch National Olympic Committee (NOC) and the Nederlandse Sport Federatie (NSF).

NOC*NSF have 90 affiliated national sports organizations, representing about 2700 individual sports clubs. Papendal is also the training location of football club Vitesse Arnhem, and the club's youth development system. Supporting facilities include a conference centre and hotel.

In preparation for the 2012 Summer Olympics, in 2011 the facility built a replica of the proposed BMX racing track at the London Velopark venue. The track will host the second event on the 2011 UCI BMX World Championships, on 27 and 28 May 2011.

Since January 2013 Sports Centre Papendal officially split from NOC * NSF and thus as organization demerges. This split offers Sports Centre Papendal many commercial benefits. There are facilities for various sports, including athletics, cycling and more.

Sport in the city is principally focussed on its association football club Vitesse Arnhem and its stadium the GelreDome built for the UEFA Euro 2000. The club has enjoyed some success in the Eredivisie and has featured in the UEFA Cup competition. Their best result in the Eredivisie was third place in 1997–98. The club won the KNVB Cup in 2016–17.

Introdans is a dance company based in the city of Arnhem. In 2009 the Ministry of Education, Culture and Science designated Introdans part of the basic national infrastructure. In 2016 was the Giro d'Italia in Arnhem.

== Transport ==
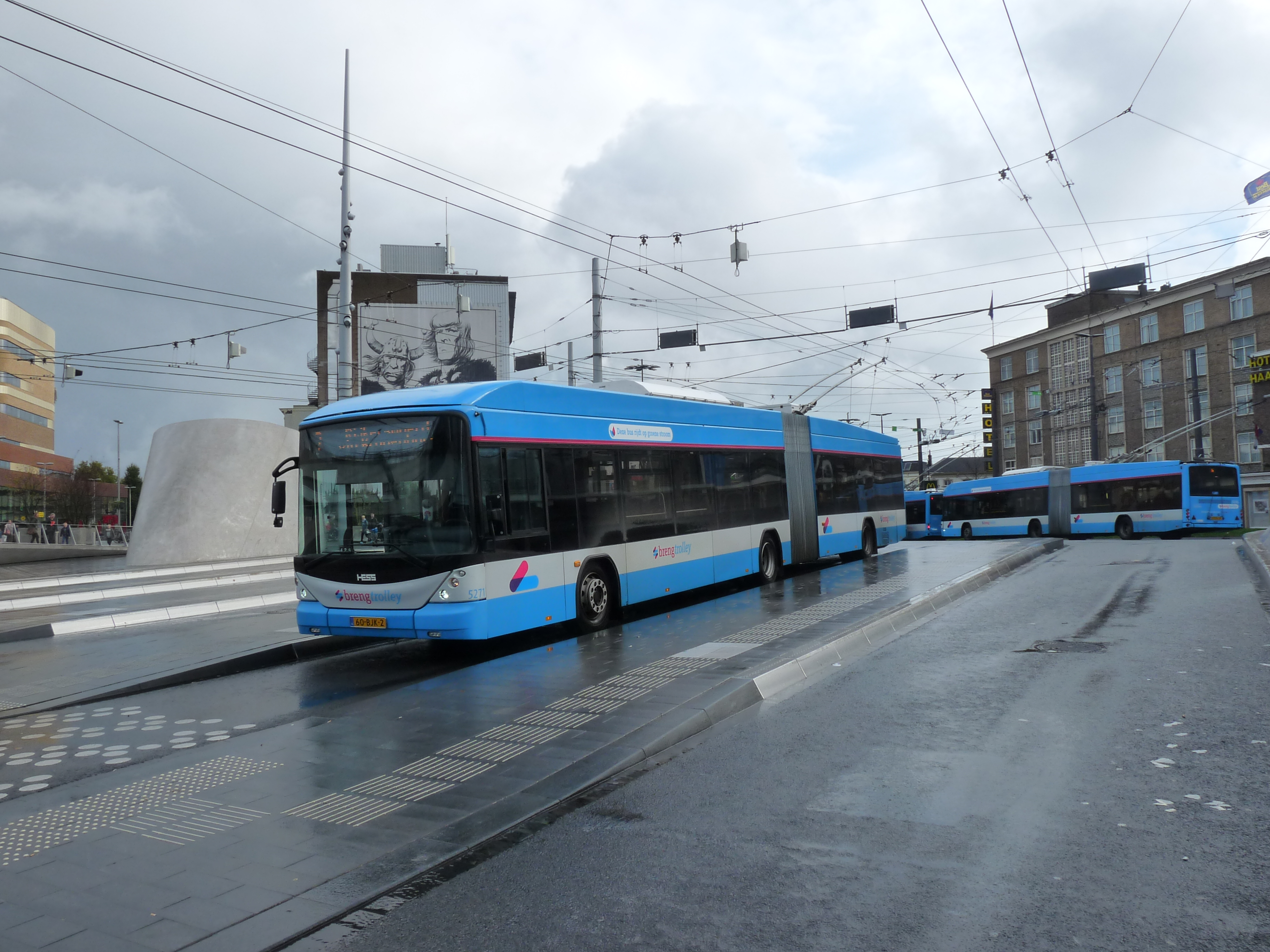
Trolleybus in Arnhem

Due to its central location in Eastern Netherlands, Arnhem is a hub for water, road, and rail traffic.

Arnhem is bikeable. The RijnWaalpad is a 17 km long bicycle highway and connects Arnhem with Nijmegen. It is the region's first fast-paced cycling route. In 2018 the second fast bike route was opened and Arnhem connects with Wageningen.

Arnhem has had a main central railway station since 1845 – Arnhem Centraal railway station, which is serviced by several intercity lines and the Intercity-Express to Düsseldorf and further on to Frankfurt.

Until 2016, there were also NS International trains to other destinations abroad, with some coaches going as far as Moscow.

The intercity lines provide direct connections to Utrecht, Nijmegen and Zutphen. It is also the terminus for several local railway services. Arnhem has three other stations, namely Arnhem Velperpoort (since 1953), Arnhem Presikhaaf (since 1969) and Arnhem Zuid (since 2005).

KLM operated a bus from the train station to Schiphol Airport for its customers until April 2025.

Arnhem is unique in the Netherlands with its trolleybus system.

== Notable people ==
- Karel Aalbers (1949), Business man and football club president
- Truus van Aalten (1910–1999), actress
- Afro Brothers (2016), electronic/urban DJ duo
- Blaudzun (1974), singer-songwriter
- Marion Bloem (1952), writer and film maker
- Hetty Blok (1920–2012), cabaret artist, singer, and actress
- Edmond Classen (1938–2014), actor
- Ien Dales (1931–1994), politician of the Labour Party (PvdA)
- Esmée Denters (1988), singer and YouTube celebrity
- Eva Duldig (1938), Austrian-born Australian and Dutch tennis player, author
- Willibrord Frequin (1941–2022), journalist and television presenter
- Henk Guth (1921–2002), artist
- Aarnoud van Heemstra (1871–1957), politician and maternal grandfather of Audrey Hepburn
- Jan van Hooff (1936), biologist
- Kenny van Hummel (1982), bicycle racer
- Rudolf Jansen (1940–2024), pianist
- Tania de Jong (1964), Dutch-born Australian soprano and entrepreneur; daughter of Eva Duldig
- Ferdi Kadıoğlu (1999), Dutch-born Turkish football player
- Antonie Kamerling (1966–2010), actor and musician
- Herman Koch (1953), writer and actor
- Hendrik Lorentz (1853–1928), physicist and Nobel Prize laureate
- Mark van der Maarel (1989), former Dutch football player
- William H. Machen (1832–1911), Dutch-born American artist
- Goos Meeuwsen (1982), circus artist
- Jonas Daniel Meijer (1780–1834), the first Jewish lawyer in the Netherlands
- Leo Peelen (1968–2017), track cyclist
- Estavana Polman (1992), handball player
- Eveline Saalberg (1998), track and field runner
- Joran van der Sloot (1987), convicted murderer
- Mart Smeets (1947), radio and television host, and writer
- Mike Starink (1970), television presenter and actor
- Saar de Swart (1861–1951), sculptor
- Rik Toonen (1954), water polo player, bronze medalist at the 1976 Summer Olympics
- Linda Wagenmakers (1975), singer and voice actress

== Facts and figures ==
- Arnhem is the name of a march composed by A.E. Kelly.
- Arnhem Land in Australia is named after the Dutch East India Company (VOC) ship Arnhem.
- Theirs is the Glory (also known as Men of Arnhem) is a 1946 British war film about the British 1st Airborne Division's involvement in the Battle of Arnhem (17 to 25 September 1944) during Operation Market Garden in the Second World War. Another film, A Bridge Too Far, tells the story of the failure of Operation Market Garden in Arnhem.

== Twin towns – sister cities ==
Arnhem is twinned with:

- Coventry, England, United Kingdom
- Croydon, England, United Kingdom
- Gera, Germany
- Hradec Králové, Czech Republic
- Kimberley, South Africa
- Villa El Salvador, Peru
- Airdrie, Scotland, United Kingdom

== See also ==
- Arnhem Metal Meeting
