= Sint-Jansbeek =

Stream in Arnhem, Netherlands

Coordinates: 51°59′54″N 5°53′42″E

The Sint-Jansbeek (Dutch pronunciation: [sɪɲˈtɕɑnzbeːk]) is a stream in Arnhem, which streams down from the hills of Zijpendaal through the Sonsbeek park and the inner city of Arnhem to the river Rhine. The Sint-Jansbeek has always been an open stream, but the part in the inner city is covered since the city moats were filled in the 19th century. The stream from the source in Zijpendaal through the park Sonsbeek is still open.
