= Jonas Daniel Meijer =

Dutch Jewish lawyer

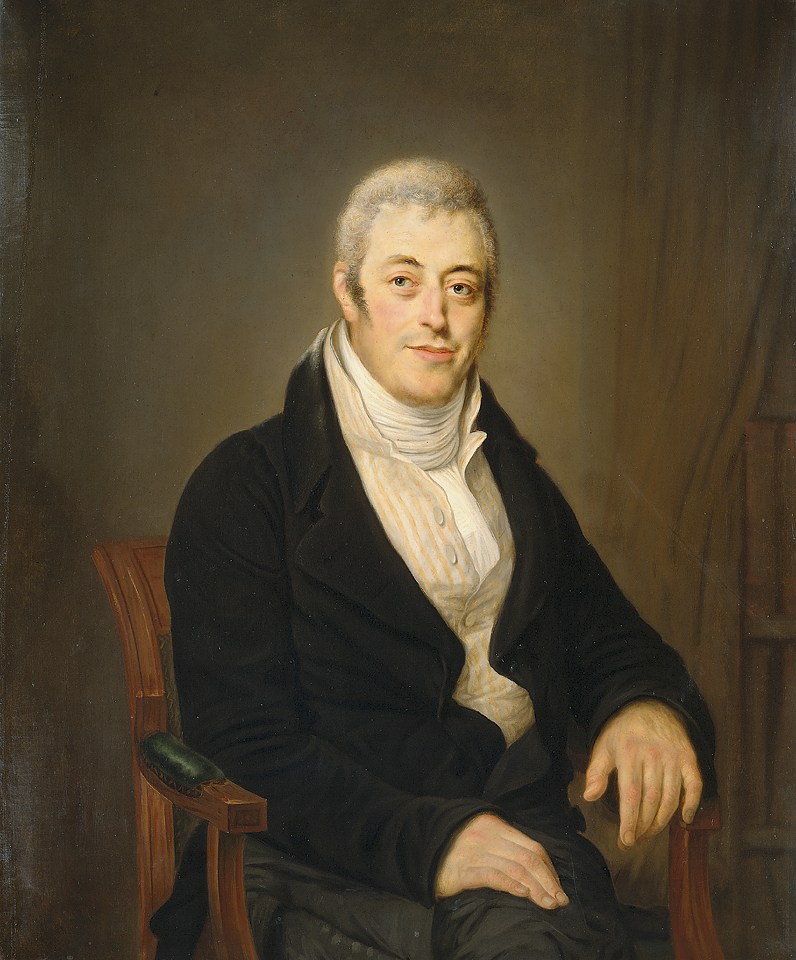
J.D. Meijer in 1830 by Louis Moritz, Rijksmuseum

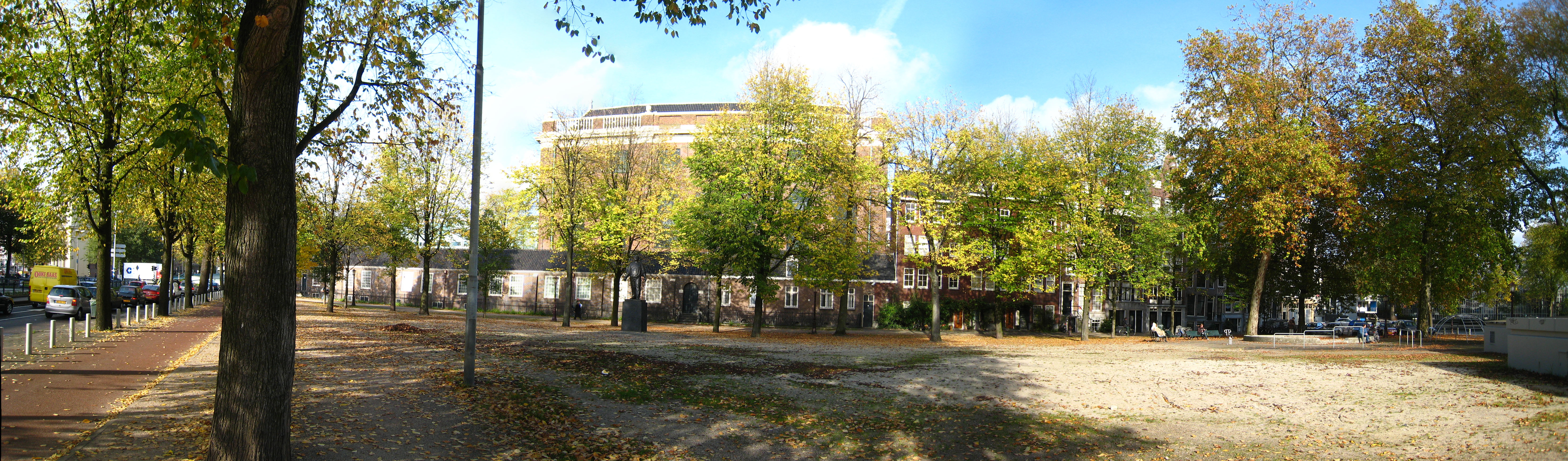
Jonas Daniël Meijerplein in Amsterdam

Jonas Daniel Meijer (Arnhem, 15 September 1780 – Amsterdam, 6 December 1834) was the first Jewish lawyer in the Netherlands. He has had a significant impact on Dutch law, and is also known for his battle for (legal) emancipation of the Dutch Jews.

The Jonas Daniël Meijerplein, a square in Amsterdam (where Meijer died), was named after him. Bordering the square are the Esnoga and four former synagogues, now together home of the Joods Historisch Museum (Jewish Historical Museum). The Dokwerker monument on Jonas Daniel Meijerplein commemorates the February strike of 1941, a general strike by many (non-Jewish) people of Amsterdam and surrounding cities after the arrest and deportation of 425 Jewish men from Amsterdam to Mauthausen and Buchenwald following a clash between Nazi police and two Jewish men a couple of days earlier.

== Early life ==
Jonas Daniel Meijer was born into a well-to-do Jewish family at Arnhem. His maternal grandfather was Benjamin Cohen (July or August 1725 – 10 February 1800), a well-known businessman and Jewish teacher, and a friend and supporter of stadtholder Willem V. The Cohen family were tobacco traders, and had connections to prominent European Jewish families. Meijer's father was a German Jew, who hailed from the city of Hamburg. Jonas Daniel Meijer had one brother and one sister, Abraham David (8 October 1781 – 17 March 1864) and Eva (15 October 1782 – 18 December 1850).

At a startling young age, Jonas learned to read and was taught French and English by a private teacher. Although he was brought up with Hebrew as the liturgical language of his religion, Jonas also managed to learn Latin at the age of 5. After completing his school quite early, Meijer started to study law in Amsterdam, where he moved with his mother and siblings after the death of his father in 1790. On 15 November 1796, at the age of just 16, Jonas Daniel Meijer took the lawyer's oath, becoming the first Jewish lawyer and one of the youngest lawyers in the history of the Netherlands. Despite his talents, he received only few customers, as many Christians avoided him. The small practice however gave Meijer ample chance of increasing his law expertise, specifically by studying the law of many countries, earning him fame across the European continent.

== Publications ==
Meijer received international fame through his publication Kan de zedelijke waardering van een handeling in aanmerking komen bij de vaststelling en toepassing van een strafwet en zo ja, in hoeverre ("Can the moral appreciation of an act be taken into account when establishing and applying a criminal law and, if so, to what extent", 1803). In this work, Meijer is one of the first to question the extent to which living conditions and mental well-being of a criminal cause his felony. Meijer researched the possibility of such outcomes because of his acquaintance with financial and social positions of his fellow Jews, that made him understand why some of them would, for example, steal a loaf of bread.

Jonas Daniel Meijer died on 6 December 1834 at the age of 54, in Amsterdam.
