= William H. Machen =

American painter

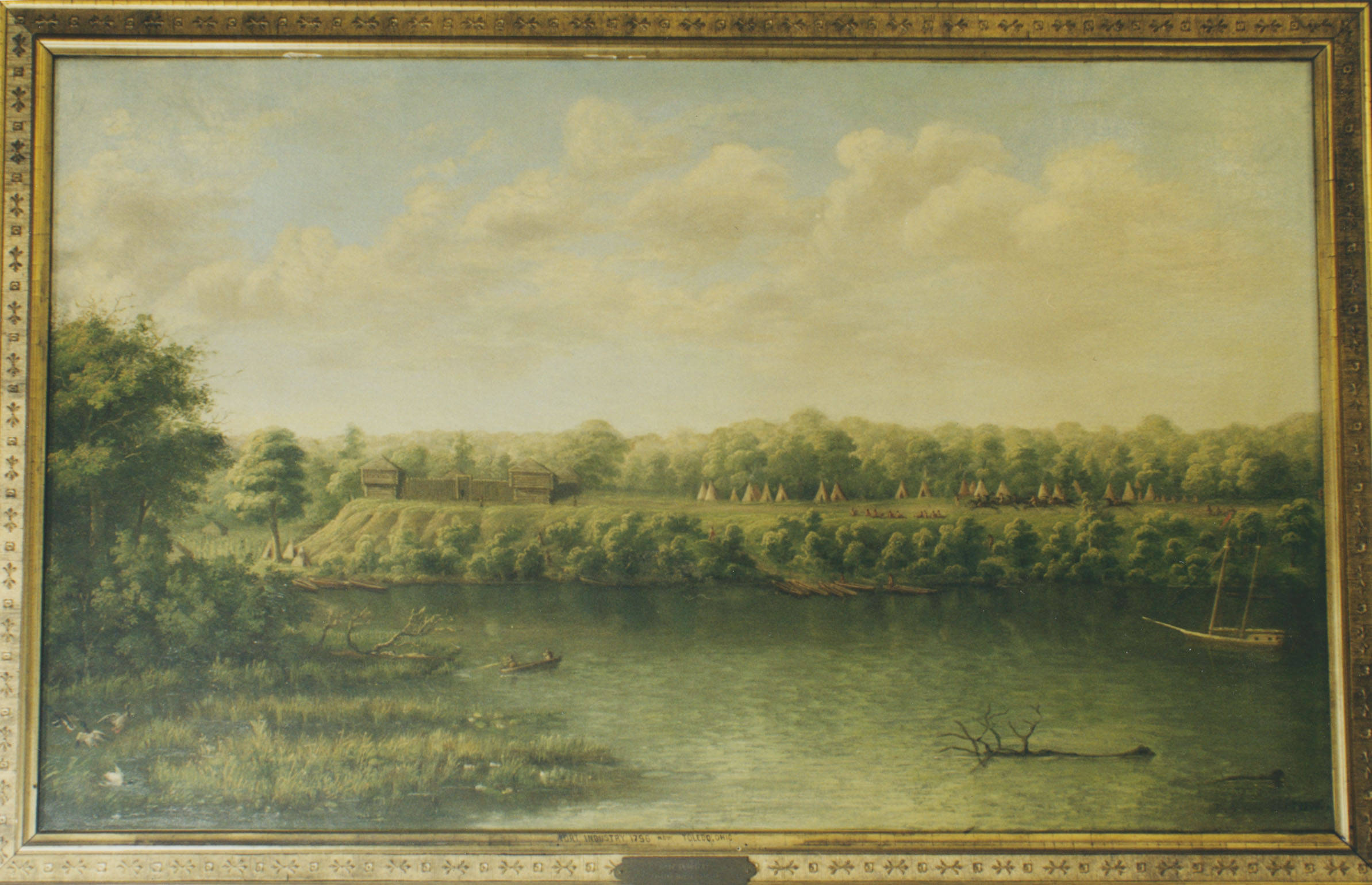
Painting of Fort Industry by William Machen

William Henry Machen (February 10, 1832 in Arnhem – June 19, 1911 in Washington, D.C.) was a painter and teacher.

William Henry Machen was born in Arnhem, the Netherlands. He was the oldest son of Augustine Ulysses Machen, a government-employed civil engineer, and Agatha Kuyke of Werkendam, the Netherlands. His early education was by tutors. He also received art instruction from his uncle, C. W. Kuyke, a portrait painter in Arnhem.

In 1847 Augustine, Agatha, son William, along with his four brothers and two sisters sailed from Rotterdam for America. Two sisters died en route and were buried at sea. The remaining family members arrived in New York in September. From there they made their way via the Hudson River to Albany, via the Erie Canal to Buffalo, and finally across Lake Erie to Cleveland, where they stayed for the winter.

At the suggestion of Bishop Amadeus Rappe of Cleveland, Augustine and young William traveled on horseback to Toledo in February 1848 to inspect a 100-acre (0.40 km^{2}) farm at the town's edge. They soon purchased the land and in April the family settled in Toledo. Augustine's brother, Henry P.L. Machen, and his wife, Wilhelmina, and their children also arrived and settled on the same land.

The farm setting gave William ample subjects for his paintings—landscapes, game birds, animals, rivers and streams. He also painted portraits, religious subjects, still life, and local scenery. Most of his work was oil, but also water color, pencil sketches, and some pen and ink. Architectural design was not beyond his talents.

In 1861 William married Mary Ann Short of Buffalo, New York. Together they had six sons and three daughters. Their oldest son later became Assistant Postmaster General. Another son became a prominent Washington physician.

He exhibited his work at the Pennsylvania Academy, the 1876 Centennial Exposition in Philadelphia, and the Detroit Museum of Art.

But, although art was his profession, he was also an accomplished musician and composer. He served as organist and choir director for St. Francis de Sales church in Toledo for several years. He and his younger brother August also played in a local band.

He was talented in other ways too. He was a naturalist by inclination and studied extensively in that area. He also was fluent in six languages, frequently serving as an interpreter.

In 1882 William and his family moved to Detroit, where he taught art at Detroit College (later University of Detroit) and Sacred Heart Convent at Grosse Pointe. He continued his prolific art work, including portraits, religious subjects, and a variety of others.

The artist and his family remained in Detroit for 12 years. He eventually moved to Washington, D.C. in 1894. There he continued his painting, completing many portraits, still life, and scenes of nature.

He was a devout lifelong Catholic. He died in Washington in 1911 at age 79. He was buried in Calvary Cemetery in Toledo.

In his lifetime William Machen completed more than 2700 oil paintings, watercolors, drawings, and sketches. He maintained a single register of his works which is now preserved in the Archives of American Art at the Smithsonian Institution in Washington.

== Source Information ==
Peter Falk, "Who Was Who in American Art"
