= Goos Meeuwsen =

Dutch Artist

Goos Meeuwsen (born Arnhem, 1982) is a Dutch circus artist.

== Biography ==
He took his first steps in juggling and the art of clowning in the Arnhem-based circusschool "Poehaa". As from age nine he performed in the annual Worldstar Christmas Circus in Arnhem's Rijnhal. In 1998, he and his friend Ramon Hopman performed in Cirque d'Hiver in Roermond.

Meeuwsen studied at the École Nationale de Cirque de Montréal. In 2004, after graduation, he performed together with former classmates James Tanabe and Annie-Kim Déry in the show Till Tomorrow. In 2006, he had a leading part as Nowhere Man in Cirque du Soleil's show Love, performing in The Mirage, Las Vegas.

In 2008, he starred in the Swiss Cirque Starlight, and in Cirque Bouffon. At the Festival Cirque de Demain of 2008 he was awarded a prize.

In 2010, Meeuwsen starred in the Cirque Bouffon show Angell.
