= Alurrpa Pananga =

Indigenous Australian leader (c. 1870 – c 1940)

Alurrpa Pananga also known as Sandhill Bob, (c. 1870 – c. 1940) was an Eastern Arrernte and Wangkangurru man and a leader of his people.

== Life in the Northern Territory ==
Pananga was born at Urringa, a water soakage on the Plenty River and his Dreaming was that of the perentie. He was the eldest of six children and, as a child, his family would travel regularly in the extended region and throughout the Simpson Desert. Much of this travel is likely to have been related to the trade of pituri.

At the age of eight Pananga first heard of the European settlers in the area and stories were shared about their 'monster' animals (horses). The family remained in limited contact with the Europeans until the late-1880s when there was a gold rush at Arltunga, at what is now the Arltunga Historical Reserve, in 1887 and were attracted by more stories of strange people, animals and goods.

Pananga quickly learned many of the ways of the Europeans and, in 1891, it is believed that he guided David Lindsay and that it was Lindsay who began to call him 'Bob' as he could not pronounce his name.

In 1904 Pananga also acted as a guide to Walter Smith Purula (then a child) and his uncle who were prospecting for gold on the Hale River. In 1910, again alongside Smith, he was a participant in the Arrernte peoples last large ceremonial gathering, a corroboree, in the Simpson Desert. It was the last of these at this site.

Around this period Pananga's parents settled in Boulia, Queensland and he travelled there on several occasions to visit them; while travelling he would often perform the Mulunga corroboree and he was a key figure in 'carrying' (travelling and performing) this ceremony.

Many Aboriginal people in Central Australia died in the 1919 - 1920 Spanish flu epidemic but Pananga and his wife (unnamed) remained healthy and, the loss of so many people, including the younger generation, caused great concern to the then elders of the community. In 1929 they determined they would teach as much as they could to Walter Smith Purula and Pananga acted as his guide.

Pananga travelled with Smith in the winter of 1929 and guided him across sandhills and visited cultural sites with him and taught him important songs. Smith remembers Pananga's grief when travelling that they never saw signs or smoke signaling that other of their people were travelling there as they once had. In describing Pananga Smith said to Dick Kimber:

He was born in the sandhilll country, mate," said Walter, explaining why he was called Sandhill Bob. "Place called Urringa - Simpson Desert Urringa. Where the fire started in the early days - Dreaming time - and burnt down to a place called Wire Creek Bore, north side of a place called Oodnadatta. That's old Urringa, that Pereniti[e] Dreaming - he made the fire; that's Sandhill Bob

— Walter Smith Pururla, Man from Arltunga: Walter Smith Australian Bushman (1986), p. 77

A side effort of their travel was to locate gold or copper that would enable their people to become independent and, in this, they were unsuccessful.

As he aged Pananga, remained nomadic although, as he aged, he was obliged to stay on more well defined paths. He and his wife died in about 1940 during a period of intense heat. Historian Dick Kimber believed that Pananga's death marked the end of an era and that:

He was the last person to have grown to young manhood in the northern Simpson Desert before the great disruptions occurred with the coming of the Europeans.

— Dick Kimber, NT Dictionary of Biography (2008)
