= Anilios fossor =

Scientific classification
- Kingdom: Animalia
- Phylum: Chordata
- Class: Reptilia
- Order: Squamata
- Suborder: Serpentes
- Family: Typhlopidae
- Genus: Anilios
- Species: A. fossor

Binomial name
- Anilios fossor Shea, 2015

Species of Australian blind snake

Anilios fossor, also known as the miner blind snake, is a species of blind snake that is endemic to Australia. The specific epithet fossor (“digger”) refers to the snake's fossorial habits as well as to the type locality.

== Description ==
The species grows to about 29 cm in length.

== Behaviour ==
The species is oviparous.

== Distribution and habitat ==
The snake is found in the south-eastern Northern Territory in the vicinity of the Hale River. The habitat is Eucalyptus camaldulensis riverine woodland on sandy loam soils. The type locality is the Ruby Gap Nature Park, where the Northern Territory's first mining rush took place, following the discovery of garnets (misidentified as rubies) in the bed of the river.
