= Sam Irvine =

Australian mail contractor (1890–1959)

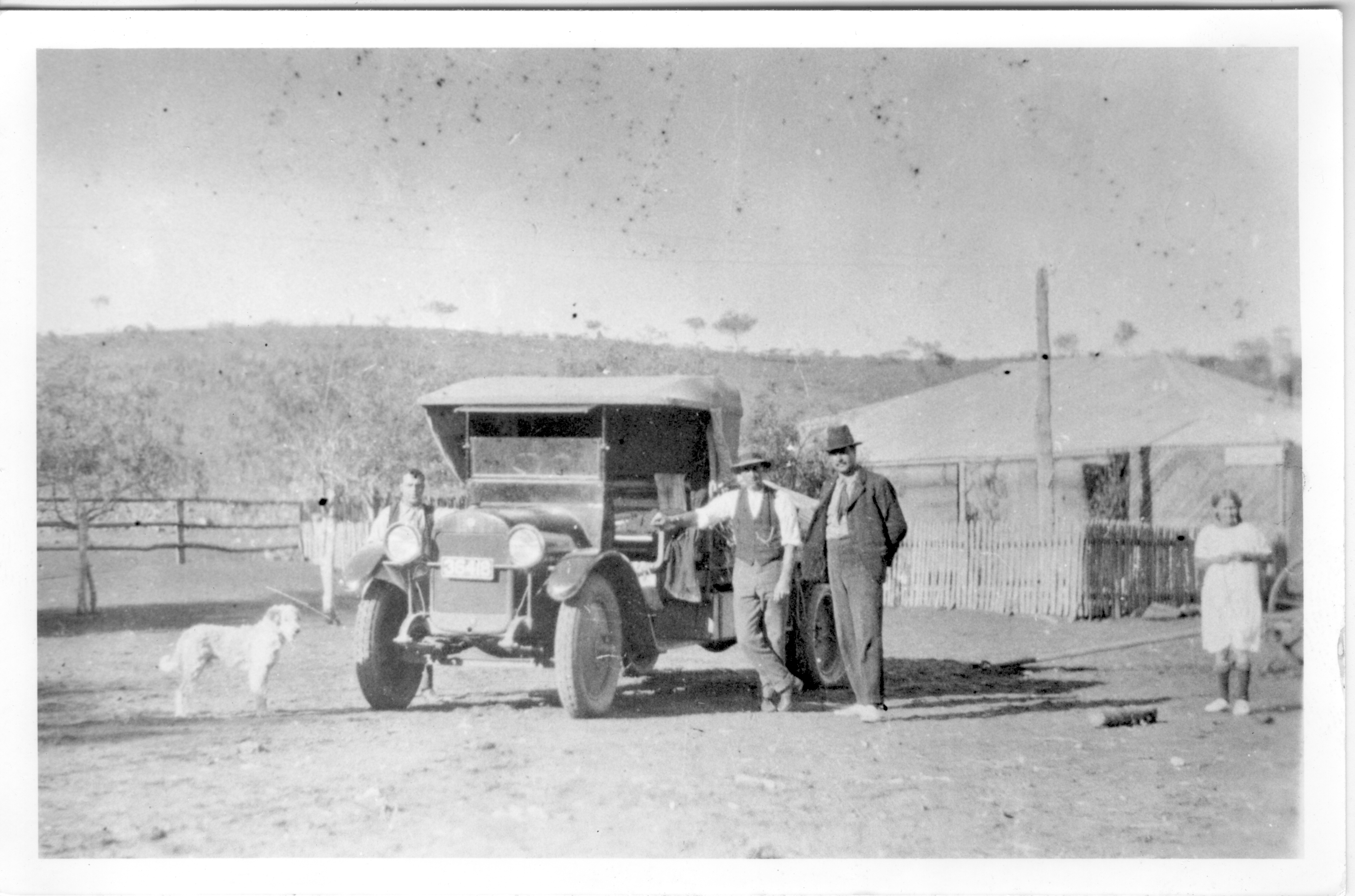
Sam Irvine's vehicle with Irvine shown on the left, c.1920s

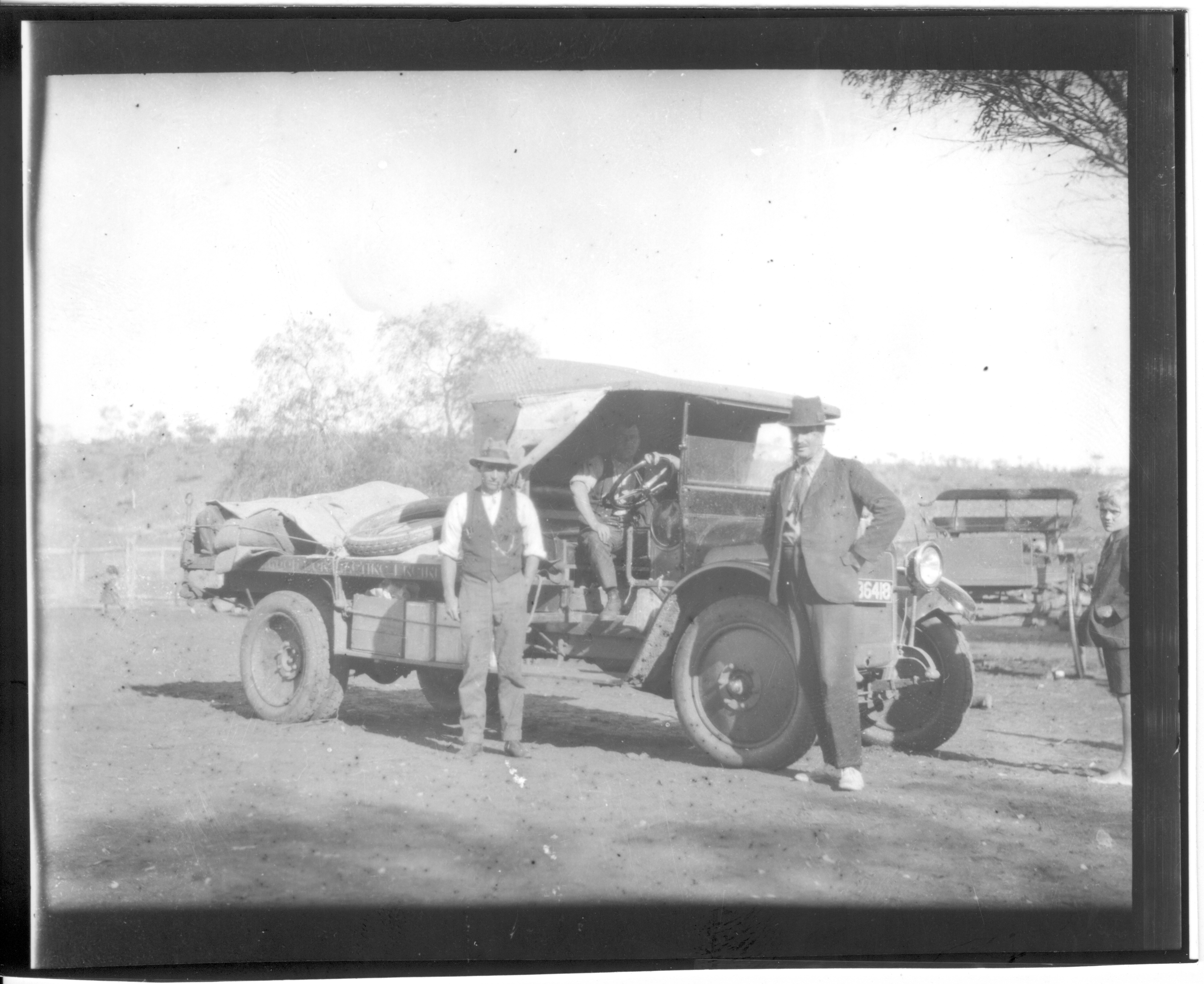
Sam Irvine at the wheel, c.1920s

Sam Irvine (12 January 1890 – 12 December 1959) was a bushman and mail contractor who worked throughout the Northern Territory in the 1920s and 1930s and became well known figure in the area. Ernestine Hill called Irvine a "hero of the north".

== Early life ==
Irvine was born 12 January 1890, the youngest of 12 children to Scottish immigrants John and Margaret Irvine in Boucaut, South Australia. Irvine started work at a young age, when he was only 14, and worked on various cattle stations and wool sheds in the area.

At 22 Irvine married Mary Farrell, at St Ignatius Church in Norwood, who he had met when working at Coonamoon Station; their wedding was held in the vestry of the church as Irvine was not a Roman Catholic like Mary. The couple would go on to have 4 children; Margaret, Jean, Donald and Kathleen. In 1919, for the education of their children, the family moved to Adelaide and, unable to find work, Irvine took on the mail contract between Kingoonya and Coober Pedy in 1920 (a distance of 218.63 km or 135.85 miles). Irvine was the first contractor on this mail run to motorise the mail service, which had previously being done using camel train or pack horse, and, in doing so, had to make his own road and even cut the last 96 km or 60 miles through the opal fields. He created many of these roads by dragging a log or steel bar behind his truck. Irvine also had to carry a significant collection of spare parts as there were no mechanics or service stations to help and few people had his mechanical knowledge.

This separation from his family, differences in religion, loneliness in the work he was doing and other personal problems contributed to his relationship with his wife breaking down.

== Life in the Northern Territory ==
From 1925 to 1929 Irvine moved on to the Oodnadatta-to-Alice Springs mail run (a distance of 665 km or 413 miles) and, on this run, he had to use both his truck and camels to complete the very sandy run. Irvine also held the contract for the shorter run between Alice Springs and Arltunga (which he kept until 1932). After the railway was completed in 1929 his mail run was completed by the train so Irvine took on the Alice Springs to Tennant Creek mail contract and began carrying passengers also; which was later extended to include Newcastle Waters and Birdum (Larrimah).

It was during this time that Irvine became a well known figure in Central Australia, described as broad-shouldered and ever-smiling, and "Territorians knew that if it was humanly possible to get the mail through on time, even on occasion with four bare rims, Sam Irvine did it".

Australian author Ernestine Hill travelled from Alice Springs to Birdum with Irvine in 1932, a journey which took 17 days, and published her article "Racing in the Rain in the Heart of Australia" in The Advertiser (Adelaide) which was published 29 April 1933. In this article she described Irvine as:

For the outback mailman, rain or sun, through menace of thirst or possibility of drowning, all life must run to schedule.

He is a friend to everyone in the north and many owe thanks to him, for Sam has grub-staked more than his share of unfortunate travellers. Friend and confidant, doctor and nurse, private secretary and bush lawyer on occasion; guardian angel for the many miles of desolation, Sam Irvine is one of the most popular and best known figures of the Centre.

I shall always remember him, sitting upon a pyramid of mailbags in the mud, drinking a pannikin of strong cold tea, and wet to the skin, removing from his weary limbs the yellow clay that carried his skin with it. "His Majesty's Mail" said Sam, surveying the wreckage "I wish that he could see this lot"

— Ernestine Hill, The Advertiser

Another famous passenger that Irvine travelled with was Olive Pink, a botanical illustrator and anthropologist with an eccentric reputation. According to Reg Harris Pink advised Irvine that she had a loaded revolver under her pillow and that he should keep his distance and that Irvine replied "with a face like that you don't need a revolver."

In December 1937 Irvine injured himself when lifting a heavy drum of petrol and was replaced by Kurt Johannsen. Irvine did not return to his mail run and worked as the acting manager at Granite Downs, where his wife briefly joined him, before returning to the Northern Territory in 1940 to take a job with the NT Works Department as a grader driver; later setting himself up as a contractor.

== Later life ==
In the 1950s Irvine retired to Alice Springs where he lived in his caravan and, a year after being brutally beaten and robbed in his caravan, leaving him requiring care, he suffered from a stroke and died on 12 November 1959. He is buried at the Alice Springs Memorial Cemetery, where the epitaph reads "Outback pioneer, mail man, our first truckie".

Irvine was inducted into the Shell Rimula Wall of Fame at ReUnion 2005.
