= Ben Nicker =

Australian explorer (1908–1941)

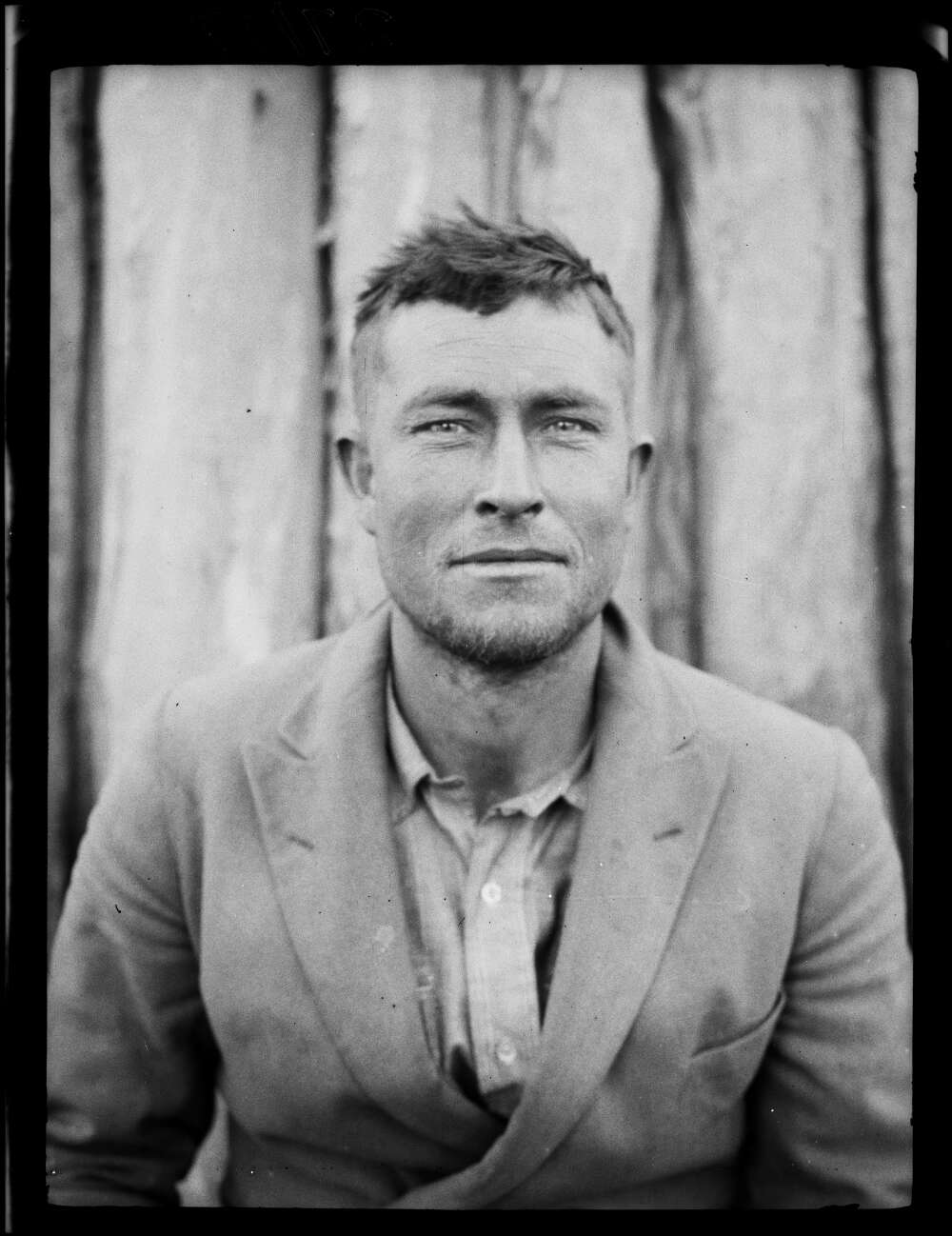
Ben Nicker at the beginning of the Michael Terry expedition, Northern Territory, 1932

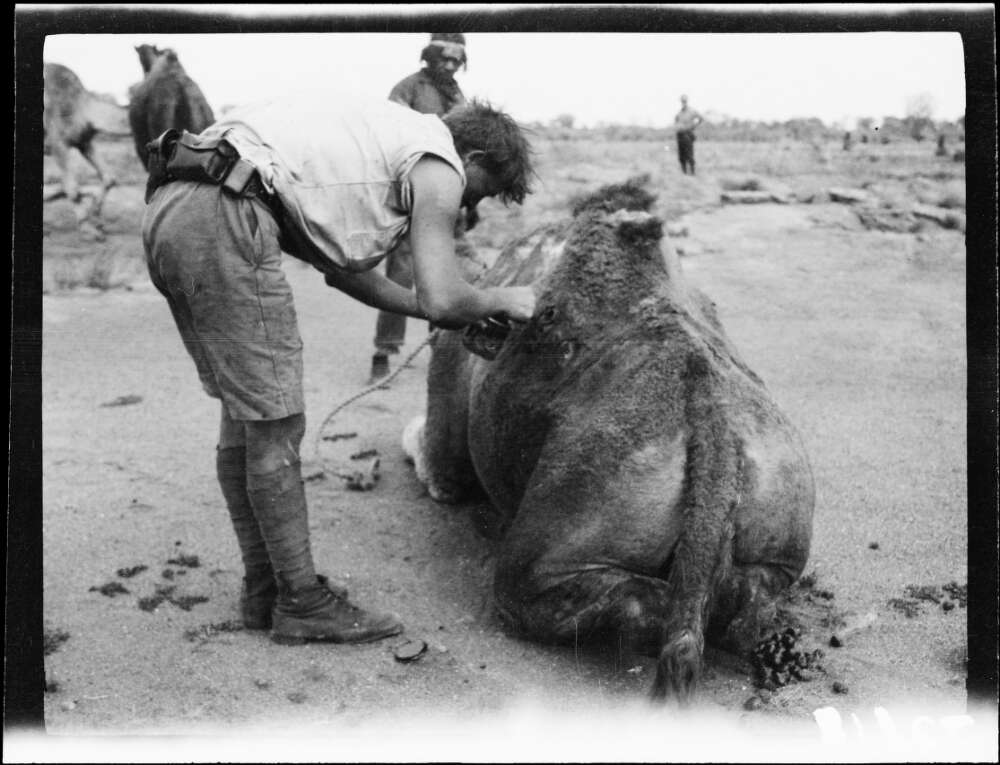
Ben Nicker tending a camel, Lake Mackay region, Northern Territory, 1933

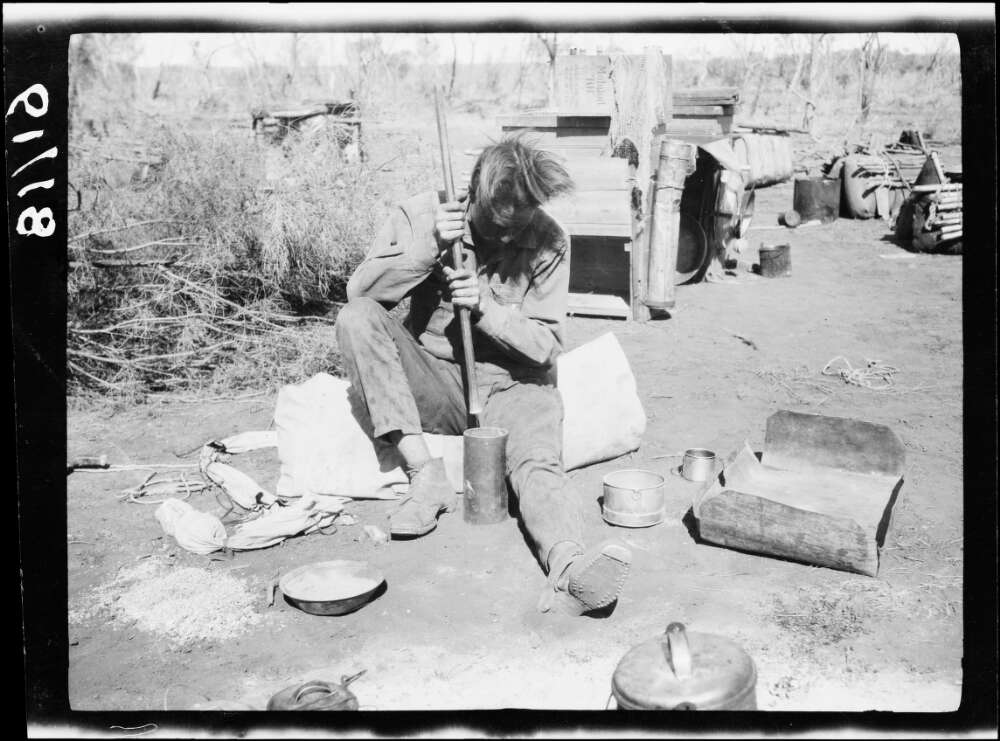
Ben Nicker crushing rock samples in a dolly pot, Northern Territory, 1933

Benjamin Esmond Nicker (3 March 1908 – 19 April 1941) was an Australian explorer raised in Central Australia. In 1923, at 15, Nicker crossed the Tanami Desert solo and, in 1932 and 1933 he guided the expeditions of Michael Terry through the Gibson Desert.

== Early life ==
Nicker was the son of Elizabeth and Sam Nicker who arrived at the Arltunga goldfields in the Northern Territory in 1903, after a two-year journey through the centre, by which time the output of gold had already diminished. This disappointed the two and, rather than mine Sam purchased a wagon from a "disgruntled quitter" and delivered water to the miners whilst Elizabeth started a market garden and herded feral goats for milk, meat and useful skins.

By 1908, when Nicker was born, the family had moved, a little north of Arltunga, to establish what would become The Garden station which would provide produce, on a larger scale the Elizabeth's market garden, to the Arltunga and Winnecke Depot goldfields.

In 1914 they uprooted again when Sam purchased the lease on Ryan's Well, near Aileron, where the family operated a cattle station and supplemented their income by operating the well for travelling stock and operating as a post and telegraph office.

It was at Ryan's Well, which the family called Glen Maggie, that Nicker developed a relationship with the passing Afghan Cameleers and one of them, Sadiq, gifted Nicker with an orphaned camel calf and he spent a lot of time training the camel and exploring the station.

== Explorations ==
In 1923 Joe Brown, an explorer and prospector, came through Ryan's Well on his way to cross the Tanami Desert and 15 year old Nicker convinced his parents to let him go with him. Nicker was unable to take his camels, as they didn't get along with Brown's horses and, instead, he took two station horses with him.

Brown is described as an argumentative and difficult man and at Halls Creek the two parted company leaving Nicker to travel alone back to Ryan's Well. This was a very dangerous journey, in which many had died, at any time but was especially so in 1923 with the desert in the midst of severe drought and many wells in disuse.

In his book The Last Explorer Michael Terry says:

At fifteen, he had come back alive and well. He had safely completed the finest, riskiest, solo venture in inland history, so I claim.

— Michael Terry, The Last Explorer (1987)

Following his return from this expedition in 1924 Nicker continued to explore in order to take in points of interest he had heard about and to make his own discoveries. He was helped in his explorations by his language skills as he could fluently speak a number of local languages including Luritja, Pitjantjatjara, Ngaanyatjarra and Pintupi.

In 1928 Nicker met Terry for the first time and "the stage was set for a mutual admiration which would last a life time".

Nicker served as Terry's guide, alongside Aboriginal cameleers, on his 1932 and 1933 expeditions which, under his influence, used camels only. These expeditions became the subject of Terry's book Sun and Sand (1937) and images from this journey are available through the National Library of Australia.

== World War II ==
In 1939 Nicker volunteered to enlist into World War II where, after a brief time at the Colchester Barracks, approximately 50 km (31 mi) from London, he met a local girl named Jane whom he married by special licence after a month of courtship. The couple were only able to spend six weeks together.

Following this he was first sent to the Middle East before being sent to Greece where he died on 19 April 1941.
