= Winnecke Goldfield =

Goldfield in Northern Territory, Australia

- Location within Northern Territory
- Location: Northern Territory, Hart
- Coordinates: 23°20′18″S 134°21′56″E
- Governing body: Parks and Wildlife Commission of the Northern Territory

The Winnecke Goldfield, sometimes known as Winnecke Depot Goldfield, is a now abandoned goldfield about 70 kilometres north east of Alice Springs and 50 kilometres north west of Arltunga. It is located within the Central Desert Shire Council region. It is on the lands of the Eastern Arrernte people, who are the traditional owners, and it is within the estate known as Inerentye.

It was most productive between 1901 - 1905 with sporadic activity up until the outbreak of World War II. The total recorded production was about 1,500 ounces.

== History ==
The goldfields are named for surveyor Charles Winnecke who established a depot there whilst first mapping the area in 1879.

Gold was discovered there in late 1902 by prospector William Russel and it was a start of the gold rush; this meant that, by January 1903 there were 200 men there and 400 by June. This was widely reported throughout Australia and Charles Chewings said that there were exposed reefs that stood "nearly vertical" and that "in all of these free gold is visible in nearly every stone broken".

This rush caused significant problems due to a lack of resources. A well sunk there in 1903 was soon polluted by cattle and it led to several deaths from typhoid. The water supply was soon cleaned up and fenced but the rush was ending and there was a rapid decline in the population.

In 1903 a guide and handbook was produced by Robert Sands Frearson which included the warning:

While faithfully placing before the public my impression regarding the probable good results that will follow the expenditure of capital on the Arltunga and Winnecke’s Depot Goldfields, I must warn all men who think of going to these fields that, unless they have their best friend (say £75 to £100) in their pockets, they will most undoubtedly, have tremendous hardships to encounter.

— Robert Sands Frearson, R.S. Frearson's guide and handbook to the Arltunga and Winnecke's Depot goldfields, MacDonnell Ranges, South Australia, 1903

In 1905 a Coorong Battery was placed at the Coorong Gold Mine at the goldfield, and it is an example of early steam engine technology of Hawke and Co. The battery was located on the side of the hill, so slurry would fall over the amalgamation plates. The mine was operated by a private miners syndicate until 1907 and the sold to the Commonwealth Government. The government then shut it, and the battery, down sometime after 1913 due to financial losses and safety concerns.

On visitor to the Coorong Battery in 1905 was Doris Blackwell who travelled there alongside her governess Mabel Mary Taylor. One their visit they stayed with the Battery Manager, George Lines, and his wife. Blackwell described the goldfield as "a calico village, a straggling land and tents and bough shelters" and that is had "an atmosphere of ugly impermanence".

Blackwell visited again, in around 1907, with her father Thomas Bradshaw and was surprised by the changes to it; she said:

I was astonished by the utter desolation of the place. I wondered if I had dreamt that there had ever been a street with several stores, an hotel, and a number of houses. They had disappeared as completely as if picked up in a whirlwind and scattered across the near-by Simpson Desert.

— Doris Blackwell, Alice on the line (1975), p. 196

From 1933 some of the miners at the Winnecke Goldfield were Italian migrants Pascale "Patsy" and Maria Antonia Ciccone and their three most productive workings there were 'Patsy's Prospect', Big Gun' and 'Pyritic Show'. With government aid they bought a small crushing plant but they struggled to succeed there and moved on to the Tennant Creek and Wauchope Wolfram Fields. In 1938 they returned to Winnecke, alongside their Giuseppe and Maria Concetta Gagliardi (their son-in-law and daughter) for a short time due to insufficient water being available to run the larger equipment.

Other miners in the region at the time were the Johannsen family, including Gerhardt Johannsen and his son Kurt Johannsen.

In 1993 Ciccone's crushing plant was moved from the abandoned Winnekce Goldfield to Arltunga Historical Reserve where it is preserved.

== Winnecke Goldfield Cemetery ==
There is an unofficial cemetery site at the goldfield which was primarily used to bury those who died during the typhoid outbreak. It consists of seven graves and the earliest, and only identifiable grave, is the one for Drew Williams, a prospector, who died on 31 May 1903.

This site was heritage protected in 2001.

== Gallery ==
Coorong battery depot, Winnecke goldfields, 1905

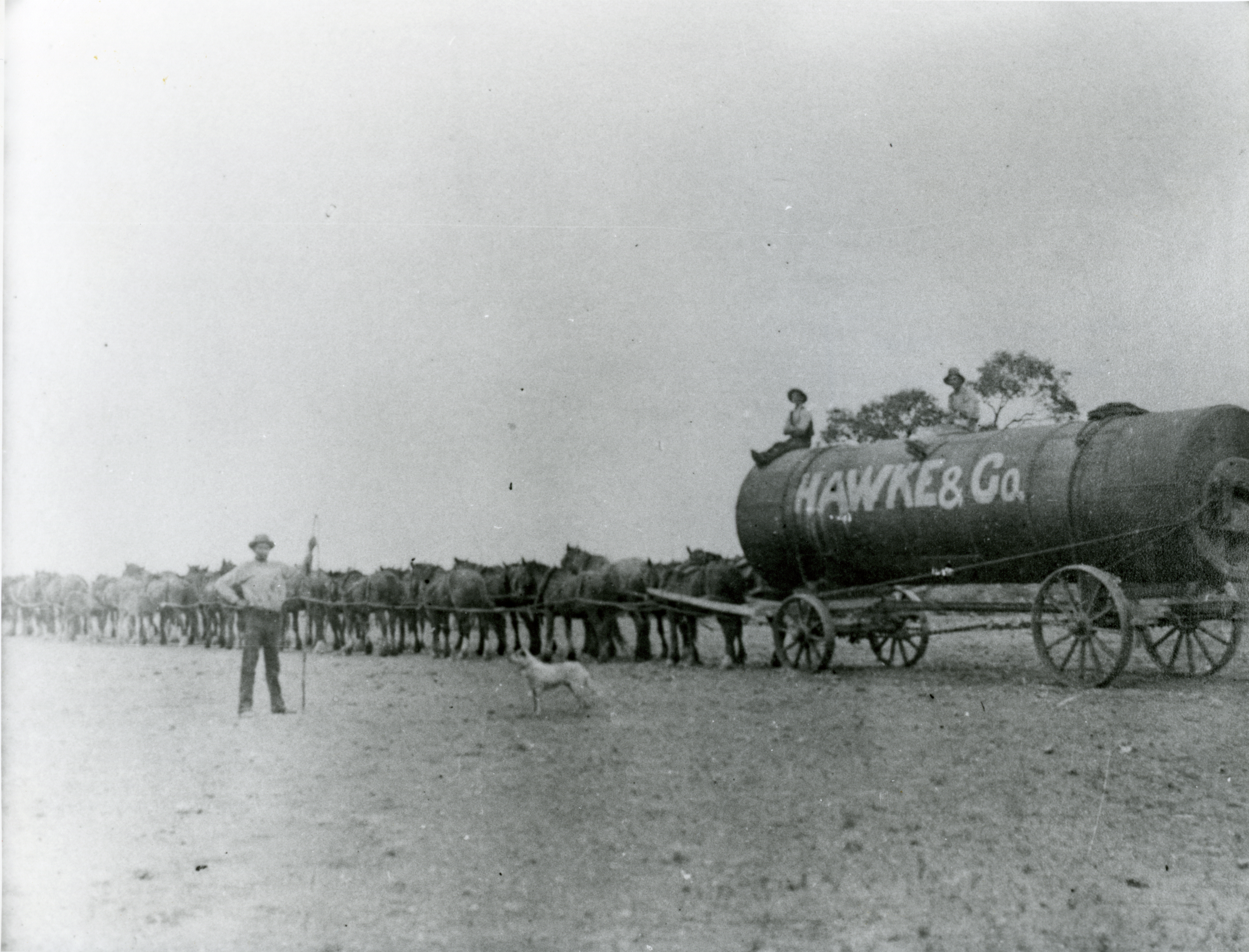
Boiler from Winnecke depot being transported by a team of horses, 1905

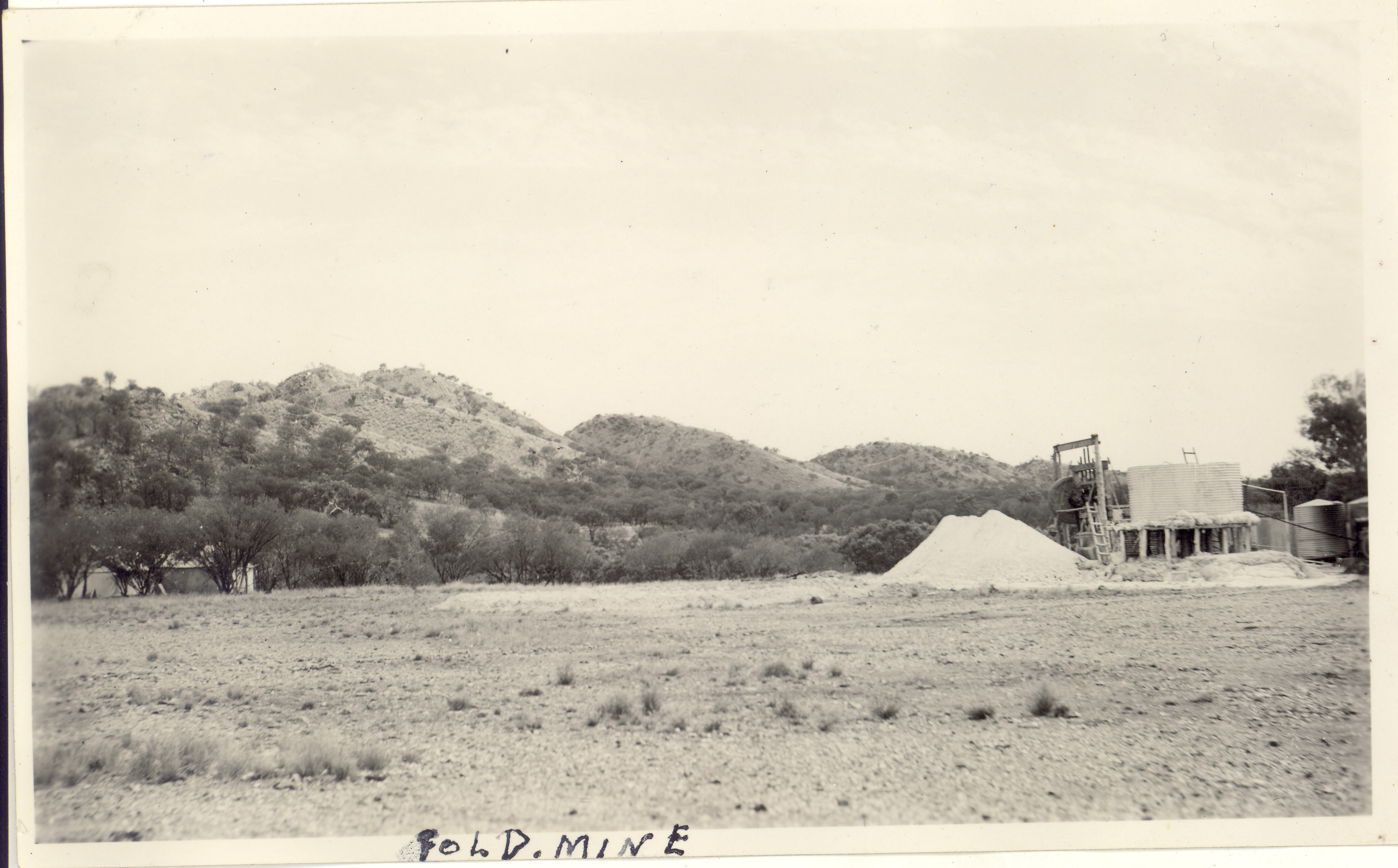
Photo of Pascale Ciccone's mine at Winnecke, taken between 1938 - 1939

Winnecke Goldfields in 1938

Winnecke, 1938, crushing plant

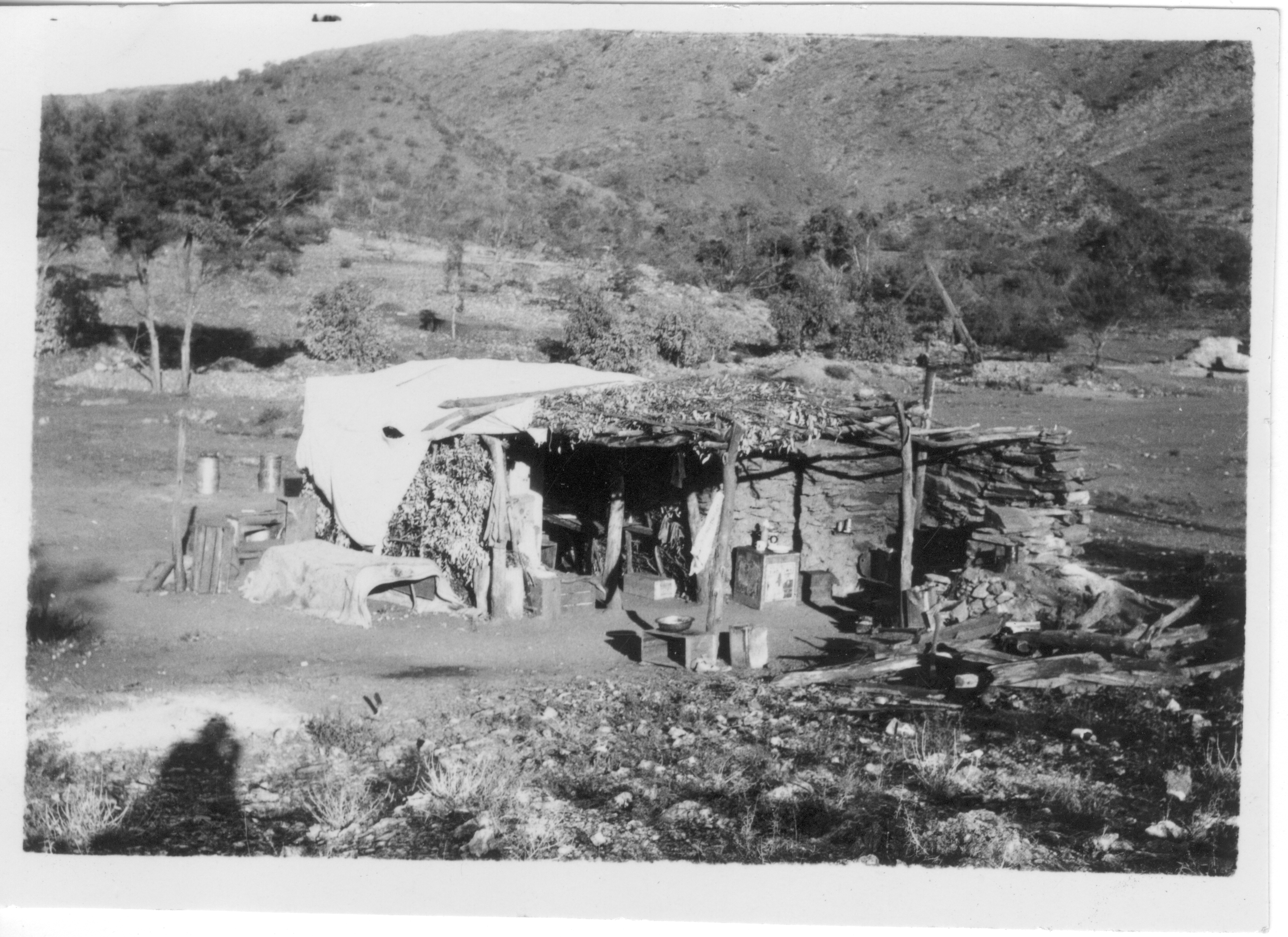
The Johannsen's home at Winnecke, c.1930s

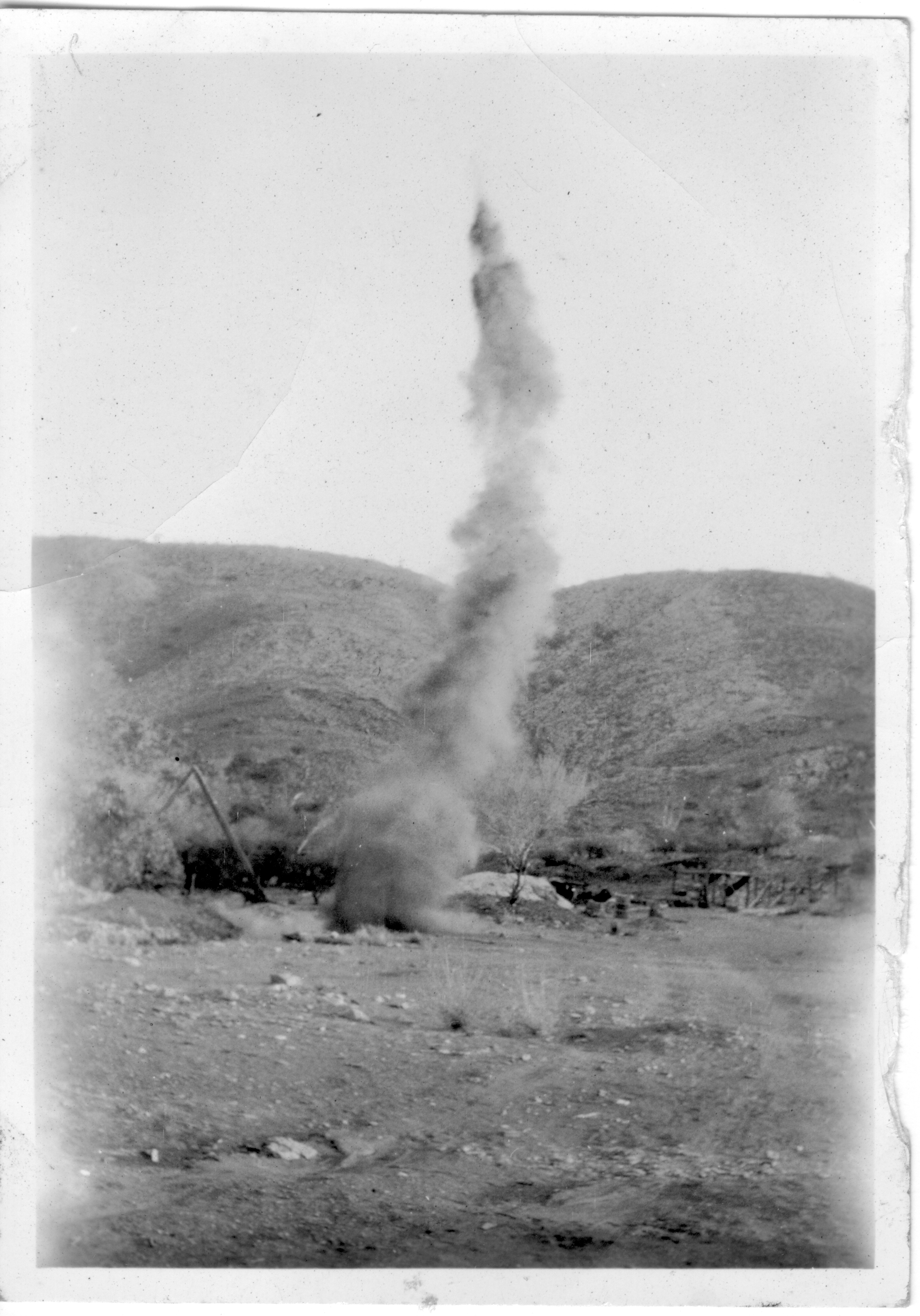
A willy willy near the Johannsen mine, c.1930s

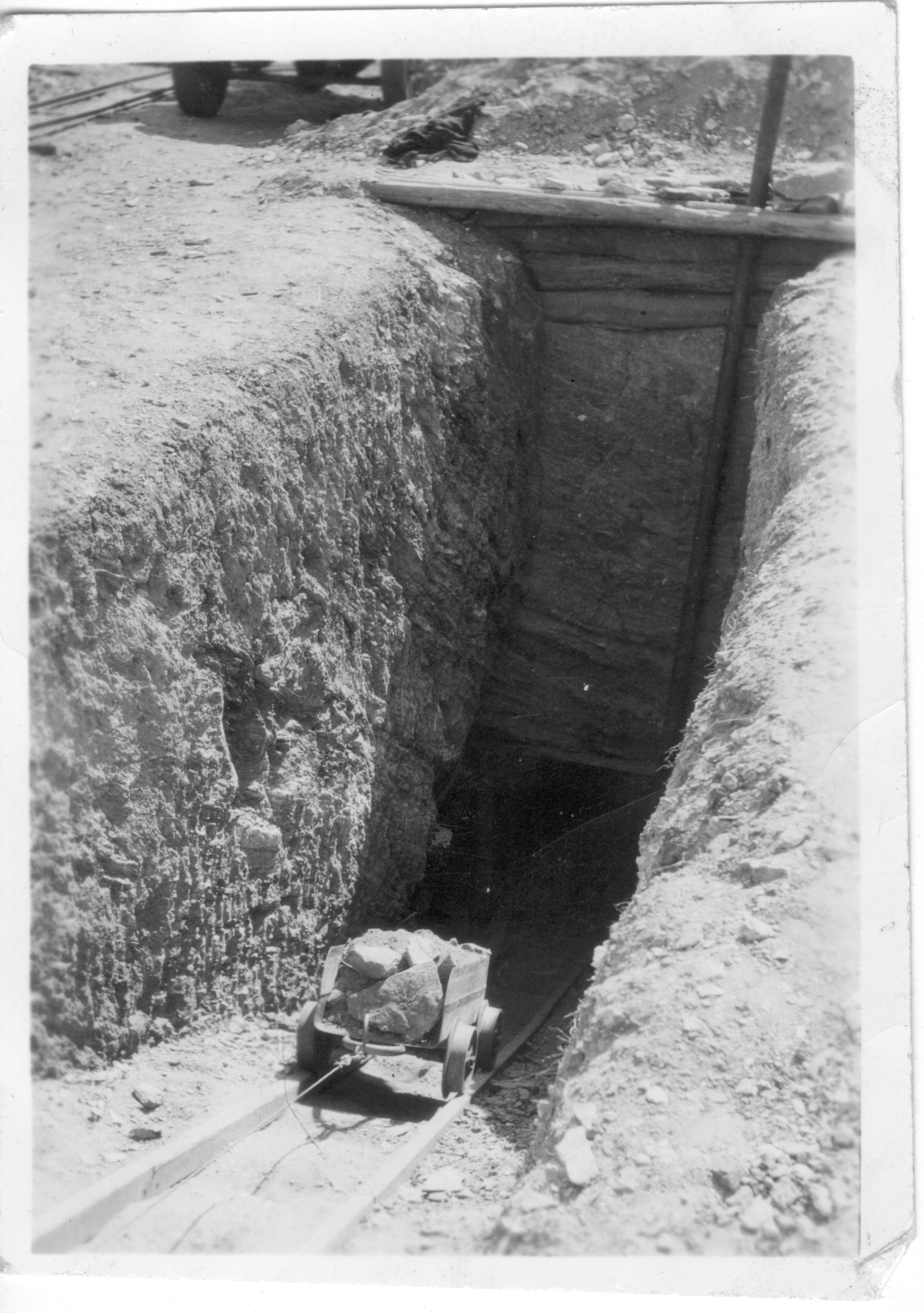
The Johannsen mine at Winnecke, c.1930s
