= Ruby Gap Nature Park =

Protected area in Northern Territory, Australia

Coordinates: 23.488°S 135.020°E

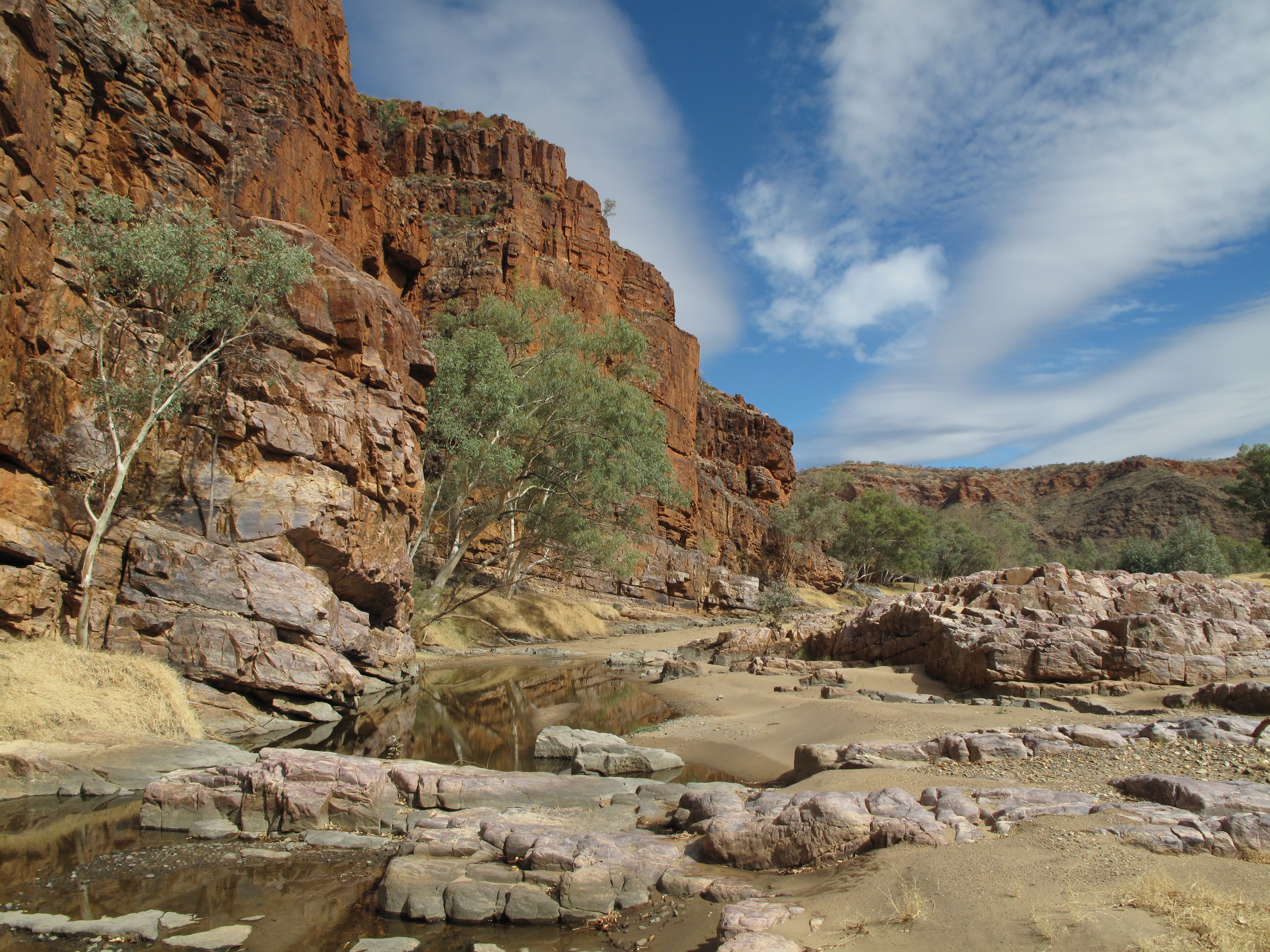
Cliff lines in Ruby Gap Nature Park, 2009

Ruby Gap Nature Park or Tyweltherreme is a protected area in the Northern Territory of Australia consisting of 9,257 hectares and access to it is through Arltunga Historical Reserve.

The park is 150 kilometres from Alice Springs and is the site of Central Australia's first mining rush from 1886. This discovery was shortly before David Lindsay's discovery of gold at Arltunga, 45 kilometers to the west. By May 1888 there were over 260 people in the area prospecting for rubies at the site.

At the beginning of this ruby rush flooded the market for rubies and soon questions arose as to their quality. By June 1888 it was found that the stones being mined were high quality garnets and not rubies. These were of considerably less value then rubies and the market crashed.

The traditional owners of this Country are the Eastern Arrernte people (Ulpmerre arenye) and it is a part of the Ulpmerre estate.

== History ==
In March 1886 explorer David Lindsay found what he thought were rubies at what became known as Ruby Gap in the bed of the Hale River (Lhere Altera/Arletherre) and he wrote in his diary on 8 March 1886 that he had discovered a granite bar "completely studded with garnets or rubies".

Later, in a report to the Royal Geographical Society of Australasia he wrote in more detail saying:

Still travelling eastward we found water in the sand in a few places, and tin in a granite hill, also a bar of granite completely studded with garnets crossing the creek. Just above this point, when scratching for water under a rocky cliff, I found some quantity of beautiful gem sand, containing many garnets and some red stones of great brilliancy, which, after careful examination, I believe to be rubies.

— David Lindsay, Explorations in the Northern Territory of South Australia (1888), The Royal Geographical Society of Australasia, South Australian Branch

As a part of this discovery he also named a nearby gorge Glen Annie gorge after his wife.

Alternatively, one of the other members of the party, Arthur Warman, claimed that it was he that made the initial discovery of the gems. It was then Warman who took them to a jeweler who said that they were rubies. Warman quickly made mining claims at Ruby Gap (applications dated 4 April 1887) and formed a mining syndicate which later formed into a company known as the MacDonnell Ranges Ruby Mining Company Ltd. In April 1887 the eight members of the syndicate travelled together to Ruby Gap and reached there on 23 May 1887 and, within two weeks, they collected between 30,000 and 40,000 gems. Richard Pearson, who would become the public face of the syndicate, claimed in a newspaper article, that one single gem found was worth £8,000 and that the total value of all gems found was £60,000. The party arrived back in Adelaide on 15 July 1887 and the day following their return they made applications for further mining leases and to more clearly define their claim boundaries.

Shortly after their return Pearson sailed to London on 11 August 1887 with a large number of stones to obtain expert opinion on their value, on this trip he also accepted an offer of £200,000 from British speculators for the leases which fell through when it was discovered that they were not, in fact, rubies. News that the gems were not rubies, and were in fact high quality garnets, was spread by Edward Rennie, the president of the Royal Society of South Australia, in his report "On some so-called South Australian rubies" which he read to a gathering of the Society; these were then published in 1889. This followed extended debates between a number of experts and was seen as the final word on the matter and news broke around the ruby field on 24 May 1888.

Anecdotal accounts talk of a sudden exodus from the field and, by June 1888, applications for claims had come to an abrupt end and many of the miners went on to the nearby Arltunga gold fields. Ernestine Hill wrote about the ruby rush in The Territory (1951) and she was not convinced that they were not rubies and called them "Alice Springs rubies" (a distinct variety) and said that, following the collapse of the market, the first prospectors would keep sugar bags full of rubies in their chicken houses for years and give them away by the handful to friends and relations.

== Frederick Fox grave ==
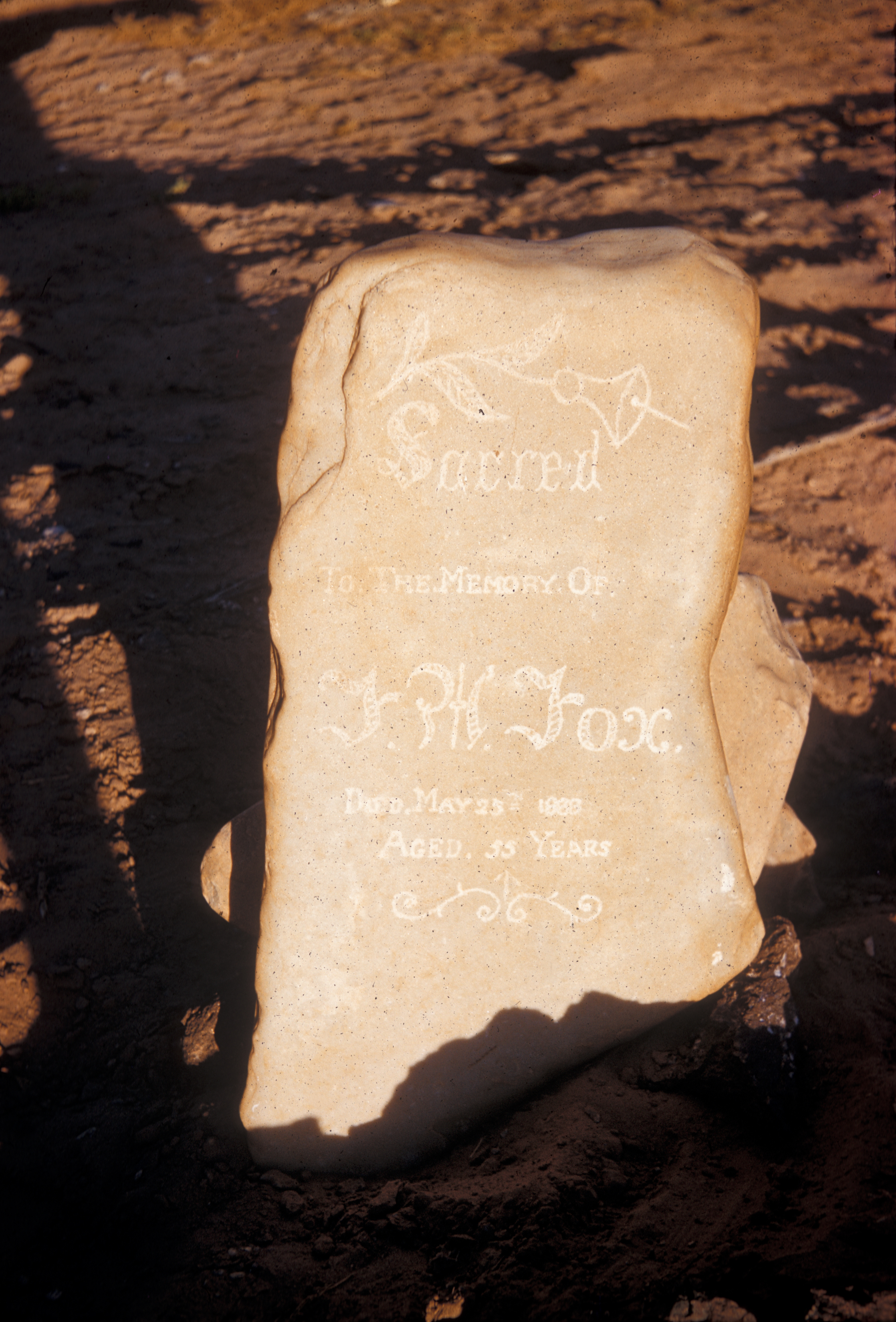
Fox's grave as pictured in the 1960s

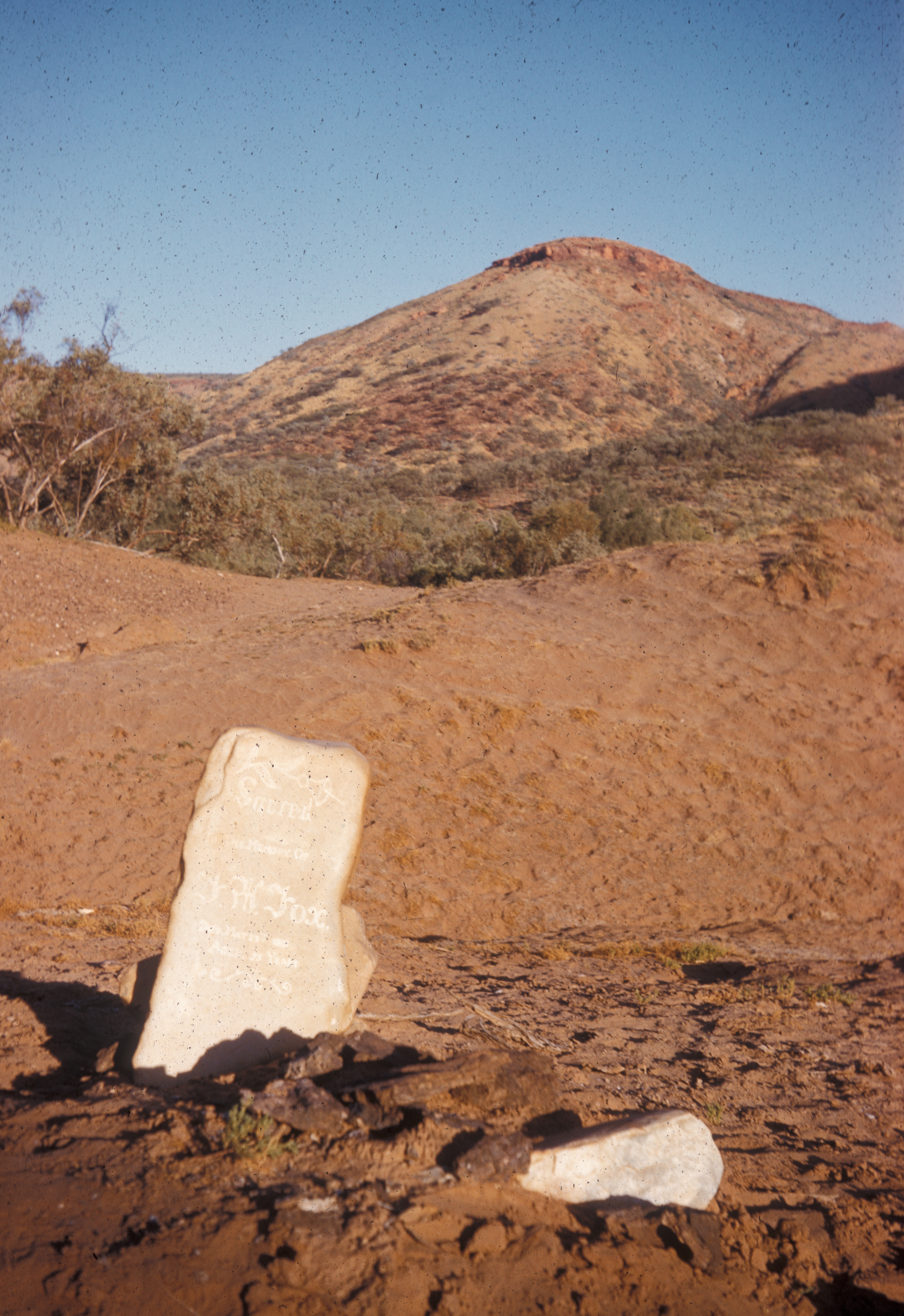
The grave in situ in the 1960s

Within the Ruby Gap Nature Park is the grave of FH Fox, a miner and manager of the MacDonnell Ranges Ruby Mining Company, who died on 25 May 1888; this was the day following the announcement that the rubies had been redefined as garnets. The death was reported to Alice Springs police on 5 June 1888 who listed the cause of death as being from illness; Walter Smith later claimed that, after finding himself destitute Fox had shot himself and that the police were being kind in not saying so.

The grave is colloquially known as "Fox's Grave" and it is the destination of a popular walking track within the park. It is one of the only overt relics of the ruby rush in the region, however, it is likely that the current headstone is not the location of the original gravesite.

The grave reads: "sacred to the memory of FH Fox, died May 25th 1888, aged 55 years".

Others also died in the area during the ruby rush including Achta Mahomed (an Afghan cameleer) on 11 May 1888 and Alexander Murdoch.
