= Gerhardt Johannsen =

Australian builder (1876–1951)

Gerhardt Johannsen in 1909

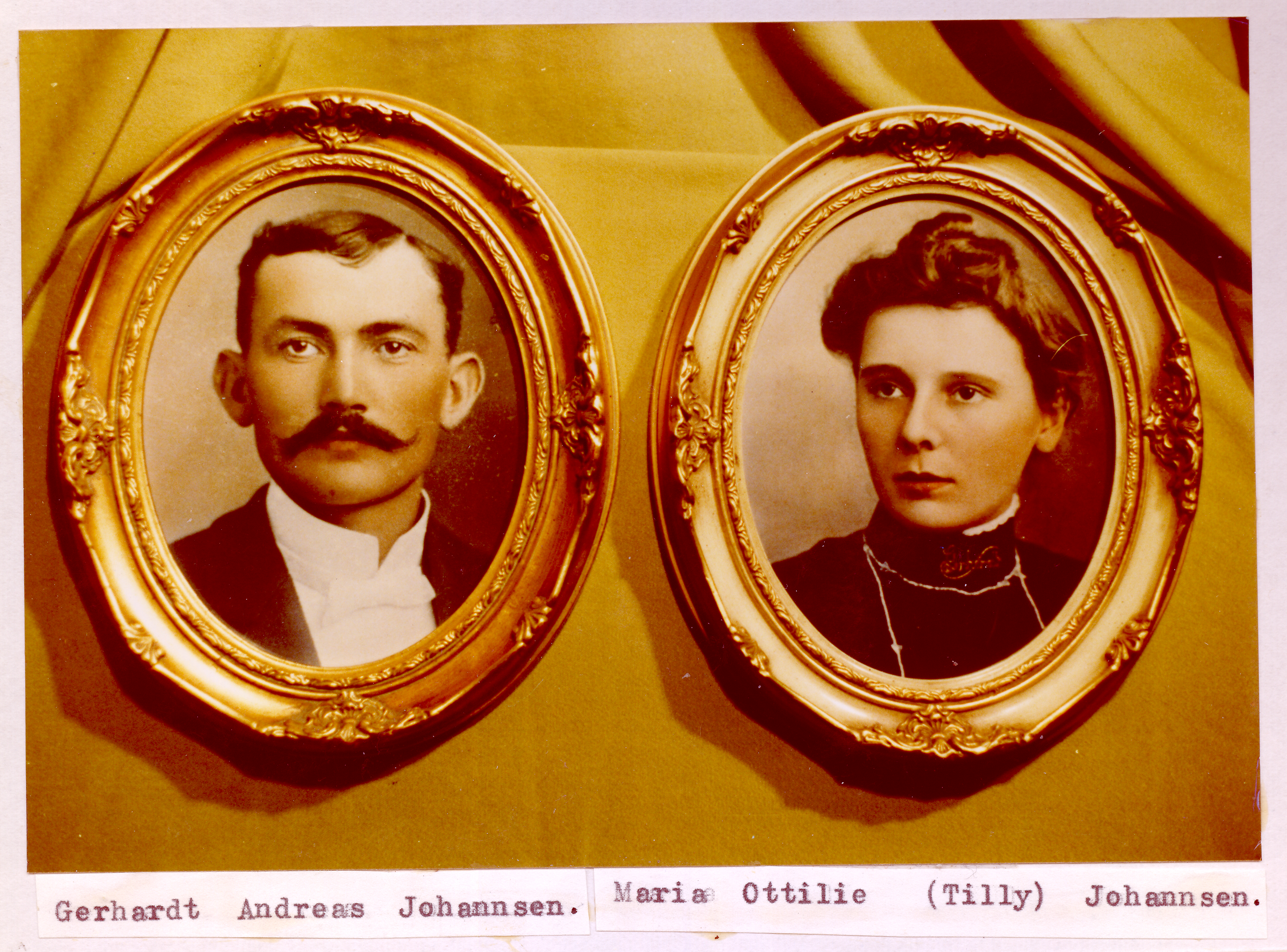
Portrait's of Johannsen and his wife Tilly, date unknown

The Johannsen family at Deep Well, 1927

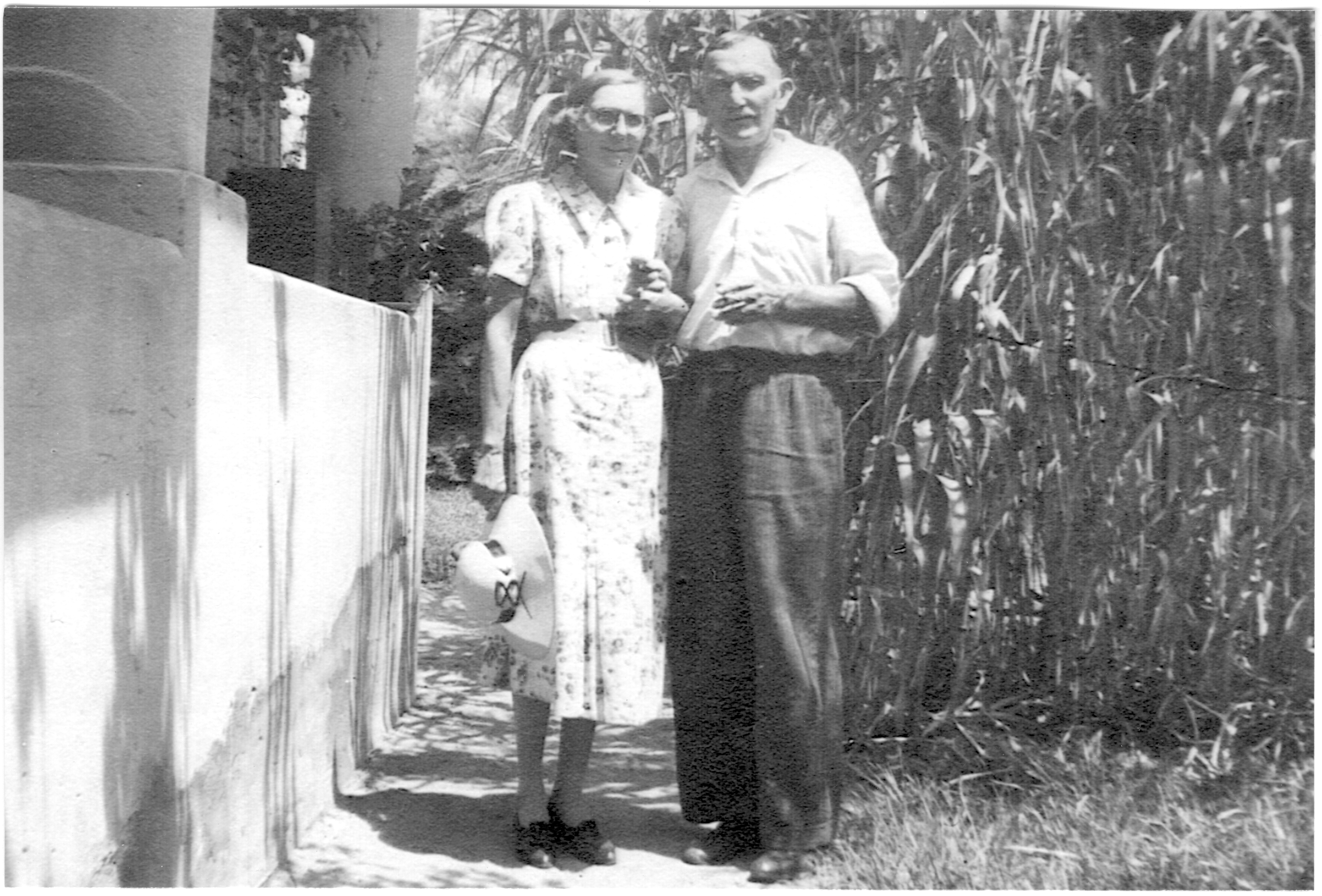
Gerhardt and Tilly Johannsen in Alice Springs, c.1940s

Gerhardt Andreas Johannsen (14 November 1876 – 4 April 1951) was a stonemason, builder and pastoralist in the Northern Territory.

== Early life ==
Johannsen was born in Denmark on 14 November 1876 and, in 1899, he left to emigrate to Australia: working his passage as a crew member. He had originally planned to emigrate to South Africa but the Boer War prevented this.

When he arrived in South Australia he went to the Barossa Valley where he met and married Marie Ottilie (Tilly) Hoffmann in 1905.

In 1909 Johannsen responded the a call for help from the Hermannsburg Mission and the family, which now included a three-year-old daughter Elsa Margaret Johannsen (born 21 June 1906), travelled by horse and buggy to Central Australia.

== Life in the Northern Territory ==
In Hermannsburg Johannsen erected buildings, stockyards and performed general repairs. He was often assisted by and taught Aboriginal men building skills.

In 1911 the family left the mission and moved to Deep Well Station; where Gertrude (Trudy) Ottilie Johannsen (28 August 1912) and then Kurt Gerhardt Johannsen (11 January 1915) were born.

Johannsen sometime left the running of Deep Well to contractors and took building contracts elsewhere, this included sinking wells, building the police buildings at Alice Well and Arltunga (alongside Bill Liddle) and working on the Stuart Town Gaol.

Johannsen also served as a guide to Walter Baldwin Spencer and Leonard Keith Ward during their 1923 visit and, once again hosted Ward and Vilhjalmur Stefansson. Stefansson wanted to compare the arid desert of Central Australia with the Arctic.

Following the sudden death of Carl Strehlow in 1922 Johannsen returned to Hermannsburg to work as the station manager before again returning to Deep Well in 1924. While here Johannsen started a tanning industry and encouraged gardening again. Mona Dora Johannsen (27 October 1923) was born at the Mission.

Central Australia was in the midst of a severe drought and, Johannsen was experiencing poor health and had contracted polio myelitis, so after seeking treatment in Adelaide (where he had to say for 7 months) the family gave up their lease and moved to Alice Springs in 1928. Johannsen's trip to Adelaide was enabled by Sam Irvine, a mail contractor, who made up a canopy bed for him on his truck and looked after him until they were met at the Oodnadatta railhead by Australian Inland Mission sisters who assisted him on the train. However, in these years two additional children were born; Randle Werner Johannsen (10 August 1925) and Myrtle Edna Johannsen (22 November 1926).

In Alice Springs Johannsen built a family house on Todd Street; what is now the site of the National Australia Bank (this was commandeered by the army for nursing sisters' quarters during World War II). Shortly after this Johannsen pioneered the first mail truck to Arltunga, held the government contract for sanitary and garbage services (with his son Kurt), was involved in gold mining at Winnecke and mica mining in the Stranways Ranges; where the family lived during the war.

Following the end of the war the family returned to Alice Springs and Johannsen retired from active bush work; a severe accident at Winnecke strongly contributed to his decision to retire.

== Later life ==
In later life Johannsen was an active member of the Alice Springs Progress Association.

Johannsen died suddenly on 4 April 1951 when he collapsed from a heart attack at the Pioneer Theatre whilst with his wife Marie. His funeral was one of the biggest seen in Alice Springs for many years.
