= William Liddle =

Australian pastoralist (1888–1959)

- Born: 2 December 1888; Angaston, South Australia
- Died: 8 September 1959 (aged 70)

William Hurle Liddle (2 December 1888 – 8 September 1959) was a pastoralist who established Angas Downs Station (now Angus Downs Indigenous Protected Area), in Central Australia, taking up the first pastoral lease in 1929.

== Early life ==
Liddle, of Scottish descent, was born in Angaston, South Australia to Thomas and Matilda Ann Liddle.

== Life in the Northern Territory ==
Liddle came to Alice Springs as a young man, to work at the Alice Springs Telegraph Station, in 1907. This is where he met, and married, Mary Earwaker the daughter of the blacksmith and a local Arrernte woman, in 1912.

Following their marriage (during which they had four children) Liddle worked as a contractor for Gerhardt Johannsen, and constructed many of the stone buildings at Arltunga, including the Arltunga Police Station.

William left Mary in Alice Springs. He then started working at a number of local cattle stations including Maryvale Station, Mount Burrell, Bowson's Hole, Hamilton Downs and finally King's Creek Station before establishing his own station Angas Downs: named for his home town.

Angas Downs, 300 km southwest of Alice Springs, was first visited by Liddle in 1922 when, in dire circumstances, he found water at "Liddle Hills" and built a homestead there. He visited again in 1927 when over-landing 2000 sheep to South Australia. A formal lease was not officially granted until 1929. The Anangu name for this place is Walara.

In 1932 H.H. Finlayson stayed with Liddle at Angas Downs and, although it was his primary purpose of his expedition to study mammals he took many photographs and recordings of Aboriginal people here. Whilst there, Liddle fathered several more children such as Bob Randall. This attracted the attention of the authorities and many of these children were taken to become members of the Stolen Generations.

In 1948 Liddle sold Angas Downs to two of his sons, Arthur and Milton Liddle. The brothers, and their Aboriginal descendants, ran sheep and then cattle until the 1990s when, following financial struggles, they sold to the Imanpa Development Association Inc. and it became the Angas Downs Indigenous Protected Area.
