= Michael Terry (explorer) =

Australian explorer

Michael Terry, FRGS, FRGSA (3 May 1899 – 1981) was an Australian explorer, surveyor, prospector and writer.

== Biography ==
Terry was born at Gateshead, County Durham, England. During the First World War he served with No. 2 Squadron of the RNAS Armoured Cars in Russia against the Bolsheviks, by whom he was captured at Kursk though subsequently released. He moved to Australia in 1918. Between 1923 and 1935 he led fourteen, mainly gold prospecting, expeditions through inland Australia; he wrote several books and articles in Walkabout, about his experiences.

== Bibliography ==
- 1925 – Across Unknown Australia: a thrilling account of exploration in the Northern Territory of Australia. Herbert Jenkins: London
- 1927 – Through a Land of Promise: with gun, car and camera in the heart of Northern Australia. Herbert Jenkins: London
- 1931 – Hidden Wealth and Hiding People. Putnam: London
- 1932 – Untold Miles: three gold-hunting expeditions amongst the picturesque borderland ranges of Central Australia. Selwyn & Blount: London
- 1937 – Sand and Sun: two gold-hunting expeditions with camels in the dry lands of Central Australia. Michael Joseph: London
- 1945 – Bulldozer: the war role of the Department of Main Roads, New South Wales. Frank Johnson: Sydney
- 1974 – War of the Warramullas. Rigby: Adelaide. ISBN 0-85179-790-3
- 1987 – The last explorer: the autobiography of Michael Terry, FRGS, FRGSA. Australian National University Press: Rushcutters Bay, New South Wales. ISBN 0-08-034398-8

== See also ==
- Australian outback literature of the 20th century
- Ben Nicker
