= Ambalindum =

Pastoral lease in the Northern Territory

Coordinates: 23°23′01″S 134°41′03″E

Location in Northern Territory

Ambalindum is a pastoral lease that operates as a cattle station in the Alice Springs region of the Northern Territory.

The property occupies an area of 3,317 square kilometres (1,281 sq mi) and in 2013 was stocked with 5,000 Santa Gertrudis-cross-cattle. The ephemeral Hale River runs through the property.

Gold was discovered in the area in 1887 with the first cattle and sheep stations settled in the early 1900s. Ambalindum was initially settled by George Cavanagh.

In 2017 the owners, Tim and Emily Edmunds, sold their Hale River Pastoral Company including the Ambalindum and Numery leases to a Canadian Pension Fund for over A$50 million. The combined properties occupy a combined area of 7,500 square kilometres (2,896 sq mi) and were stocked with 13,000 head of cattle.

== See also ==
- List of ranches and stations
