= Dick Kimber =

Australian historian

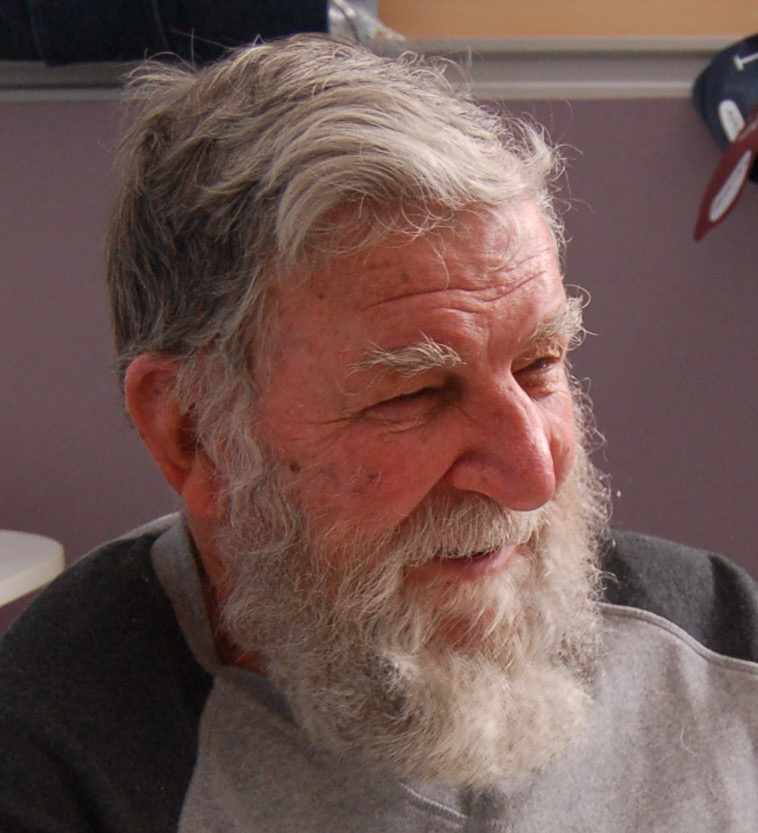

Personal details
- Born: 1939 Freeling in South Australia
- Died: 16 September 2024 (aged 84–85) Alice Springs (Mparntwe)
- Spouse: Margaret Friedel
- Children: 2
- Occupation: Historian

Richard Glyn Kimber (1939 – 16 September 2024) AM was an Australian historian and author who wrote extensively on the history, art, culture and wildlife of Central Australia. He published several books, the best known of which is Man From Arltunga: Walter Smith, Australian Bushman (1986) as well as more than 100 articles and essays. He also gave public lectures and made regular media appearances.

== Early life and education ==
Richard Glyn Kimber was born in 1939 at Freeling in South Australia.

He went to school in the Riverland area and Brighton and then attended the University of Adelaide and Adelaide Teacher's College.

== Career ==
Throughout Kimber's career, his focus was on historical research, Aboriginal art and culture, and wildlife. He published several books, the best known of which is Man From Arltunga: Walter Smith, Australian Bushman (1986); this book tells the life story of Walter Smith and this book was based on hours of tape-recordings and shared travelling experiences between 1981 and 1983.

Kimber moved to Alice Springs in 1970 and taught English, history, social science and Aboriginal Studies at Alice Springs High School. In 1974 he became the first Sacred Sites Officer in the Northern Territory for the Sacred Sites Authority, before returning to teaching. From 1976 to 1978 he was the Papunya Tula Artists Coordinator and devised Aboriginal Studies materials for schools, after which he again returned to teaching. Beginning in 1976 Kimber undertook research and prepared submissions for land rights and native title claims for over twenty years, in a private capacity and for the Central Land Council and Ngaanyatjarra Council. During this time he also undertook research for the Australian Institute of Aboriginal And Torres Strait Islander Studies, the Department of Aboriginal Affairs, the Australian Heritage Commission and the Strehlow Research Centre, regarding locations of Aboriginal homelands and their needs, settlement history, and ownership of sacred objects.

He researched the historical records of extinct and rare native fauna for the Conservation Commission of the Northern Territory and provided advice regarding the development of the Alice Springs Desert Park and issues relating to Aboriginal land ownership of various parks and reserves.

From the mid-1990s, Kimber advised the National Museum of Australia, Museum Victoria and the Northern Territory Museum regarding Aboriginal artefacts and cultural practices, access to Papunya Tula paintings that incorporated sacred elements, and the return of sacred objects to traditional custodians in central Australia. He consulted for Museum Victoria and the Strehlow Research Centre. His recollections of working with Aboriginal ceremonial collections were recorded by Dr Phillip Batty and Dr Jason Gibson.

Since arriving in Central Australia Kimber undertook travels, discussions and other shared experiences with many Aboriginal people, primarily in the south-western Simpson Desert, western deserts of Central Australia and the deserts of Western Australia through to the Canning Stock Route, and in Alice Springs. He privately researched significant historical figures in inland Australia, Australian language usage, and native fauna of the inland including birds, and made important contributions to the Australian National Dictionary and the Australian Dictionary of Biography. and the Northern Territory Dictionary of Biography.

He became friends with and learnt much from artist and community leader Wenten Rubuntja.

== Other activities ==
Kimber gave public lectures and made regular media appearances.

== Recognition and honours ==
Kimber was awarded an Order of Australia in 2001 for "services to the community through research projects and the recording of information of national interest in the areas of history, anthropology, Aboriginal art, ecology and land management practices in Central Australia".

He was awarded a Doctor of Letters, Honoris Causa from the Charles Darwin University in 2006.

== Personal life ==
Kimber married scientist Margaret Friedel in 1975, and they had two children. In 1980, Kimber resigned from the Education Department, "becoming Alice Springs' first publicly acknowledged 'house-husband'" while continuing his active writing life.

He was passionate about Australian Rules Football, lifesaving, as well as history. He was the foundation captain and coach of the Melanka AFL Football Club (now West Football Club).

== Death and legacy ==
Kimber died on 16 September 2024 after a long illness and, after his death Steve Morton stated that: "[h]e was a great historian. He knew more about Central Australian history than anybody else that I know".

The National Library of Australia established the RG Kimber Collection for his correspondence and records; these include his correspondences with David Nash (between 1979 and 2016) and Libby Robin (1999-2001).

== Works ==
- 1988 - Wildbird dreaming: aboriginal art from the central deserts of Australia Nadine Amadio and Richard Kimber
- 1986 - Man from Arltunga: Walter Smith, Australian bushman republished 1990
- 1990 - Ancestor spirits: aspects of Australian Aboriginal life and spirituality by Max Charlesworth, Richard Kimber and Noel Wallace
- 1990 - Friendly country - friendly people : an exhibition of Aboriginal artworks from the peoples of the Tanami and Great Sandy Deserts : desert lands, desert peoples, desert art
- 1990 - Hunter-gatherer demography: the recent past in Central Australia
- 1991 - The end of the bad old days: European settlement in Central Australia, 1871-1894
- 2000 - M. N. Tjapaltjarri
- 2006 - Colliding worlds: first contact in the Western Desert 1932-1984, edited by Philip Batty with essays by Dick Kimber, Jeremy Long and John Kean
