= Arltunga Historical Reserve =

Protected area in the Northern Territory, Australia

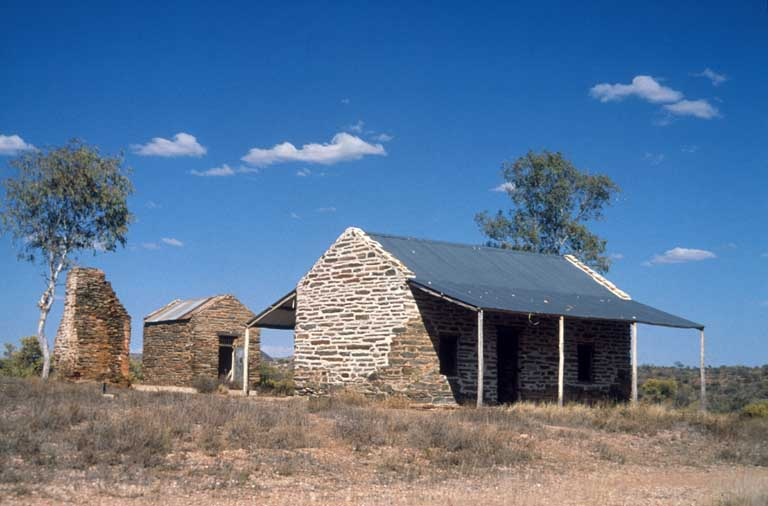
- The Arltunga Gaol at the Arltunga Historical Reserve

- Location within Northern Territory
- Location: Northern Territory, Hart
- Coordinates: 23°26′51″S 134°43′02″E
- Governing body: Parks and Wildlife Commission of the Northern Territory

Arltunga Historical Reserve, known also as Arnerre-ntyenge is a deserted gold rush town located in the Northern Territory of Australia in the locality of Hart about 110 kilometres (68 mi) east of Alice Springs. It is on the lands of the Eastern Arrernte people, who are the traditional owners.

The name Arltunga comes from the Eastern Arrernte name for the nearby waterhole Arnerre-ntyenge (a-na-ra n-tunga-a) which translates roughly as 'stinking water' as animals were known to get stuck in there and die. Alternatively there is speculation that the name comes from a corruption of the Kukatja dialect (Luritja language) word aldolanga which means 'easterners'. The European name for this waterhole is Paddy's Rockhole.

It is of major historical significance as the first major European settlement in Central Australia.

It is nearby to the Winnecke Goldfield which followed a similar history.

== The Eastern Arrernte owners ==
The Eastern Arrernte people are the traditional owners of what is now known as the Arltunga Historical Reserve; their name for this place is Arnerre-ntyenge. This site sits within the estate known as Inerentye and this has been their Country for thousands of years.

Once European settlers arrived the Eastern Arrernte people were important to their success and survival and many Aboriginal people believed that, in helping the prospectors, they would retain some form of independence. The Eastern Arrernte people acted at guides, trackers, labourers, miners, messengers and as domestic help within the community. The Eastern Arrernte also taught the new arrivals knowledge of their Country, particularly in regard to water and bush food resources.

Many Eastern Arrernte people also took work on nearby pastoral stations including Atnarpa, Loves Creek, Ambalindum and The Gardens.

== Mining ==
Gold was first observed here by South Australian explorer, David Lindsay in 1887 as he trekked from Port Darwin to the coast of South Australia and it was found in the creek sands below Paddy's Rockhole (Arnerre-ntyenge). The discovery of gold came after his 1886 discoveries of 'rubies' at Ruby Gap (now Ruby Gap Nature Park); these were later discovered to be high quality garnets.

Subsequently, miners flocked to the area and Arltunga became the first substantial European settlement in Central Australia and, to support Arltunga, Lindsay was commissioned to survey the town of Stuart (now Alice Springs) in so that it could supply it with the required goods.

In 1898 the South Australian Government built the Government Battery and Cyanide Works and construction of these was supervised by James Gilbert Woolcock, who had to overcome significant logistical problems. The following year, in 1899, the police station and associated outbuildings were built by contractors William Hurle Liddle and Gerhardt Johannsen.

Despite high investment the growth of Arltunga was slowed by a significant period of drought in the 1890s where wells dried up and the horses were too starving to cart ore. There was also a period of several months in 1901 when the battery burst and no ore could be crushed for several months. Conditions, however, improved in 1903 when a rush at the nearby Winnecke Goldfield renewed interest in the region and in 1905 a new well, store and hotel were built there. At the turn of the century the population on the field was between 350 and 400 people.

Discoveries of gold in The Granites and Tennant Creek in the late 1920s and early 1930s meant that many of the miners left Arltunga, who still faced regular issues accessing water. The population had declined to 25 by 1933.

== Mission ==
The Little Flower Mission, run by the Missionaries of the Sacred Heart order, moved to Arltunga (by then largely abandoned) in 1944 and was renamed Arltunga Mission. The mission, which had previously been operating in Alice Springs, was moved due to the growing Army presence in the region. Much of the work to complete this move was done by lay missionary Francis McGarry who had also chosen the site; soon after the move was completed McGarry resigned or was asked to leave.

It was moved to again to Phillipson's Block in 1953 where it was renamed Santa Teresa Mission (this is now known the community of Ltyentye Apurte).

== Recent history ==
Arltunga Historical Reserve was established in 1975 and comprises 5,000 ha. Owing to the harshness of the climate and the fact that local stone was used in the construction of buildings, the town is well preserved.

The reserve was nominated for heritage listing in 2008. While the Government Battery and Cyanide Works site at Arltunga was successfully listed in 1995, the nomination for the rest of the reserve was unresolved due to a native title claim in the area until 2014, when a second nomination was successful.

The reserve was listed on the former Register of the National Estate.

== Gallery ==
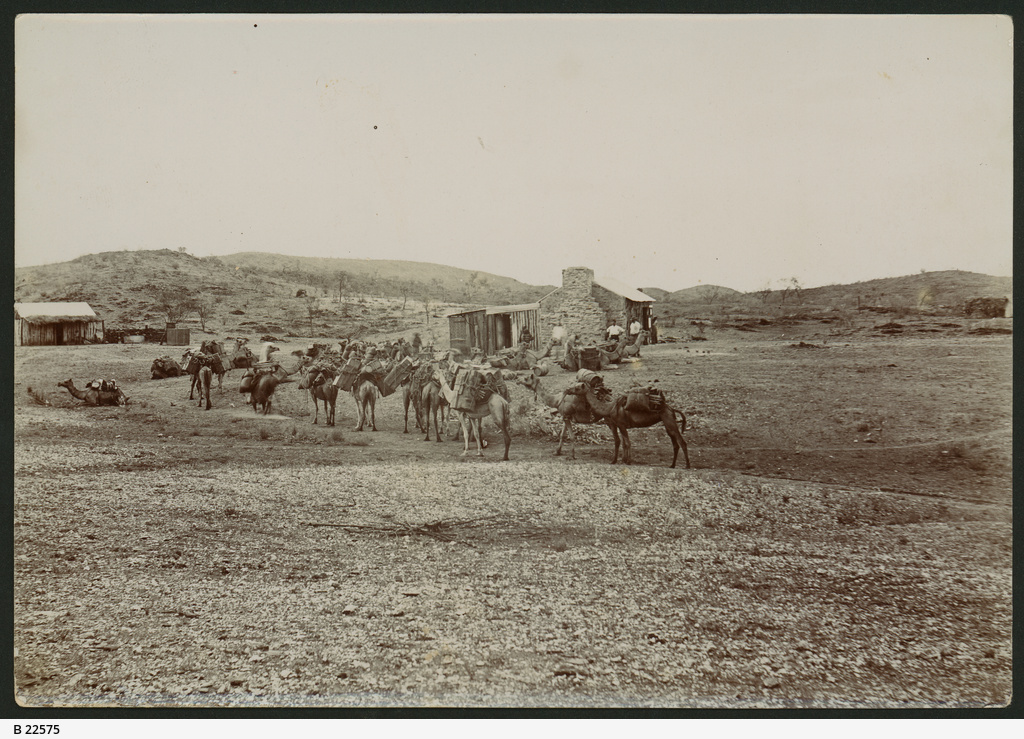
Camel Teams, Arltunga, c. 1898

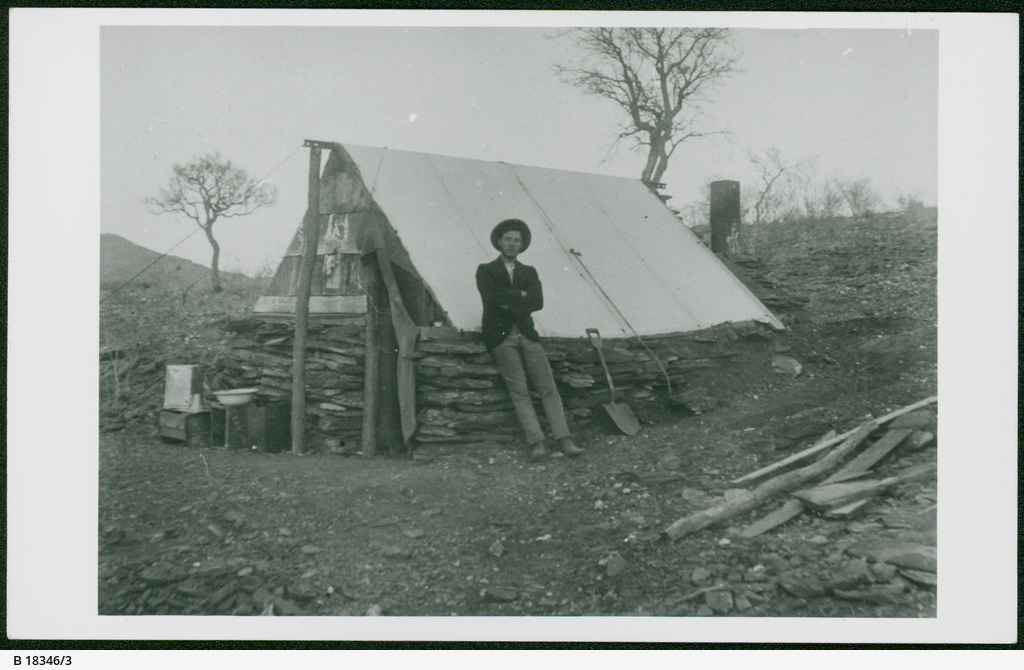
A tent dwelling, Arltunga, c. 1898

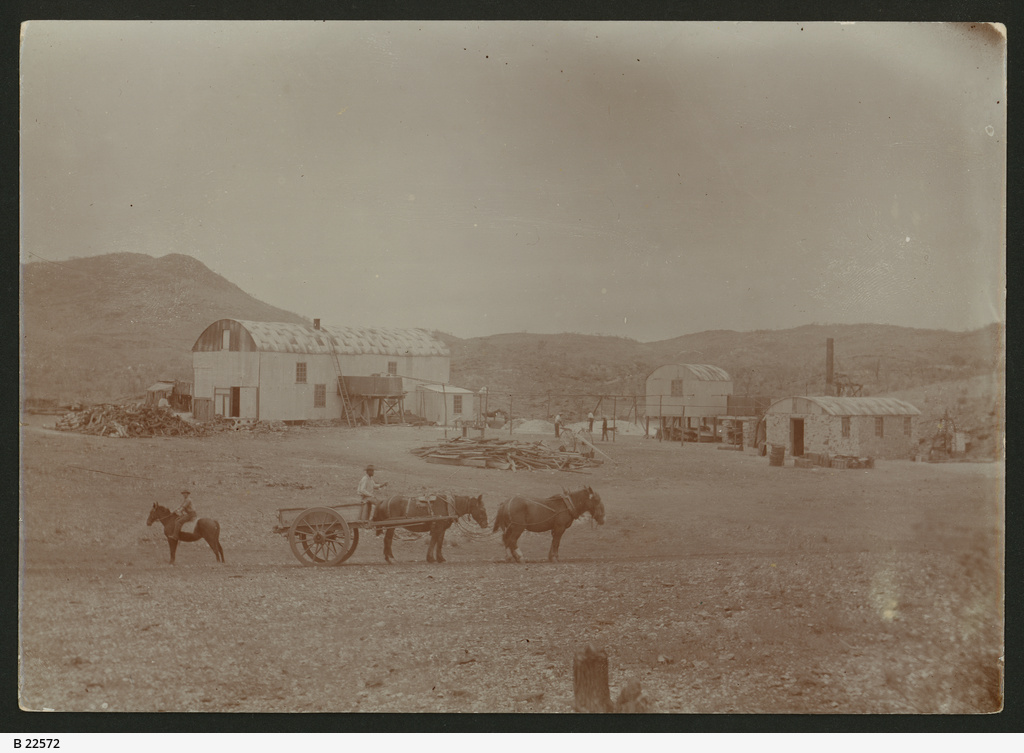
Cyanide Works, Arltunga, c. 1890

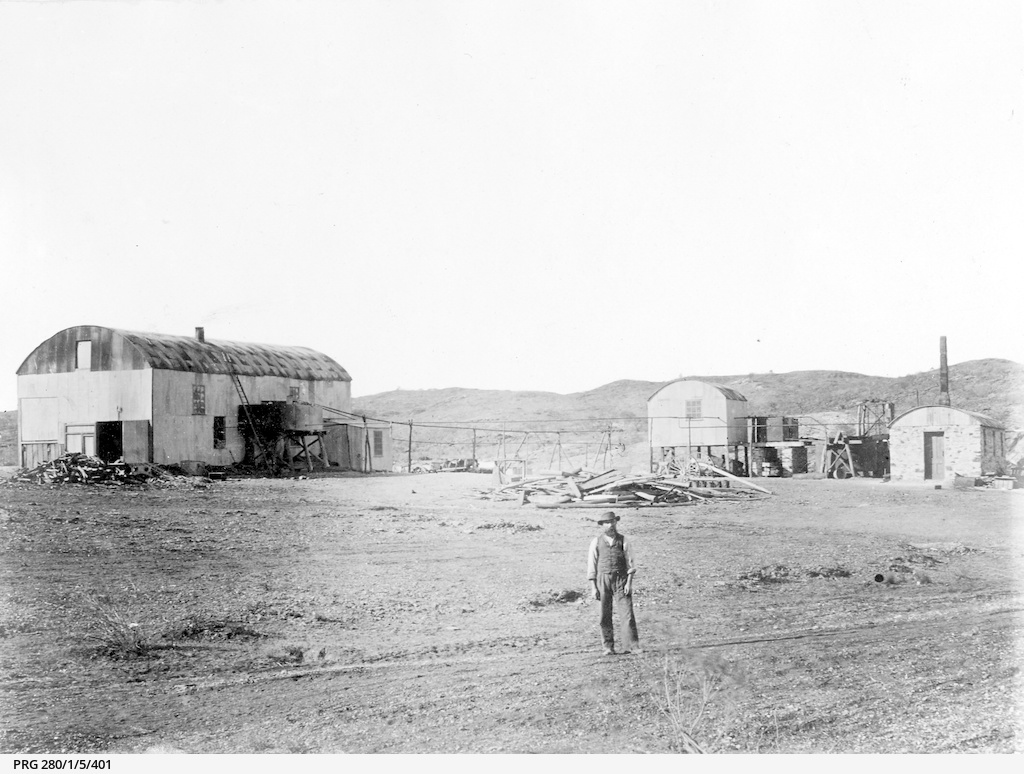
The Government Battery, Arltunga, 1900

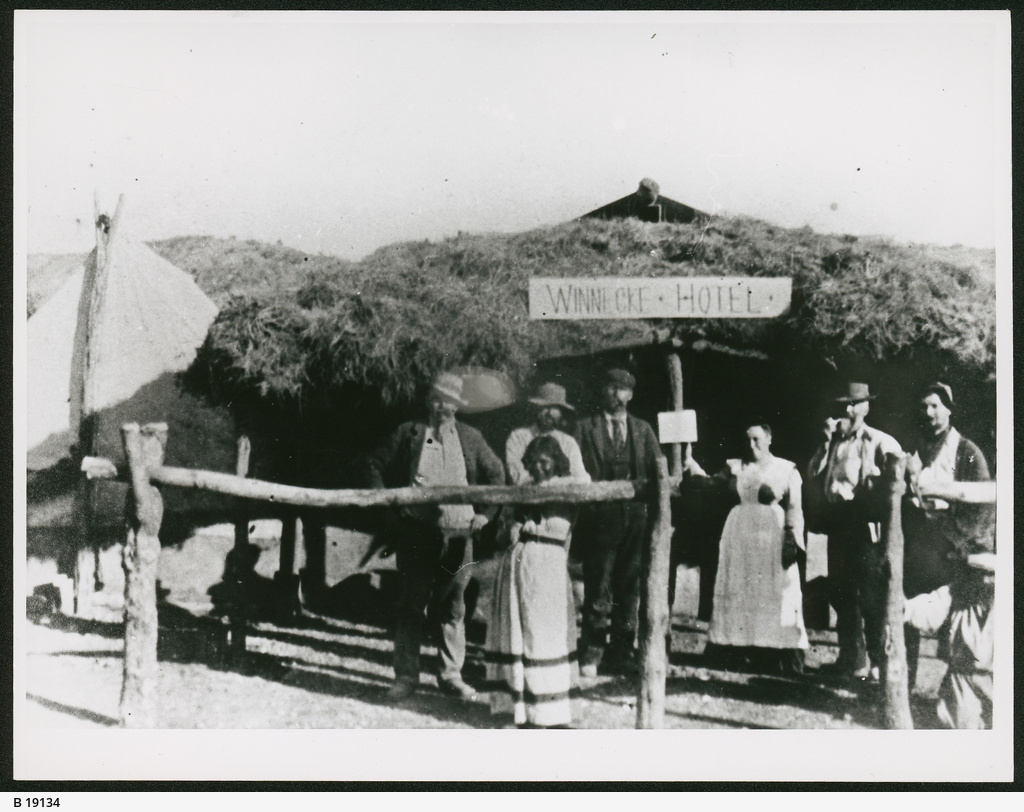
Winnecke Hotel, Arltunga, 1905

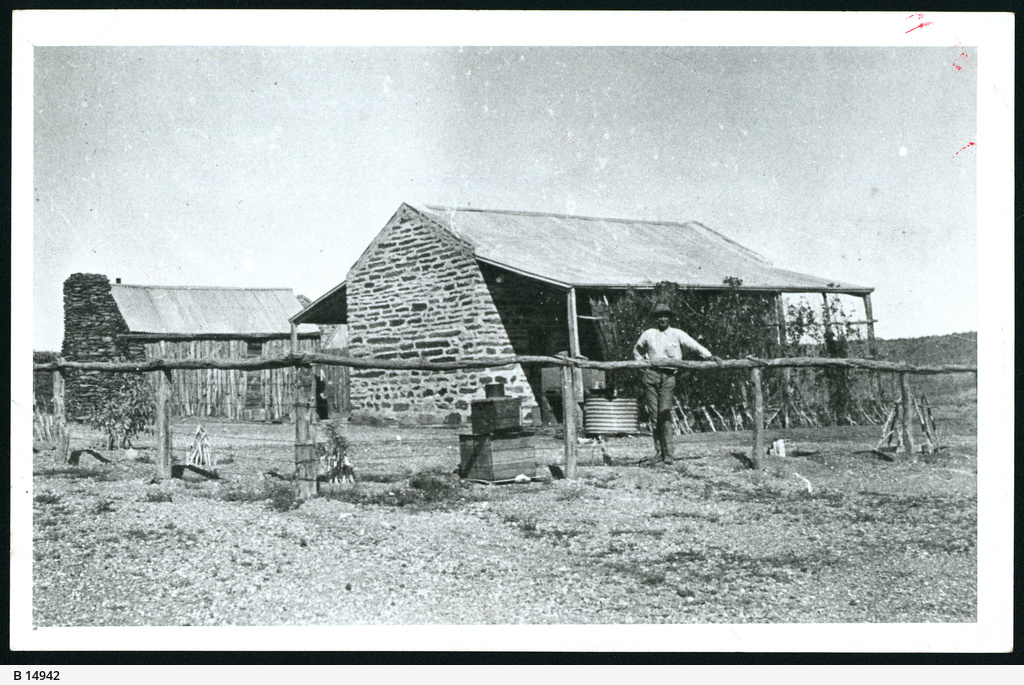
Police Station, Arltunga, 1920

The road into Arltunga, with a Bond's Tour bus, 1946

Further images are available within the Arltunga Collection at the State Library of South Australia.

== Notable people ==
- Chinese market gardener Ah Hong made many trips to Arltunga with vegetables and fresh food for the miners.
- Bushman, Ben Nicker, was born just north of the Arltunga goldfields.
- Gwoya Tjungurrayi and his family escaped to the Arltunga region following the Coniston massacre and he later worked as a gold miner there.
- Hetty Perkins, who worked at The Bungalow for many years, was born at Arltunga.
- Topsy Smith, alongside her husband William "Bill" Smith, spent many years at the Arltunga Goldfields; her son Walter Smith also spent much of his early life there.
- Policeman William George Murray was transferred to Arltunga in 1931 following the events of the Coniston massacre. Here he was appointed as the Mining Warden and later, in 1936, the health inspector. In 1937 he was investigated for the illegal selling of government property and was later acquitted in court; following this incident he was transferred to Roper River in 1938.

== Cemeteries ==
There are two cemeteries that sit within the Arltunga Historical Reserve:

- Crossroads Cemetery
- White Range Cemetery

== Climate ==
Climate data for Arltunga, elevation 661 m (2,169 ft), (2000–2020 normals, extremes 2000–present)
Month	Jan	Feb	Mar	Apr	May	Jun	Jul	Aug	Sep	Oct	Nov	Dec	Year
Record high °C (°F)	43.9 (111.0)	43.7 (110.7)	41.6 (106.9)	39.0 (102.2)	33.4 (92.1)	30.2 (86.4)	30.4 (86.7)	35.0 (95.0)	39.0 (102.2)	41.0 (105.8)	42.5 (108.5)	44.5 (112.1)	44.5 (112.1)
Mean daily maximum °C (°F)	36.2 (97.2)	34.7 (94.5)	32.4 (90.3)	29.1 (84.4)	23.2 (73.8)	19.5 (67.1)	20.2 (68.4)	23.0 (73.4)	27.8 (82.0)	31.3 (88.3)	33.8 (92.8)	34.7 (94.5)	28.8 (83.9)
Mean daily minimum °C (°F)	22.3 (72.1)	21.1 (70.0)	18.6 (65.5)	13.4 (56.1)	8.1 (46.6)	4.3 (39.7)	3.1 (37.6)	4.7 (40.5)	10.2 (50.4)	14.3 (57.7)	18.1 (64.6)	20.4 (68.7)	13.2 (55.8)
Record low °C (°F)	10.0 (50.0)	8.6 (47.5)	6.9 (44.4)	1.5 (34.7)	−4.2 (24.4)	−5.0 (23.0)	−6.5 (20.3)	−5.0 (23.0)	−0.9 (30.4)	0.0 (32.0)	6.6 (43.9)	7.5 (45.5)	−6.5 (20.3)
Average rainfall mm (inches)	65.0 (2.56)	57.8 (2.28)	33.6 (1.32)	18.6 (0.73)	18.5 (0.73)	14.0 (0.55)	9.2 (0.36)	4.4 (0.17)	10.5 (0.41)	23.4 (0.92)	32.9 (1.30)	52.6 (2.07)	340.5 (13.4)
Average rainy days (≥ 1.0 mm)	4.3	3.7	2.1	1.2	1.9	1.5	1.2	0.8	1.5	2.8	4.0	5.3	30.3
Source: Australian Bureau of Meteorology
