= Walter Smith (bushman) =

Personal details
- Born: Walter Smith; 2 July 1898 Arltunga, Northern Territory, Australia
- Died: 14 June 1990 (aged 91) Alice Springs, Northern Territory, Australia
- Occupation: Bushman

Walter Smith also known as Walter Purula (Perrurle) or Wati Yuritja (2 July 1898 – 14 June 1990) was a legendary Australian bushman from the Arltunga region in the Northern Territory of Australia. Wati Yuritja translates as man of the Water Dreaming).

He was also a miner, dogger and perhaps the most widely travelled cameleer in Australia who could speak more than 30 languages.

== Early life ==
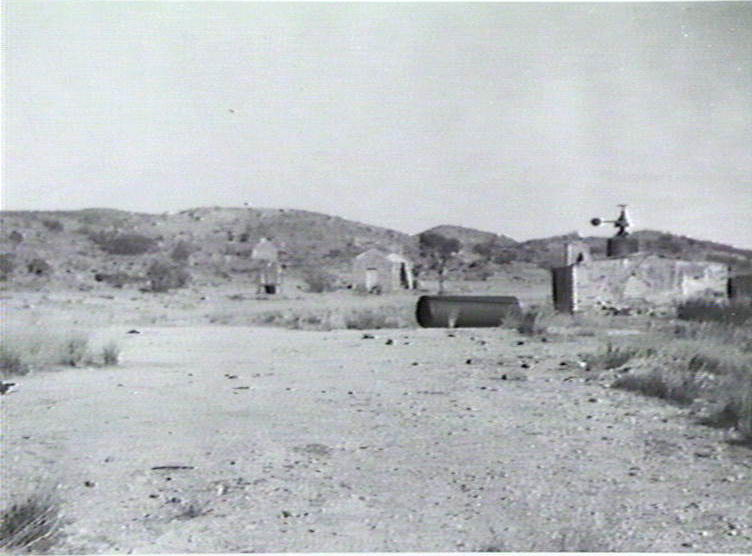
Arltunga Historical Reserve

Smith was born at the Arltunga goldfield and was the eldest of eleven children to William Smith, a goldminer of Welsh descent and an Aboriginal woman Topsy White (Topsy Smith). Although he had no formal education, his father taught him English and his mother and grandmother taught him eastern Arrernte and Arabana languages. Smith spent his childhood in the small mining community, primarily in the company of other Aboriginal children; it was here he learnt to gather bush foods and honed his tracking and direction-finding skills. He recalled the first arrival of rabbits in the region which he, and the other Aboriginal children called 'Arintja' or 'Devil'; they were initially afraid of the unfamiliar creatures but soon started catching them to eat.

At the age of 12, in 1910, he accompanied Arrernte people on their last large ceremonial gathering in the Simpson Desert. They travelled with camels to a large clay-pan, where traditional hunting and gathering took place. After severe drought in 1914-15 drought and the 1919 influenza ceremonial gatherings took place on the desert-fringe cattle stations or at the edges of outback towns instead.

== Working life ==
Smith started work as a young man, between the ages of 12 and 14, and his first jobs involved working with horses with Ben Webb and then Joe Harding; while in the employ of Joe Harding he assisted in the move of a mob of cattle up to Pine Creek, a distance of 2000 kms.

After the death of his father in 1914, Smith's family moved to Alice Springs with the help of the Hayes family of Undoolya station and police sergeant Robert Stott. In Alice Walter lived with his mother at The Bungalow, a ‘half-caste’ institution. Smith, devastated by the loss of his father, wanted to stay with his mother and family and attend school with his siblings, but Robert Stott said he was a young man and it was better for his to get a job and he began working as an off-sider to Charlie Sadadeen. Together they would meet the train at the railhead at Oodnadatta in South Australia, and take a load to Alice Springs with a camel team under the employ of Wallis and Co. [Company]. Smith spent many years with Sadadeen and remembers him growing opium flowers out the front of his house at 'Sadadeen Swamp' which they would boil up together; he recalls the local police thinking they were pretty flowers and having no idea of their use. They would work together for around 15 years.

Smith married Millie Carnegie on 11 February 1929 at the Oodnadatta police station. While he was away on a prospecting journey to the western deserts, government officials removed Millie to Nepabunna Mission in the Flinders Ranges. Smith never saw her again.

In 1931 Smith joined the Eclipse Gold Expedition which left from Oodnadatta after being asked by Harry Hartley. Smith originally thought this was a legitimate gold seeking expedition and was surprised to learn that, although gold would be welcome, it was actually a search for Harold Bell Lasseter and his "lost reef". They would soon learn that this would be a, successful, search for his remains. Smith claims, on this trip, to have buried Lasseter for the third time, he was first buried by the Pitjantjatjara people (in a shallow oval grave) and then by Bob Buck who Smith said had not dug deep enough as; "dingoes had dug down and dragged a leg off".

He then worked as a prospector, gem fossicker, dogger (dingo trapper) and miner at Tennant Creek during the 1930s. He took out several mining leases in the Harts Range.

He also collected meteorites and fossils from the Simpson Desert for museums who would pay for them; in this role he was known as ‘Sandhill Bob’; this was a name 'borrowed' from Alurrpa Pananga.

== Later life ==
Smith married Mabel Williams in Alice Springs on 26 January 1961. He was the last of the Red Centre’s cameleers, working into the 1970s.

After living with his sister Ada Wade for many years, he then moved to the Old Timers’ Home in 1983.

He died on 14 June 1990 and is buried in the Alice Springs Cemetery.

== Legacy ==
Smith's life story is recorded in Dick Kimber's book "Man from Arltunga: Walter Smith, Australian bushman" (1986). This book is based on many hours of tape recording that Kimber and Smith made between 1981 and 1983. Of him Kimber writes:

Although Walter does not consider himself as a legendary character, many of his experiences are illustrative of the legendary outback figure of folk-lore

— RG (Dick) Kimber, Man from Arltunga
