= Margaret Friedel =

Australian scientist

- Education: University of Melbourne; Murdoch University
- Scientific career
- Fields: Ecology
- Workplaces: CSIRO

Dr. Margaret Hilda Friedel is an Australian rangeland (arid lands) ecology and management researcher, widely cited nationally and internationally for her work on the concept of ecosystem thresholds and her collaborative research with landholders and communities in outback Australia to foster understanding of the nature of rangeland ecosystems and how to balance commercial production with maintenance of a fragile resource base.

Friedel's research is focussed on Australian rangelands from social, ecological and production perspectives, and the human-environment nexus in arid and semi-arid lands. Her research work has included collaborative scenario making to test regional development options for arid land communities, mainly in the Northern Territory. She is also known for her research into the sustainable management of buffell grass – a species useful for pastoral meat production but disadvantageous ecologically as it is invasive and out-competes native grasses.

Friedel is an Honorary Fellow at CSIRO Ecosystem Sciences' laboratory in Alice Springs, Australia and a member of the Alice Springs Regional Weed Reference Group. She is an adjunct professor at the Charles Darwin University in Alice Springs.

== Background ==
Friedel attained a Bachelor of Science in 1967 followed by a Doctor of Philosophy, both from the University of Melbourne, Australia. In 1978, Friedel was awarded a Diploma of Education from Murdoch University, Australia.

In 1974, Friedel joined Commonwealth Scientific and Industrial Research Organisation (CSIRO) in Alice Springs initially researching pasture productivity and nutrient cycling in rangelands production systems. Her research expanded to encompass arid land ecology and management, with a focus on woody plant dynamics, fire as a management tool and ground-based rangeland monitoring.

In 1985–1986, Friedel researched similar issues in South Africa and later, from 2000 to 2004, ran a collaborative study in Rajasthan, India using remote sensing to assess land degradation.

The year 1995 marked the beginning of Friedel's involvement in community-based planning and integrated approaches to regional development that incorporate economic, social and ecological values.

== Publications ==
A selection of Friedel's publications are as follows:

- A. C. Grice; H. T. Murphy; J. R. Clarkson; M. H. Friedel; C. S. Fletcher; D. A. Westcott (2020) A review and refinement of the concept of containment for the management of invasive plants. Australian Journal of Botany. Australian Journal of Botany 68(8) 602-616. DOI.org/10.1071/BT20092
- Margaret H. Friedel; Stephen R. Morton (2022) A history of CSIRO’S Central Australian Laboratory, 1: 1953–80: pastoral land research. Historical Records of Australian Science. 2022-11-07 DOI: 10.1071/HR22006
- Margaret Friedel; Allan, Grant; Duguid, Angus (2014) Do we know enough about vegetation dynamics to manage fire regimes in central Australia? Ecological Management & Restoration Volume 15, Issue 2 p. 128-132.

== Awards ==
- 1996 - Outstanding Achievement Award, US Society for Range Management, 1996
- 2007 - Friedel was awarded the Australian Public Service Medal for outstanding public service in the field of arid zone research.
- 2007 - The Desert Knowledge Research Award was presented to Friedel at the Northern Territory Research and Innovation Awards.
- 2013 - Awarded a Professorial Fellow at Charles Darwin University.
- 2017 - Awarded a Fellow of the Australian Rangeland Society in 2017.
- 2019 - Awarded a Professorial Fellow at Charles Darwin University.

== Public lectures ==
Friedel delivered The 2013 Rangeland Journal Lecture on the topic of "A million years of change: wind, flood and fire in the Simpson Desert", the origin and development of the Simpson Desert.

== Achievements ==
- Contributing Author, Working Group II "Impacts, Adaptations and Mitigation of Climate Change: Scientific-Technical Analyses", Inter-governmental Panel on climate Change, Second Assessment Report 2002
- President, Australian Rangeland Society, 1981–82
- Research Fellowship, South African Department of Agriculture and Water Supply, 1985–86
- Chair of Publications Committee, Australian Rangeland Society, 1988–95
- Chair of International Continuing Committee for Rangeland Congresses, 1995–99
- Member of International Continuing Committee for Rangeland Congresses from 1991 to 1999
- Member of Federal Government State of Environment Land Resources Reference Group as a specialist on arid Australia, 1994–96
- Advisory Editor, The Rangeland Journal
- Member of the Grassland Society of Southern Africa
