= Kurt Johannsen =

Australian bush mechanic and inventor (1915–2002)

Kurt Gerhardt Johannsen (11 January 1915 – 23 January 2002) was an Australian bush mechanic and inventor who developed the world's first commercial road train. He was also an aviator, fencing contractor, labourer, mailman and miner and known a "true son of the Red Centre", referring to the southern desert region of the Northern Territory in Australia.

== Early life ==
Johannsen was born at Deep Well Station, 80 km south of Alice Springs, to Gerhardt and Ottilie Johannsen. Gerhardt had emigrated from Denmark and Ottilie was of German descent and the family often experienced discrimination throughout Kurt's childhood, the period in between the two world wars, and Gerhardt was often referred to as "The German" or "The Hun".

In 1922, when Johannsen was 7, the family moved to Hermannsburg Mission Station where Gerhardt worked as the station manager; this was following the sudden death of Pastor Carl Strehlow in October 1922. The family remained there until 1924 before returning to Deep Well. However, in Deep Well, all was not well with Central Australia being in the midst of a harsh drought and both of his parents experiencing ill health, so, in 1928, the family abandoned the station and moved in to Alice Springs, which was then called Stuart.

== Working life ==
Johannsen acquired his first driving license at 11 when living at Deep Well and, after finishing his schooling at 15 in Alice Springs, he was driving his own truck and held the government contract for sanitary and garbage services in the town; as he was underage this contract was cosigned by his father and brother-in-law Bill Petrick.

In 1932 he took on an additional contract as a mail contractor for the region east of Alice Springs and the mail run extended to: Alcoota, Ambalindum, Arltunga, Claraville, Delny, MacDonald Downs, Mount Riddock, Mount Swan, Waite River and Winnecke. One story told about Johannsen around this period is that he once broke an axle when far from assistance and managed to fix it well enough to get back to town using a mulga tree and a knife.

Over the following years Johannsen had many roles and was involved in many exploits before, in 1936, starting on his most remembered innovation, the 'Bitzer' Mulga Express which was designed to be able to haul more as well as handle the bad roads around Central Australia; and, in the early years, was quite an unexpected sight. Over the following years the 'Bitzer' Mulga Express was followed by the 'Bitzer' Mulga Express II and III, the 'Bitzer' Mulga Express III was able to haul an unheard of 22 tonnes.

Between mail runs and driving his truck Johannsen prospected extensively and was also involved in various tourism ventures with Australian Expeditions (with Monty Embury) and Bond's Tours. During World War II Johannsen moved to Tennant Creek and opened a garage where he created a wood-gas producer that converted wood into gas to run the motor; it consumed about 1 kg of wood for every km.

The post-war period was one of boom for Johannsen who, with the help of financing offered to him by a pastoralist, was able to purchase many trucks and other mechanical items from army disposal sales and with these vehicles was able to construct the world's first road train, with three self tracking trailers, using a Diamond T980 truck which he named 'Bertha'. These trucks were then used for all kinds of freight but were especially useful for cattle transport which changed the way farming was done as truck transport was better for stock then droving and the cattle arrived in the yards in better condition and therefore fetched higher prices; this also meant that younger cattle could be sold. As this was a new invention some pastoralists were hesitant to make use of the new technology.

Of his invention Johannsen said it was a long held dream:

I think the idea of the self-tracking trailers for my road trains, which I built after World War II, originated in my imagination when I was about 10 years old. I loved to make all sorts of weird contraptions out of tin lids, kerosene boxes and other bits and pieces and hooked my models together with two, three, and sometimes four trailers with wire towbars around bent nails. I pulled them around with a piece of string or a stick.

— Kurt Johannsen, A son of the Red Centre, 1993

Johannsen also made a series of other inventions and the details of some of these are available through Library & Archives NT.

== Later life ==
Johannsen retired from mining and transporting in 1980 and purchased a small hobby farm in Yankalilla, South Australia. In 1992 he published his autobiography: "A son of 'the red centre': memoirs and anecdotes of the life of a road train pioneer and bush inventor of the Northern Territory of Australia".

Johannsen was inducted into the Shell Rimula Wall of Fame in 2000. He died on 23 January 2002.

== Gallery ==
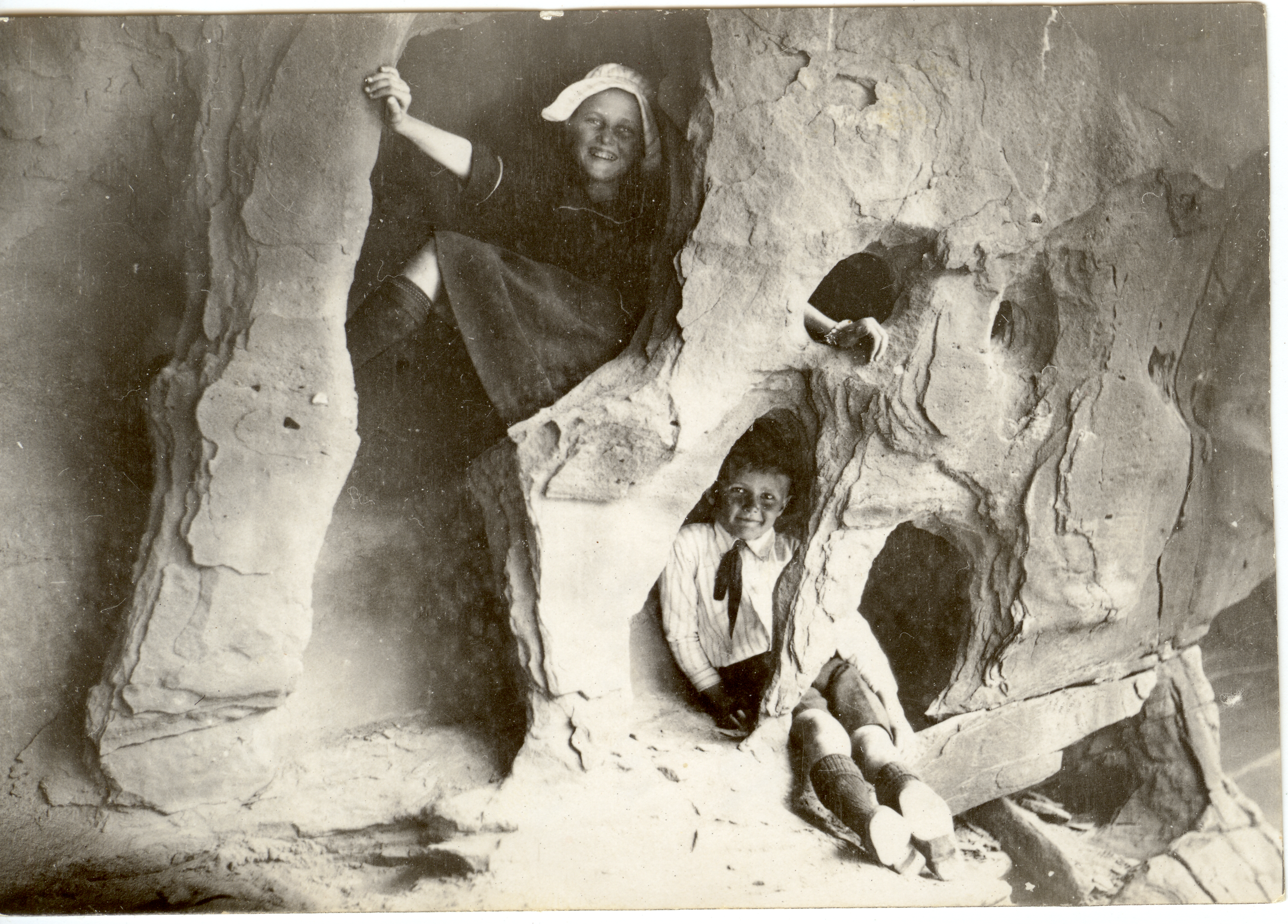
Kurt Johannsen as a child in the 1920s (right) with his sister Trudy Hayes

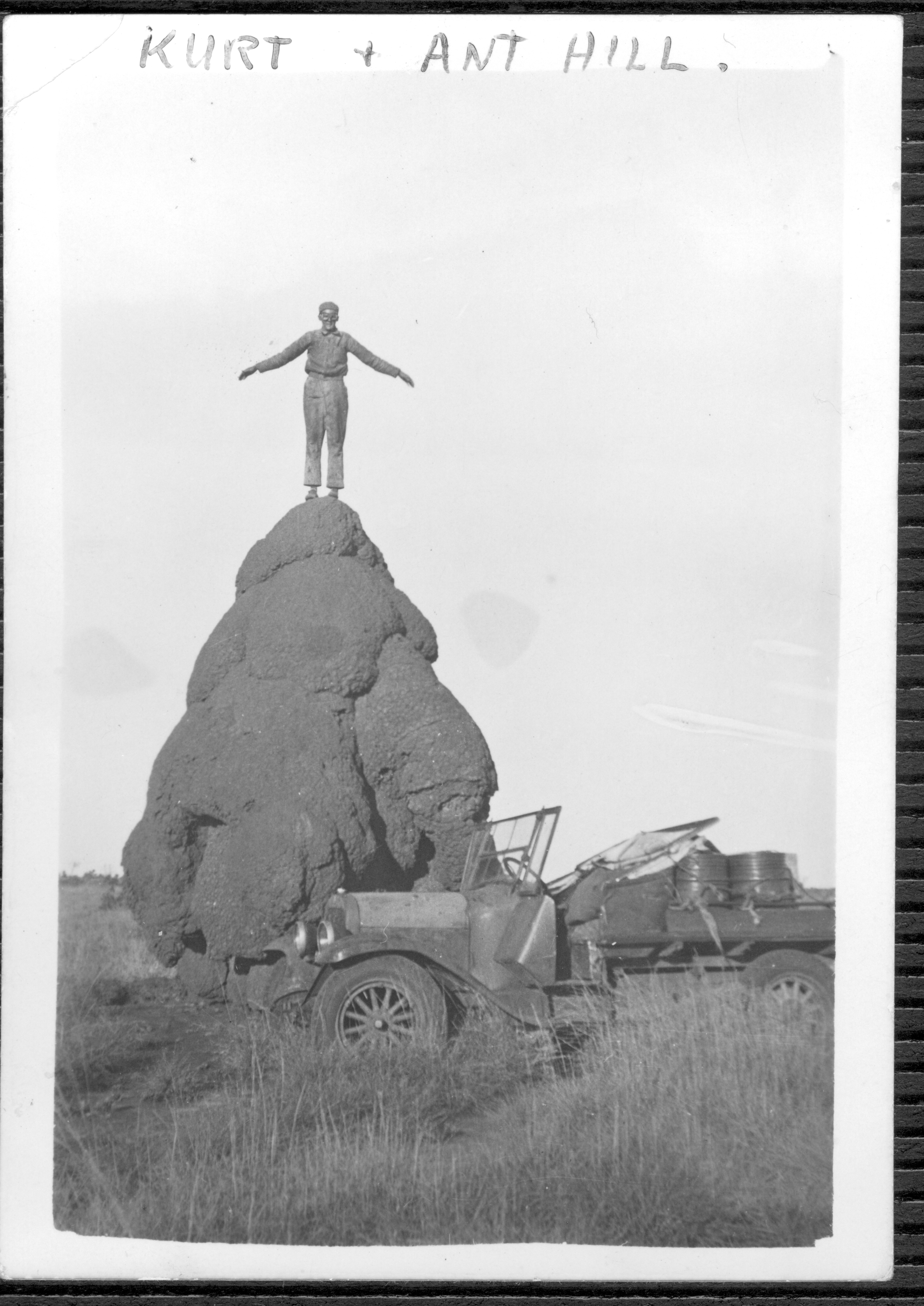
Kurt Johannsen posing on top of an anthill; date unknown

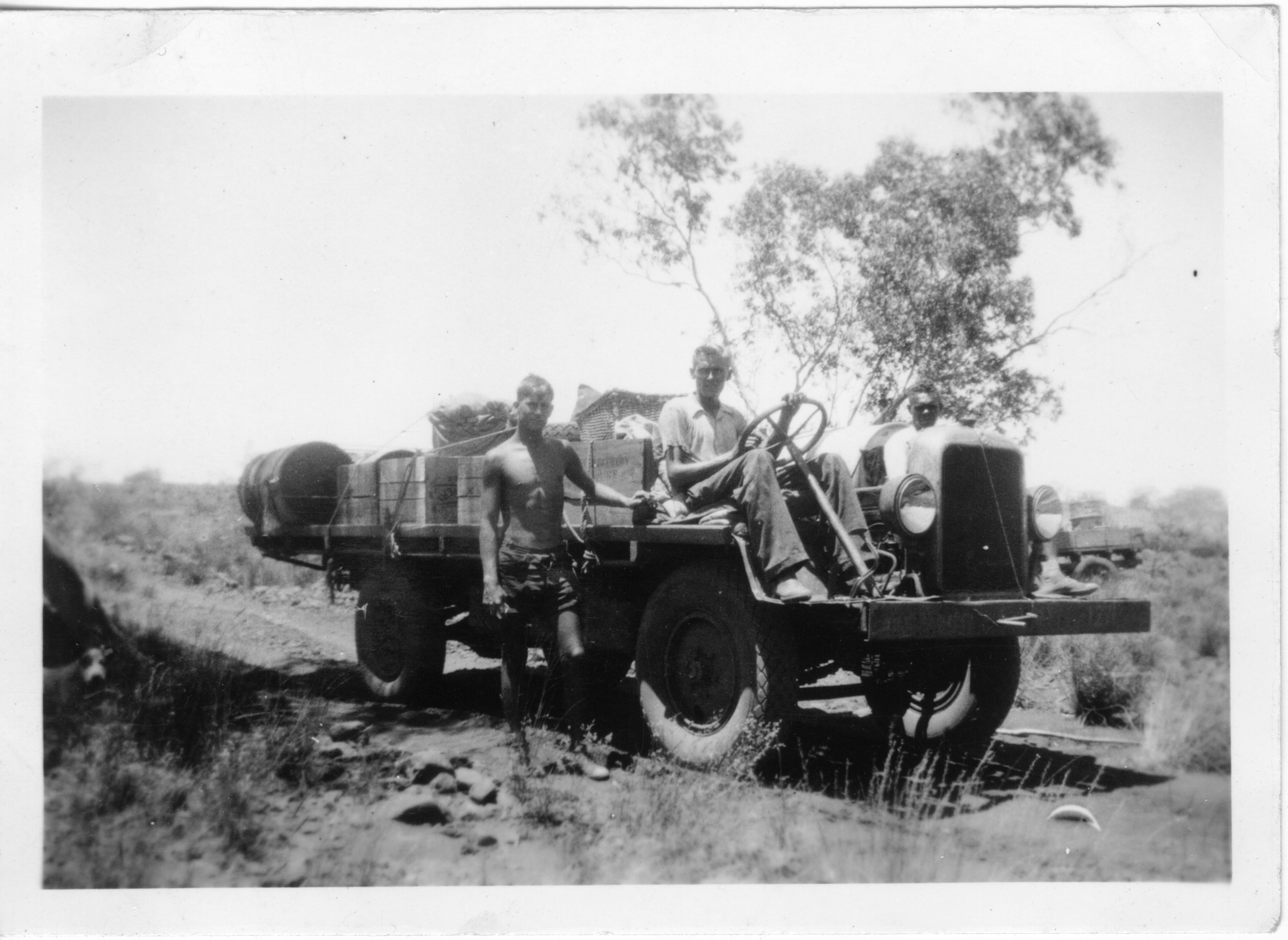
Kurt and his truck ‘The Bittser’ and Alec Conway, date unknown

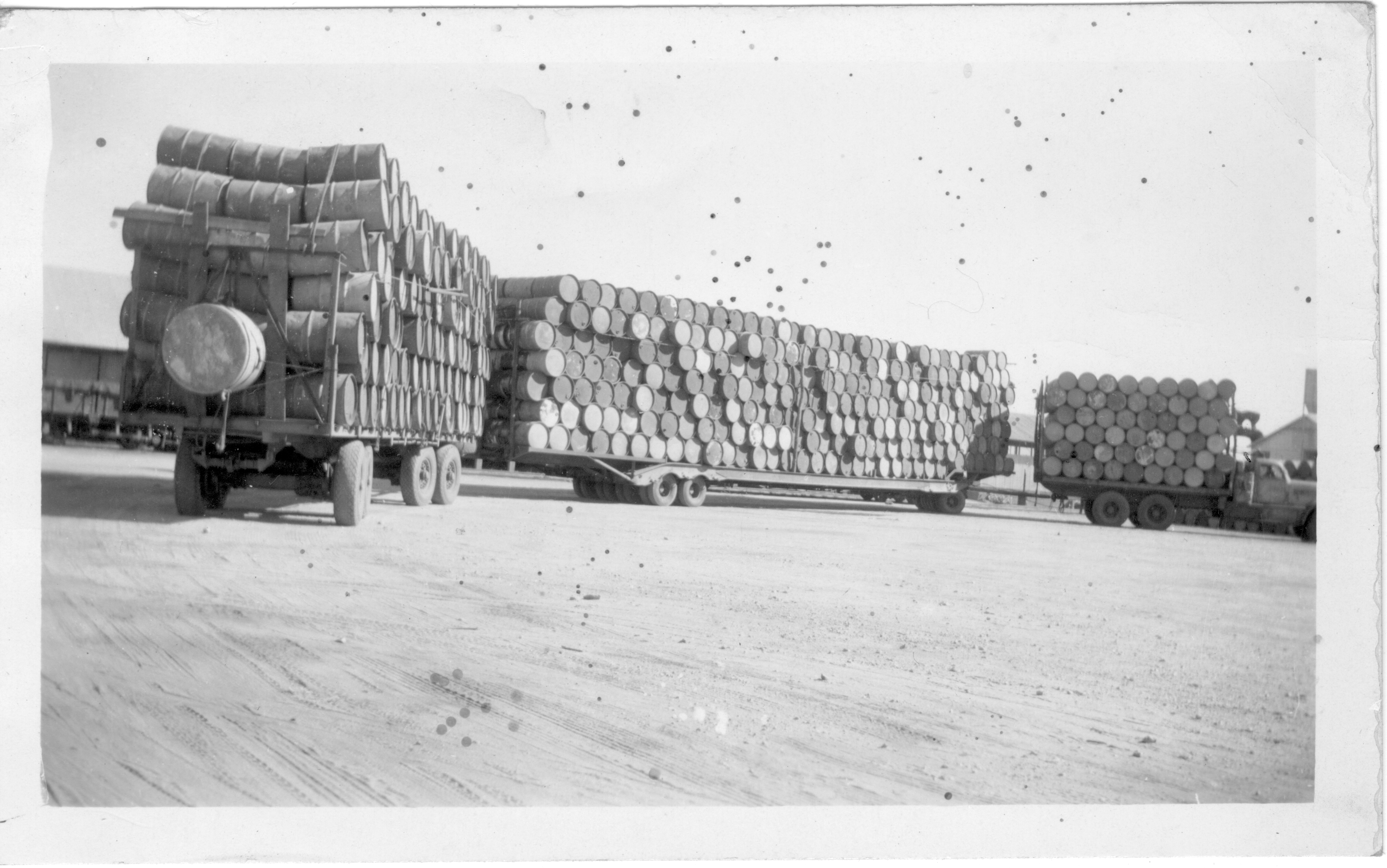
'The Bittser' carrying fuel drums, date unknown

Kurt Johanssen in front of Bertha, the first road train, 1948

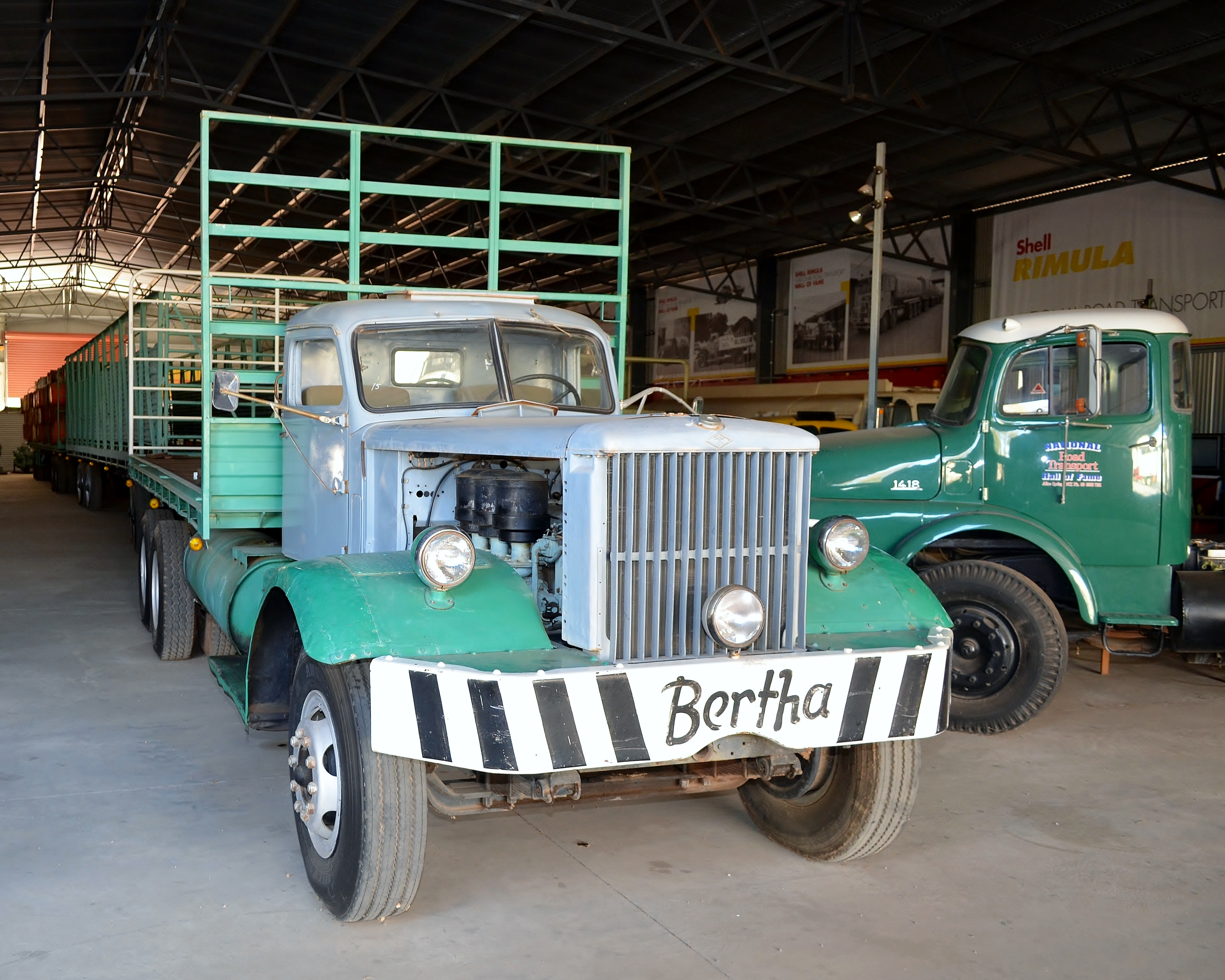
'Bertha' the first road train, invented by Kurt Johannsen on display at the National Road Transport Museum, Alice Springs in 2015
