= Hale River =

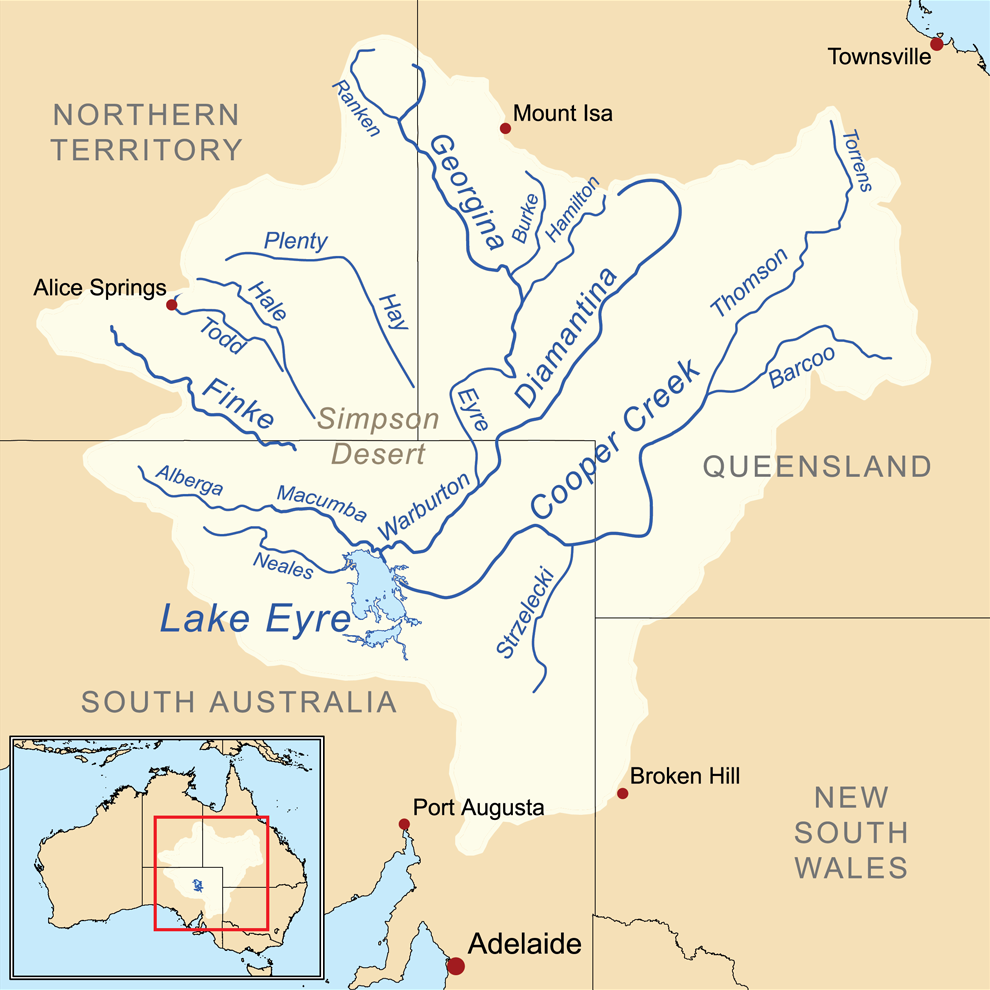

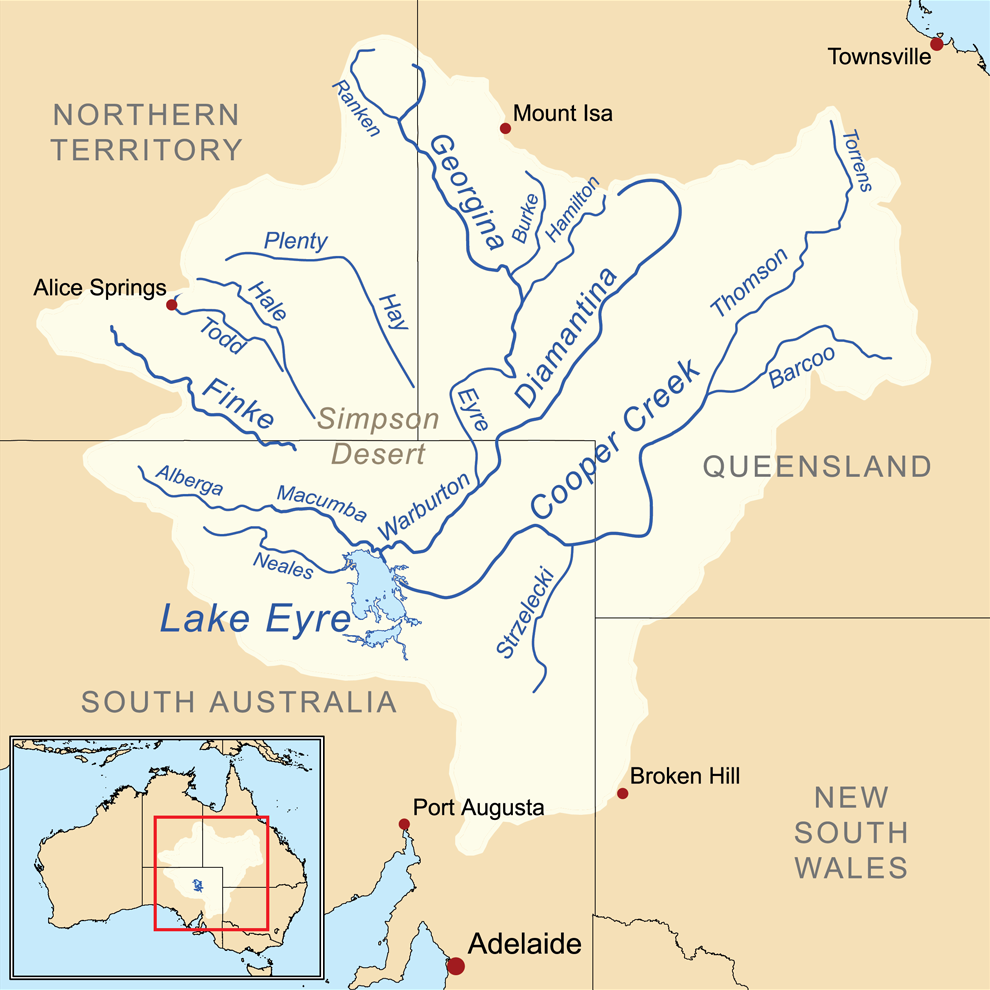
- Map of the Lake Eyre Basin showing Hale River

Location
- Country: Australia
- Territory: Northern Territory

Physical characteristics
- Source: Mount Laughlen
  - coordinates: 23°16′23″S 134°14′12″E
  - elevation: 748 m (2,454 ft)
- Mouth: Finke River
  - coordinates: 24°43′20″S 135°45′32″E
  - elevation: 189 m (620 ft)
- Length: 380 km (240 mi)

Basin features
- River system: Lake Eyre Basin

The Hale River is a river in the southeast of the Northern Territory of Australia. Most of the year, however, it has no water.

It is known as Lhere Altera or Arletherre to the eastern Arrernte people, who are the traditional owners of much of the country it flows through.

== Geography ==
=== River course ===
The river rises at The Garden on the north slopes of Mount Laughlen in the MacDonnell Ranges about 60 km (37 mi) northeast of Alice Springs and flows from there to the southeast and through the water gaps such as Heavitree Gap in the MacDonnell Ranges. Most of its water seeps away in the western part of the Simpson Desert. Only in very wet years does it continue its course south and flows south of the border to South Australia, in Witjira National Park, into the Finke River.

=== Tributaries ===
- Winnecke Depot Creek - 669 m
- Tug Creek - 583 m
- Florence Creek - 560 m
- Pig Hole Creek - 479 m
- Cleary Creek - 375 m
- Five Mile Creek - 364 m
- Pulya Pulya Creek - 308 m
- Todd River - 264 m

The Todd River mostly seeps away near the Hale River in the Simpson Desert. It only overflows into the Hale River in very wet years.

=== Lakes flowed through ===
The Hale River flows through a water hole that is usually filled with water even when the river itself is dry:

- Coulthards Gap Waterhole - 437 m

== See also ==
- List of rivers of Australia § Northern Territory
