= Hermannsburg Potters =

Aboriginal Australian art centre

The Hermannsburg Potters are a group of Aranda women who formed an arts centre in Hermannsburg, Northern Territory (Ntaria) who work with painted ceramics that draw on many influences, while strongly reflecting the distinctive visual Aboriginal culture of Central Australia. Judith Inkamala is the chair and senior member of Hermannsburg Potters Aboriginal Corporation.

== History and influences ==
Hermannsburg has a strong history with many artistic successes and it is one of the birthplaces of contemporary Aboriginal art.

One of the first western artists to visit the Hermannsburg Community was Violet Teauge, who came to raise money for the Kuprilya Springs Pipeline, and she was followed soon after by Rex Battarbee who encouraged and supported Albert Namatjira, in internationally successful artist from the community, who was the beginning of the watercolour art movement in Hermannsburg. Both the Hermannsburg Potters and the Iltja Ntjarra (Many Hands) Art Centre are influenced by this movement.

Pastor Albrecht, a Lutheran missionary, who worked at Hermannsburg from 1926 - 1952, actively encouraged the development of the arts industry as a means for the community to make money; especially in the 1930s when a number of tourists started visiting the community.

The Hermannsburg Potters, which is women's only, are a more recent artistic incarnation in the community and it was started when, in 1990, senior law man Nashasson Ungwanaka invited an accomplished ceramicist Naomi Sharp to come and teach. The first small exhibition was held in Alice Springs in August 1991.

== Technique ==
Aboriginal people are intrinsically linked to and inseparable from their land, and clay is an important part of this as it is a "part of the skin of the earth itself".

Using this, almost sacred, clay the Hermannsburg Potters were able to create a distinctive style using the traditional hand-coil technique, and the lids support distinctive colourful sculpted animal, birds, bush tucker and aspects of community life.

== Artists ==
Elaine Namatjira, granddaughter of Albert Namatjira, was one of the leading artists. Her work influenced her nephew, Vincent Namatjira.

As of April 2020, senior artists at Hermannsburg Potters include:

- Anita Ratara Mbitjana
- Dawn Wheeler Ngala
- Hayley Coulthard Pangangka
- Irene Entata Mbitjana
- Judith Inkamala Pungkarta
- Lindy Rontji Pangangka
- Rahel Ungwanaka Kngwarria
- Rone Rubuntja Panangka
- Sonia Davis
