= Friedrich Wilhelm Albrecht =

Lutheran missionary in Australia (1894–1984)

Friedrich Wilhelm Albrecht MBE
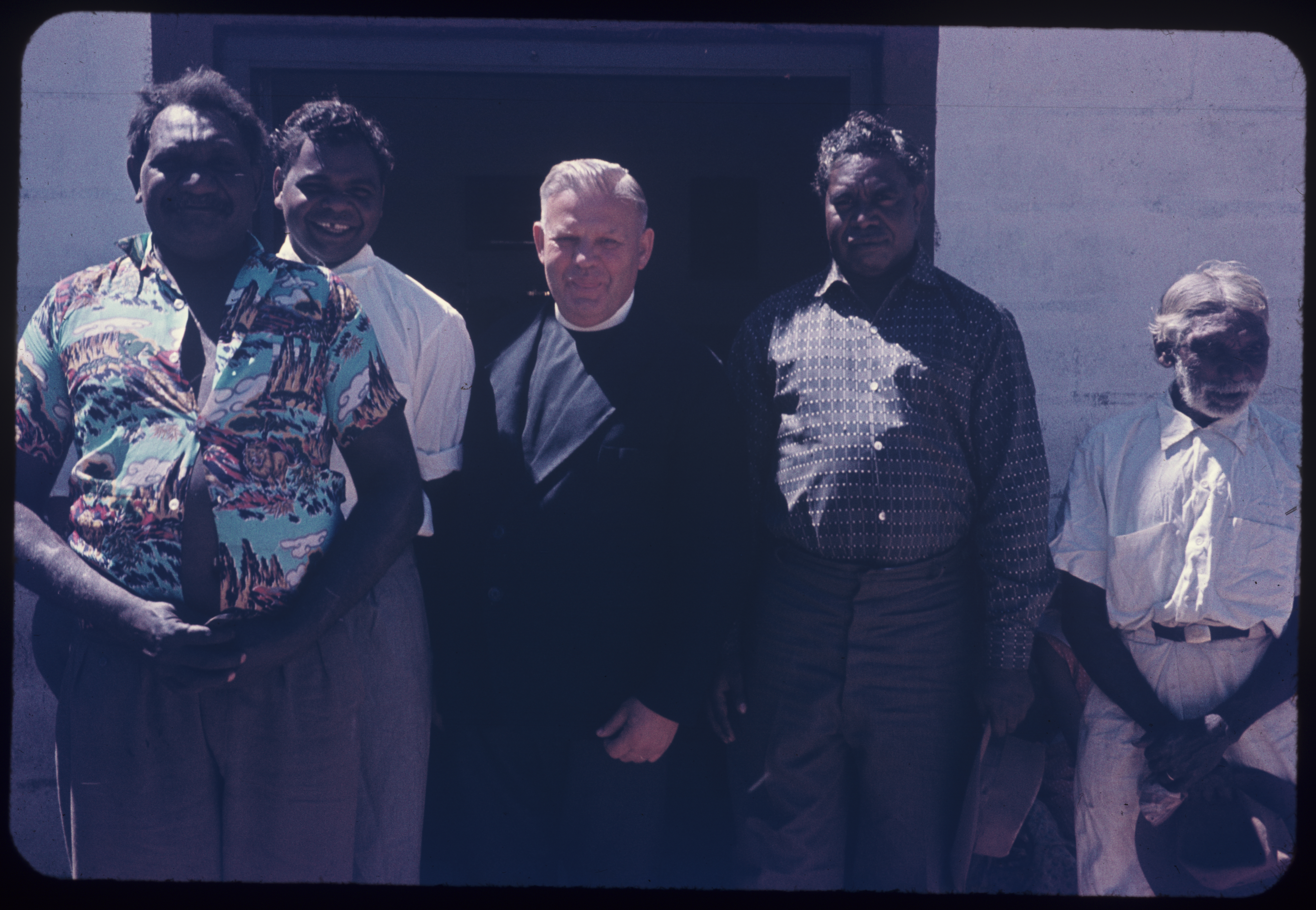
- Albrecht (centre) at a service at the Alice Springs Lutheran Church in 1957 or 1958
- Born: 15 October 1894; Pławanice, Poland
- Died: 16 March 1984 (aged 89); Fullarton, South Australia, Australia
- Burial place: Centennial Park Cemetery, Pasadena, South Australia
- Education: Hermannsburg Mission, Germany
- Occupation: Lutheran missionary
- Known for: missionary with Aborigines near Alice Springs, Australia
- Notable work: superintendent at Hermannsburg Mission
- Spouse: Minna Maria Margaretha Gevers (m. 1925; died 1983)
- Children: 3 sons, 2 daughters
- Parents: Ferdinand Albrecht (father); Helene Albrecht (mother)

Friedrich Wilhelm Albrecht MBE (15 October 1894 – 16 March 1984) was a Lutheran missionary and pastor who was the superintendent at Hermannsburg Mission in Central Australia from 1926 to 1952 where he made a significant contribution.

== Early life ==
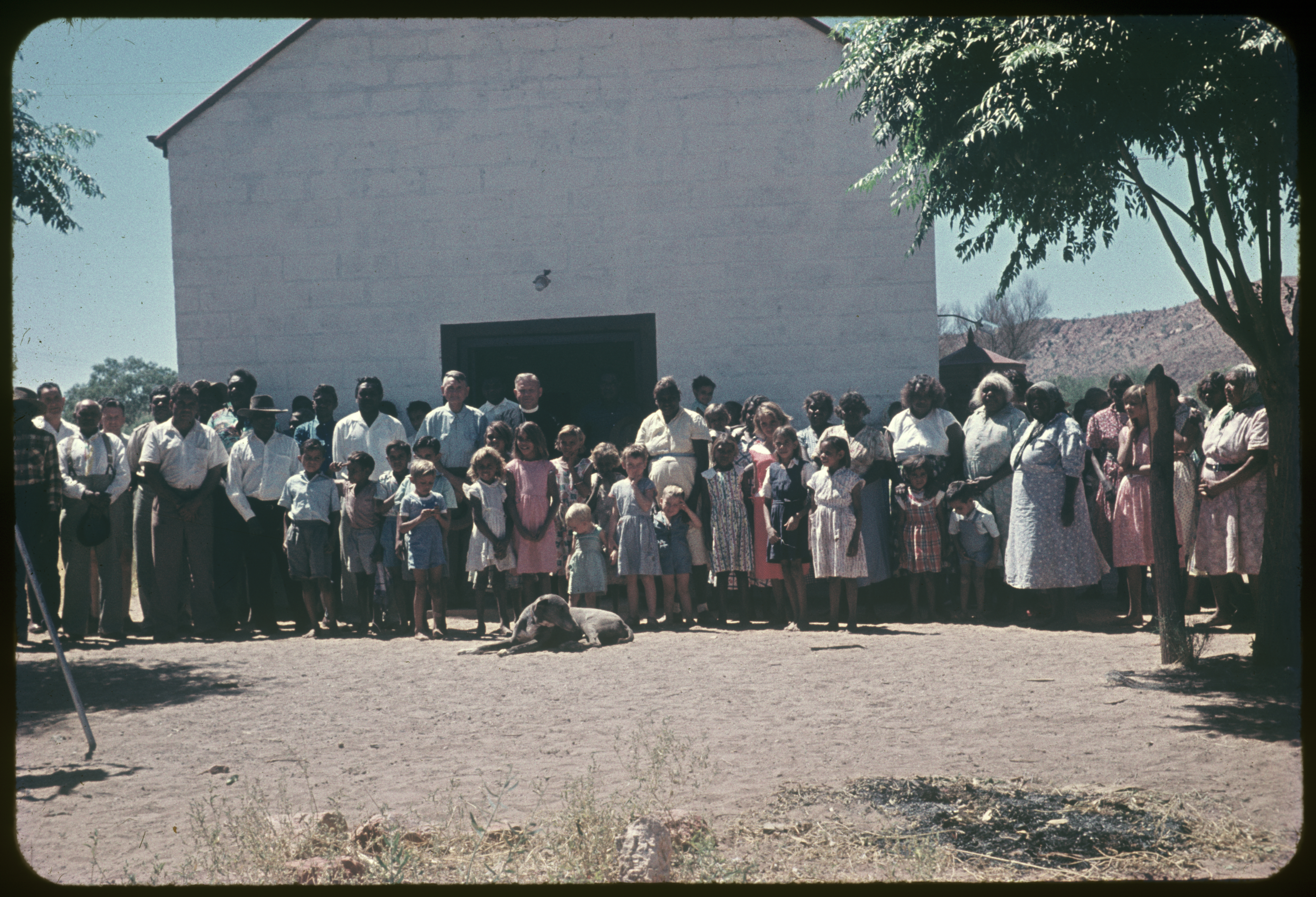
FW Albrecht at a service at the Alice Springs Lutheran Church in 1957 or 1958; congregation shown

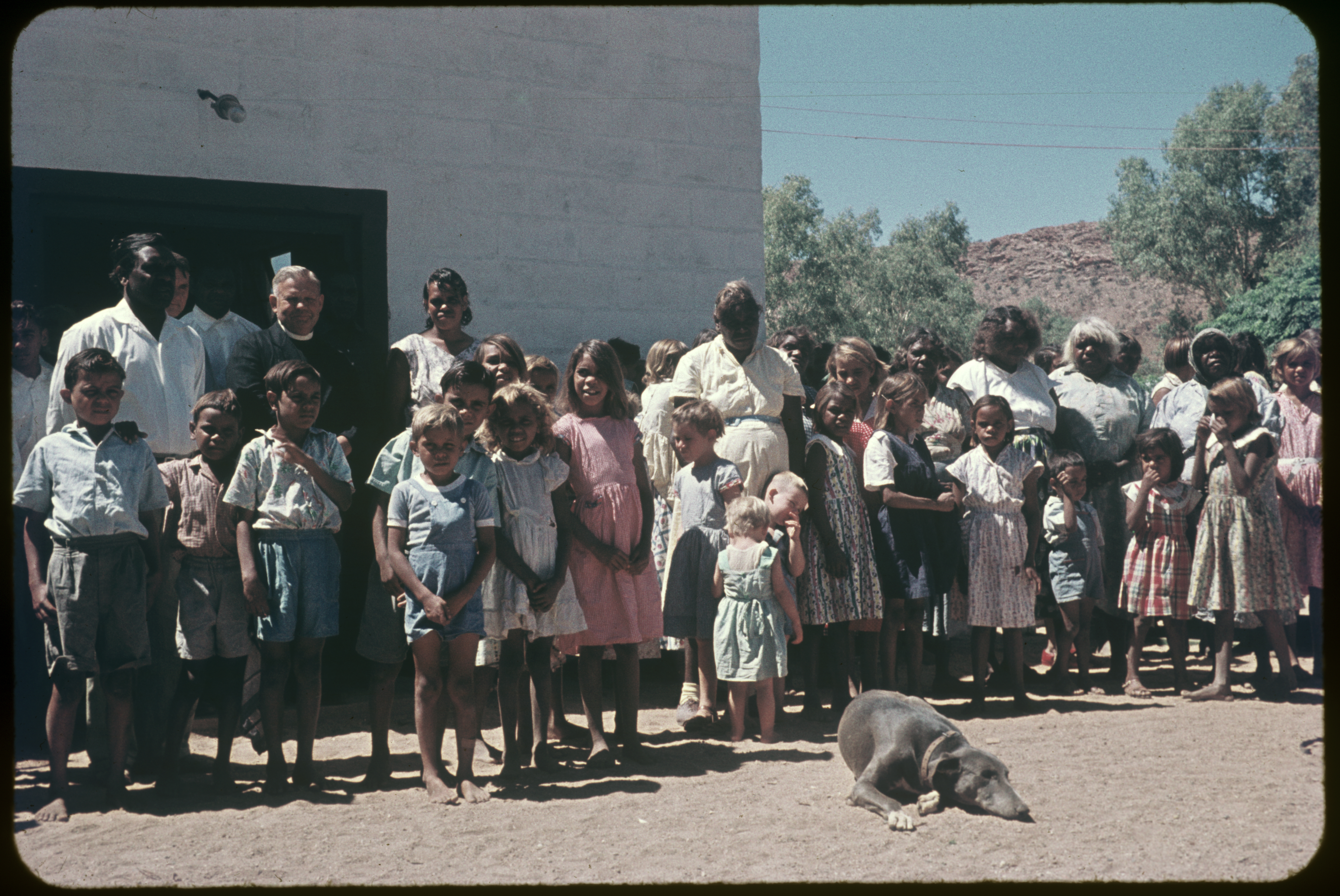
FW Albrecht at a service at the Alice Springs Lutheran Church in 1957 or 1958; congregation shown

Albrecht was born on 15 October 1894 at Pławanice in Poland to Ferdinand and Helene Albrecht and is the eldest of their 10 children. Albrecht initially attended the local village school before he moved to study and live at the Hermannsburg Mission in Germany in 1913 and he graduated in 1924.

World War I did interrupt his studies and, due to a childhood injury making him lame in one leg, Albrecht served in the German medical corps on the Russian front. He was awarded an Iron Cross for tending wounded soldiers when under fire.

After completing his studies he received a call to work at Hermannsburg Mission, 125 km (78 mi) from Alice Springs, but before he could begin he received English tuition in the United States. Minna Maria Margaretha Gevers, who Albrecht met in Germany, followed him there and they married in Winnipeg, Canada on 14 September 1925. Following their marriage they sailed to Sydney where they arrived on 18 October 1925 before immediately travelling to South Australia.

In South Australia, at Nuriootpa, Albrecht was ordained as a pastor in the United Evangelical Lutheran Church of Australia on 14 February 1926.

== Life in the Northern Territory ==
Albrecht reached Hermannsburg on 16 April 1926 where he was the replacement for Carl Strehlow who died unexpectedly in October 1922. Gerhardt Johannsen delivered the couple to the mission, driving them from Oodnadatta, via Alice Springs.

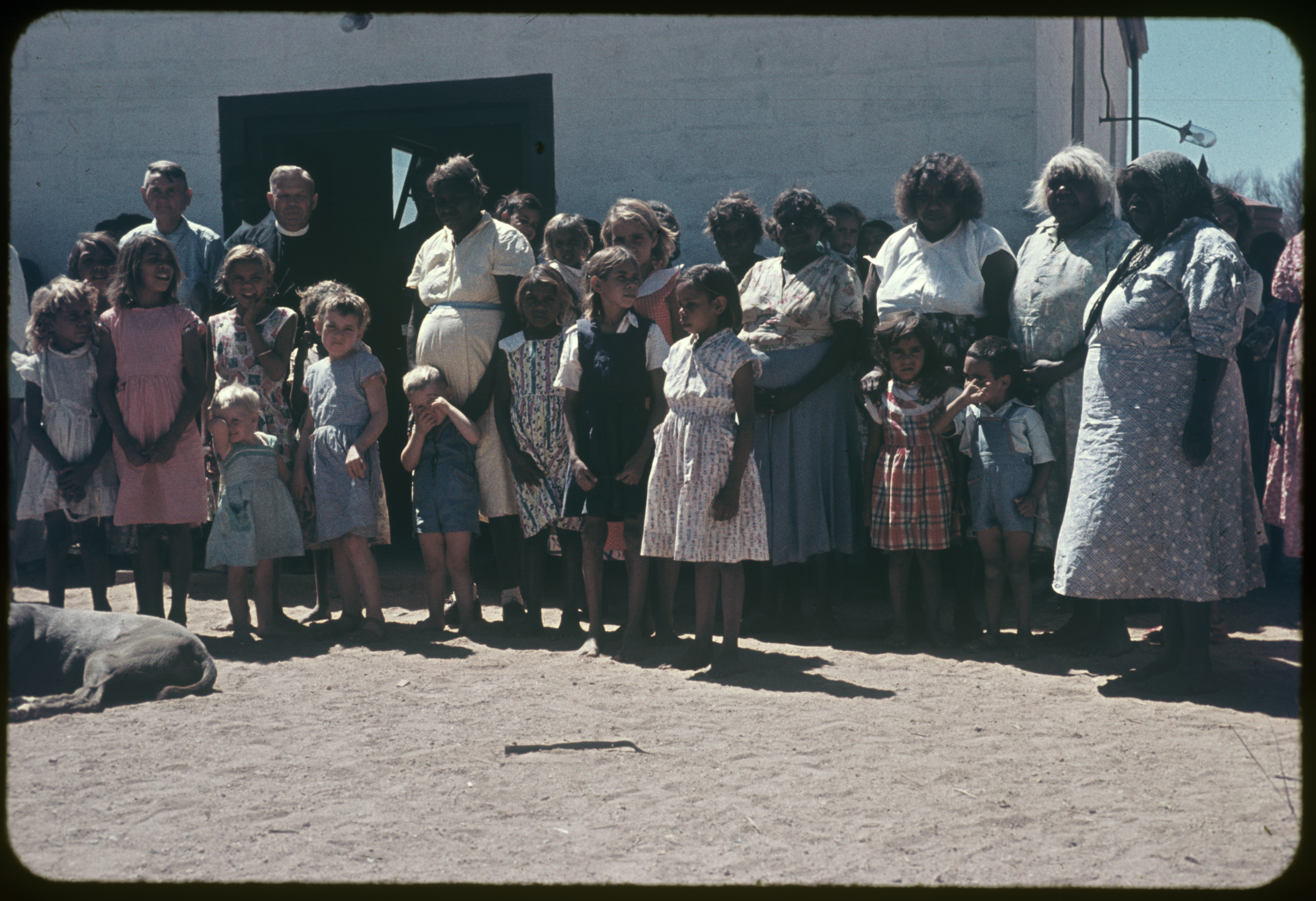
FW Albrecht at a service at the Alice Springs Lutheran Church in 1957 or 1958; congregation shown

Albrecht's first priority after arriving at the mission was to learn Arrernte and he was assisted in this by Moses Tjalkabota Uraikuria, an Arrernte man of high degree and Christian evangelist, who served as a teacher and guide to the missionaries at Hermannsburg (and T. G. H. Strehlow). After achieving language sufficiency Albrecht continued work on translating the Bible, delivering sermons and training Aboriginal evangelists.

Albrecht arrived in Hermannsburg during a period of extreme drought and there had already been thoughts of closure; between 1926 and 1929 it is recorded that 41 of the 51 children born at the mission died and this ill health also affected Albrecht's family with his infant daughter Helene weighing less at four then she had at two. Adults were also affected with some deaths from scurvy and general ill health, primarily from eczema, kidney disease and tuberculosis. Spurned on by this tragedy Albrecht advocated for the construction of the Kuprilya Springs Pipeline, which the Lutheran Mission Board refused to support, and he ultimately received the funds required from artists Jessie Traill and Una and Violet Teague. The completion of this pipeline, and the associated fresh fruit and vegetables they were able to grow, infant mortality decreased significantly. Albrecht later lamented:

How many graves could have been left undug if we had had the water during those long years of drought

— Friedrich Wilhelm Albrecht, Australian Dictionary of Biography

Albrecht had a deep respect for Aboriginal spirituality but he saw no way to reconcile it with Christian faith. Because of these views Albrecht removed and disposed of the Tjurunga in the sacred Manangananga Cave; unlike Albrecht, Carl Strehlow had always acknowledged the importance of this site and the sacred objects, and had left it untouched.

Despite this Albrecht is remembered as an advocate for Aboriginal people, who was concerned for their material and social welfare. A part of this in action was his work with Charles Duguid and T.G.H Strehlow to establish Aboriginal settlements like Areyonga and Yuendumu. He was also instrumental in establishing the arts and crafts industry in Hermannsburg as a way for the community to make money, especially when tourists began arriving in the 1930s. He also encouraged Albert Namatjira who he helped sell his paintings. Additionally Albrecht operated the mission as a working cattle station and established a tannery; the hides of which were used for leather-work products.

In 1952 Albrecht and his family (3 sons and 2 daughters) moved to Alice Springs following his wife, Minna, experiencing regular ill health. Albrecht continued his work as a pastor in Alice Springs until his retirement in 1962.

In 1958 he was appointed MBE.

== Later life ==
In 1962 the Albrecht's retired to Linden Park, South Australia; although he continued to carry out pastoral duties.

Albrecht died in Fullarton, South Australia on 16 March 1984, four months after his wife's death, and was buried in Centennial Park Cemetery, Pasadena, South Australia.

== Publications ==
A full list of publications are available on Trove.

== Legacy ==
Albrecht Drive and Oval in Alice Springs are named for him as well as Albrecht Road in Kintore.
