= Glen Helen =

Glen Helen may refer to:

- Glen Helen, Isle of Man
- Glen Helen Gorge, MacDonnell Ranges, Australia
- Glen Helen Nature Preserve, owned by Glen Helen Association (earlier Antioch College) in Yellow Springs, Ohio, United States
- Glen Helen Regional Park in San Bernardino, California, United States
  - Glen Helen Pavilion, former name of the San Manuel Amphitheater
  - Glen Helen Raceway
