= Massacre of Running Waters =

Massacre in Northern Territory, Australia

- Location: 24.2945°S 132.9011°E; Irbmangkara, Finke River, Northern Territory
- Date: c. 1875
- Attack type: Ambush, massacre, raid
- Weapons: Boomerangs, spears
- Deaths: 80–100 (Strehlow's estimate)
- Injuries: Unknown
- Perpetrators: 50 to 60 Matuntara warriors
- Motive: Retribution for alleged sacrilege by Southern Arrernte elders (according to Strehlow)

The massacre of Running Waters was a reported attack at Irbmangkara, a permanent waterhole on the Finke River about 200 kilometres (120 mi) south-west of Alice Springs in the Northern Territory, in which a raiding party of 50 to 60 Matuntara warriors is said to have killed a large number of Southern Arrernte (Aranda) men, women and children in about 1875.

The principal account was written by Ted Strehlow in Journey to Horseshoe Bend (1969), drawing on the recollections of Moses Tjalkabota, who was a child at the time. Strehlow attributed the attack to retribution for an alleged act of sacrilege by Irbmangkara elders, and estimated that the dead "could well have" numbered 80 to 100.

Religious studies scholar Sam Gill concluded that an event of significance to the peoples of the region probably occurred at Irbmangkara, and that people at Hermannsburg (Ntaria) regard it as a continuing factor in local politics. He cautioned, however, that Strehlow's account is literary in character and must be read critically in light of Strehlow's background and purposes.

== Events ==
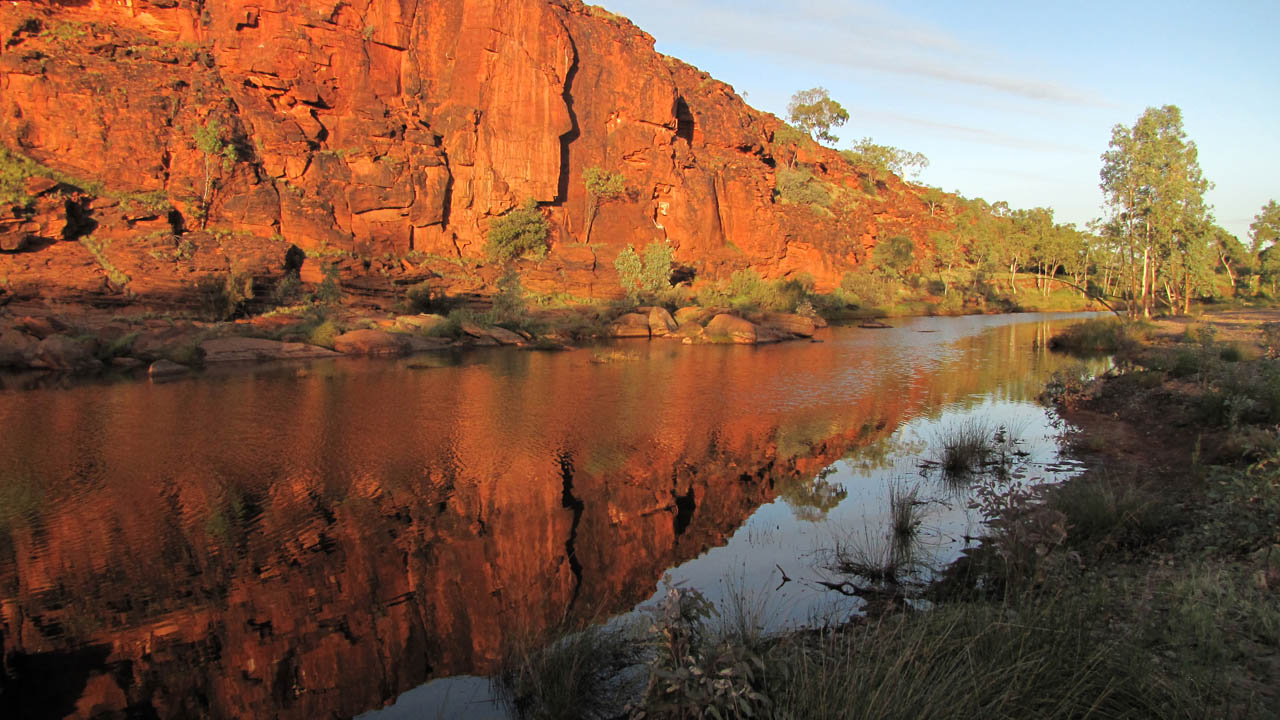
Irbangkara (Running Waters) in 2017

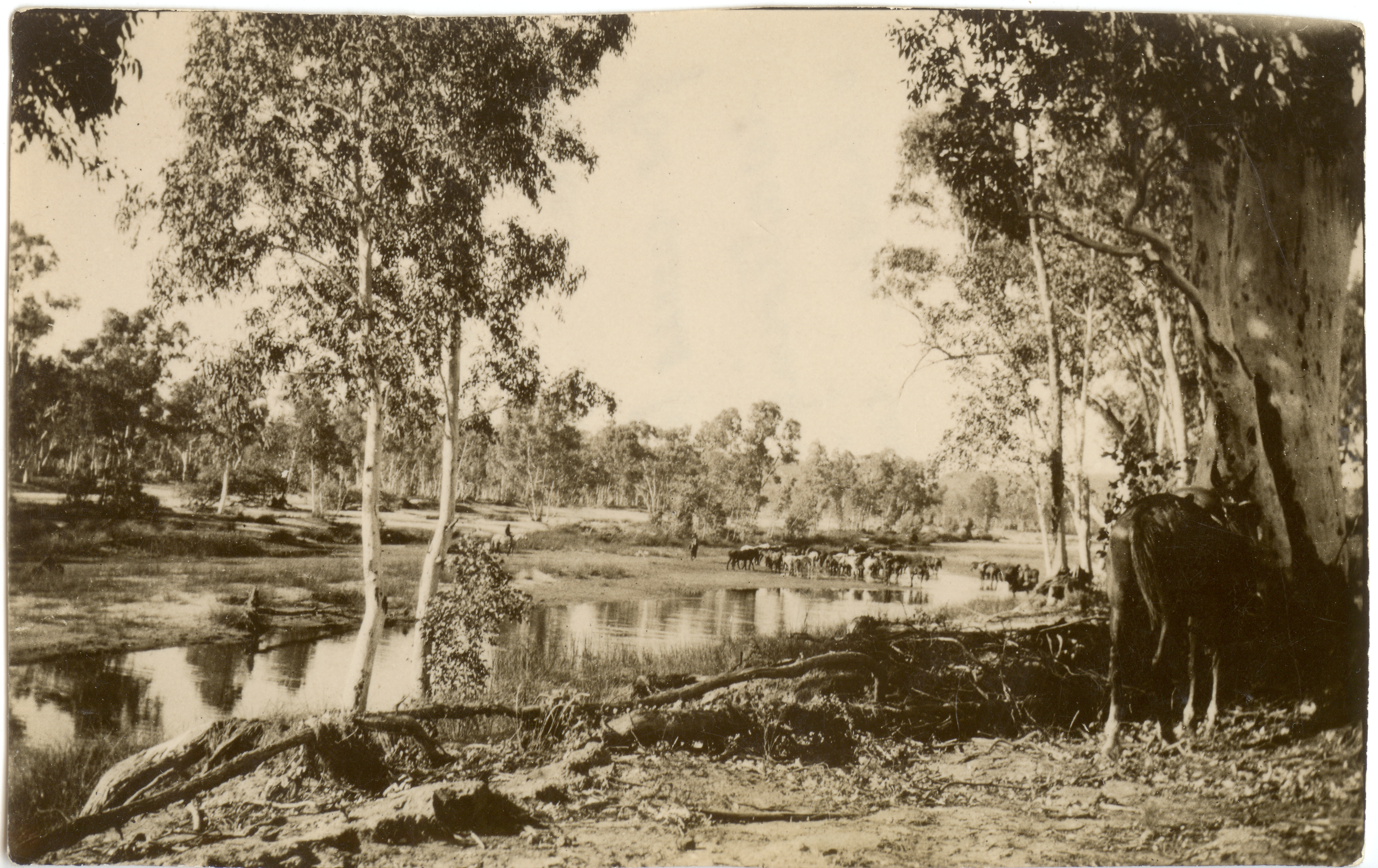
Irbangkara (Running Waters) as pictured in the 1920s

According to Strehlow, the massacre was triggered by a middle-aged man called Kalejika, who belonged to a Central Aranda local group. Kalejika paid a visit to Irbmangkara, and then told some Upper Southern Aranda men that Ltjabakuka, the aged and highly respected ceremonial chief of Irbmangkara, together with some of his assistant elders, had committed sacrilege by giving uninitiated boys men's blood to drink from a shield into which it had been poured for ritual purposes. Sacrilege was an offence always punished by death.

According to historian Geoffrey Blainey, the party of Aboriginal warriors was sent to avenge the sacrilege and selected Running Waters as the place where the Southern Arrernte could be readily be surprised, "and timed their secret raid for... when their enemies were cooking their meals before making their beds on the ground".

Three parties of warriors, hidden among the bushes of the nearby mountain slopes and in the undergrowth in the river bed at their foot, were watching the men and women of Irbmangkara returning to their camp; the armed men [then]... rushed in, like swift dingoes upon flock of unsuspecting emus. Spears and boomerangs flew with deadly aim. Within a matter of minutes Ltjabakuka and his men were lying lifeless in their blood at their brush shelters.

Strehlow writes that the warriors then turned their murderous attention to the women and older children, and either speared or clubbed them to death. Finally, according to the grim custom of warriors and avengers, they broke the limbs of the infants, leaving them to die "natural deaths". The final number of the dead could well have reached the high figure of from 80 to 100 men, women, and children. One of the Aranda women had merely pretended to be dead and escaped northward to raise the alarm.

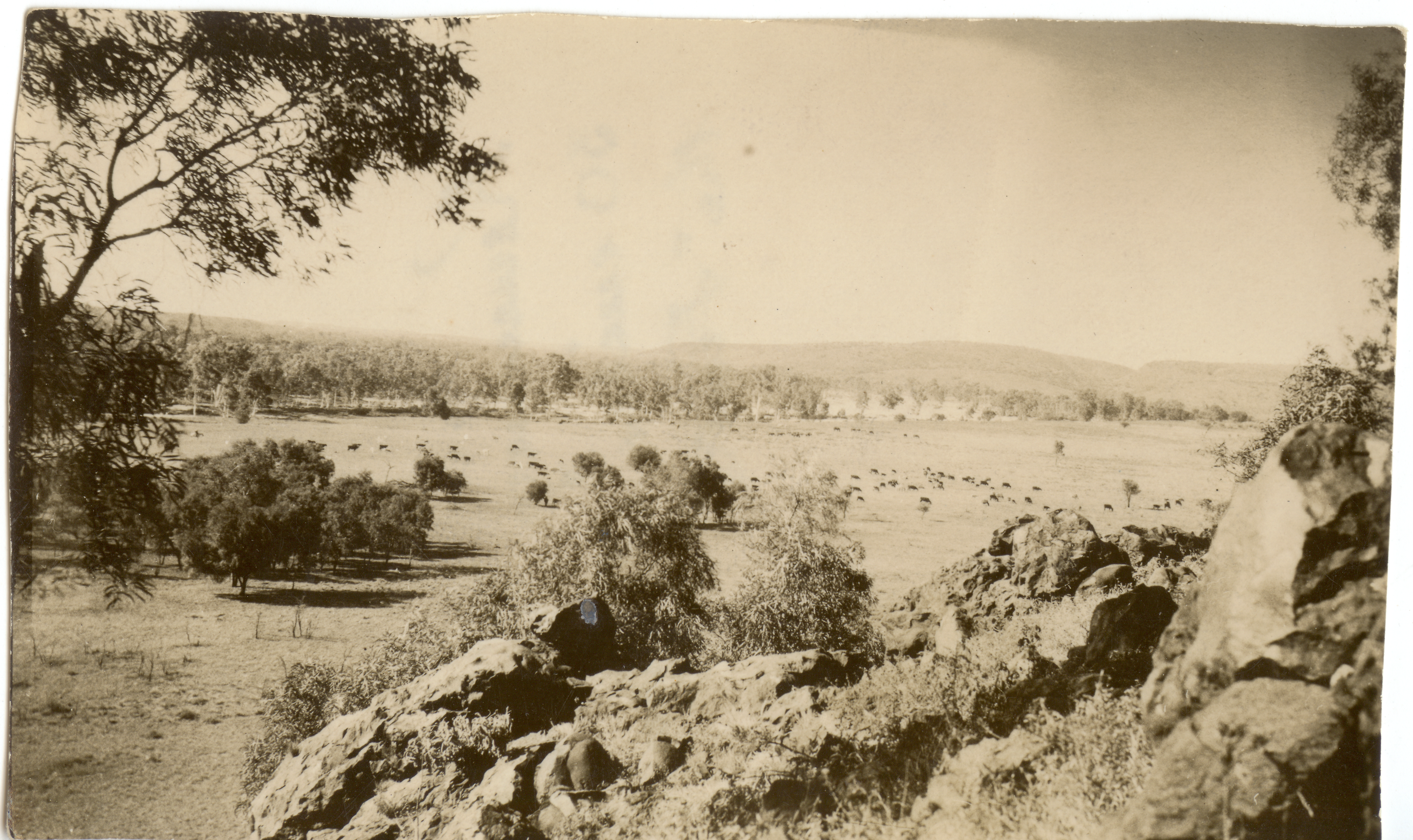
Irbangkara (Running Waters) as pictured in the 1920s

As a small boy, Moses Tjalkabota was greatly affected by the massacre, given that two of his friends and their mother were killed in the raid, and he had himself witnessed the great clouds of smoke arising from the funeral pyres when the bodies were burnt the next day. Much later, his reminiscences of the killings were recorded and translated into English, and in some details, they are the same when describing the ruthlessness of the raid.

== Origin of the account ==
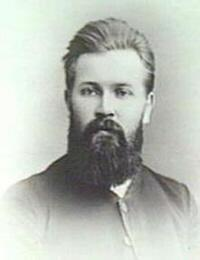
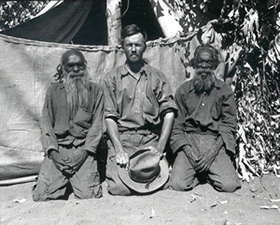
Missionary Carl Strehlow (top); and his son, Ted Strehlow with two Aranda elders (below)

The massacre occurred in 1875, two years before the Germans set up their Lutheran mission at Hermannsburg in 1877. Tjalkabota, who was an Aboriginal translator for both Carl Strehlow (who led the mission from 1894 to 1922) and his son Ted Strehlow, was a young boy (6 to 9 years of age) at the time of the massacre and, according to researcher Peter Latz, "he recalls it [the massacre] in some detail".

Carl Strehlow's recordings of the massacre appear in his grandson John Strehlow's historical biography of this grandparents.

Ted Strehlow wrote a detailed account of the massacre in his 1969 book, Journey to Horseshoe Bend.

== Aftermath and analysis ==
Strehlow wrote of the massacre as an example of an incompatibility in integrating Indigenous Australian customary law with the modern Australian legal system. He describes the capital punishment enacted against the Arrernte people who were unwitting in the crime as an unacceptably harsh punishment in the Australian legal mind and contrary to mens rea.

Professor Sam Gill of the University of Colorado Boulder has analysed Strehlow's account in his book Storytracking, published in 1998. He concluded that it was likely that something occurred at Irbangkara on a scale that was considered important by the peoples of the region. However, Gill noted that Strehlow's accounts are embellished with a literary trope and go beyond reporting the events, and that the account must be read in light of Strehlow's role as a missionary, academic and literary figure in order for the account to be critically appreciated and responsibly used.

Gill was assured by the local people at Hermannsburg/Ntaria that the events at Irbangkara remained a shaping factor in the local politics of the area, and believed that a possible source of the evidence of manoeuvres and stealth of the Mantuntara attackers could have been an existing story tradition told by the Arrernte that was built on circumstantial evidence. He also stated that there was independent evidence of subsequent attacks, one of a hunter survivor of the 1875 incident, Nameia, in 1890; and where local constable William Willshire had been involved in the deaths of Aboriginal people at nearby Tempe Downs Station in 1891.

== See also ==
- List of massacres of Indigenous Australians
