= Carl Strehlow =

German missionary (1871–1922)

Carl Friedrich Theodor Strehlow (German: [kaʁl ˈfʁiːdʁɪç ˈteːodoːɐ̯ ˈʃtʁeːloː]; 23 December 1871 – 20 October 1922) was an anthropologist, linguist and genealogist who served on two Lutheran missions in remote parts of Australia from May 1892 to October 1922. He was at Killalpaninna Mission (also known as Bethesda) in northern South Australia, from 1892 to 1894, and then Hermannsburg, 80 miles (130 km) west of Alice Springs, from 1894 to 1922. Strehlow was assisted by his wife Friederike, who played a central role in reducing the high infant mortality which threatened Aboriginal communities all over Australia after the onset of white settlement.

As a polymath with an interest in natural history, and informed by the local Aranda people, Strehlow provided plant and animal specimens to museums in Germany and Australia. Strehlow also collaborated on the first complete translation of the New Testament into an Aboriginal language (Dieri), published by the British and Foreign Bible Society in 1897. He later translated the New Testament into the Western Aranda language and also produced a reader and service book in this language. His son Theodor (Ted) Strehlow, who was 14 at the time of his father's death, built his career in part on the researches carried out by his father.

== Early life and education ==
Strehlow was born on 23 December 1871 at Fredersdorf, near Angermünde, in the Uckermark, Brandenburg, Germany, to the Free Lutheran village school teacher, Carl Ludwig Strehlow (10 March 1831 – 6 November 1896) and his wife Friederike Wilhelmine Augustine Schneider (3 August 1831 – 3 September 1916). The seventh child of this marriage, Strehlow grew up as the oldest son, two earlier sons having died young of diphtheria. Strehlow's oldest sister, Magdalena, born in 1857, was fourteen years older than him.

Little is known about his education other than that until 1886 when he was 14, he was given a sound, basic education by his father at the local Free Lutheran school, set up by the Old Lutherans in opposition to the state school, integrated into the Union of the Calvinist and Lutheran Churches, which had been instigated by the Prussian King Friedrich Wilhelm III in 1817 after the Napoleonic Wars. Sometime before 1886, Strehlow's local Old Lutheran clergyman, Rev. Carl Seidel, had begun to educate him in the subjects required for matriculation (Latin, Greek, history, English, mathematics, religion and German) during the four-year preparation for confirmation, which was then obligatory. Lessons took place in the manse at the main town of the district, Angermünde, where Seidel was based. A keen linguist influenced by the ideas of Jacob Grimm, Seidel laid the foundations for Strehlow's later interest in linguistics, which is the key to understanding his views on the antiquity of Aboriginal society and culture, and especially its decay from a previous higher level, something Strehlow thought was evident in their languages, of which he mastered three: Dieri, Aranda and Loritja.

Though a brilliant student, among the anomalies of Strehlow's education, was his father's opposition to him having a university education on the grounds that the family was too poor. This opposition may have arisen from bitterness – in 1856 his father was jailed for two weeks for teaching religious instruction while working in the state system in Seefeld in Farther Pomerania, something forbidden him because he was a member of the Old Lutheran Church.

Strehlow senior's older brother and sister emigrated to the United States of America, possibly for religious reasons, though this is not certain. Assisted by Seidel, Strehlow won his father's permission to study for the ministry in any of the mission schools in Germany by November 1887 when he was not quite 16. Since a university degree was mandatory in Germany for the clergy, this meant he could only become a clergyman abroad, which in practice meant working among German immigrants in America. After being rejected by the Leipzig Mission because he was too young, with financial assistance from the Society for Home and Foreign Mission (Gesellschaft für Innere und Äussere Mission) set up so poorer students could study, Strehlow entered the seminary founded by Wilhelm Löhe in Neuendettelsau, Middle Franconia, Bavaria at Easter 1888. Here, the three-year curriculum was stamped by the ideas of Rev. Friedrich Bauer, whose German Grammar ran to 37 editions by 1913, and later became the Duden. After Bauer's death in 1873, the school was run by Rev. Johannes Deinzer, who was heavily influenced by his teachers at Erlangen, including Nägelsbach, von Hofmann, Thomasius, von Raumer and others. The heavy emphasis on classical languages at the seminary resulted in the more academically inclined students reading works by Homer, Virgil, Sophocles, and others. Strehlow was awarded a "brilliant first" prior to his graduation at Easter 1892, with his final exams delayed possibly because he was thought too young to hold the position of pastor in an American congregation. By then, most of his class had left for their posts abroad, a number of them to South Australia, but most to America.

== Career ==
=== Missionary calling ===
Among the personalities who resisted the fusion of the Lutheran and Calvinist Churches was Rev. Friedrich Meischel, who arrived in South Australia in 1860. He had earlier been in contact with Neuendettelsau's founder, Wilhelm Löhe, and is thought by some to have been inspired by him. After Stuart's epic overland crossing from Adelaide to what later became Darwin and back again in 1862, Meischel promoted the idea of missionary work among the inland tribes, in particular the Dieri, who had helped Burke and Wills after their ill-fated attempted crossing of the continent. Meischel's dealings were largely with Revs. Christian Auricht and G.J. Rechner of the Immanuel Synod, formed after a split between the first Lutheran clergy to come to Australia, Kavel and Fritsche. A mission supported by both the Immanuel and Australian Synods was duly set up at Killalpaninna on the Cooper's Creek north-east of Marree, staffed by personnel from Harms' mission school at Hermannsburg Mission in Germany. By the time of Strehlow's graduation, missionaries were recruited from Neuendettelsau after the Immanuel and Australian Synods decided they could no longer work together, and neither could work with Hermannsburg in Germany, which had aligned itself with the state church and become "unionist". A staffing crisis in 1891, in part due to disagreements between the missionaries themselves, but also conflict with the state governments where Lutheran missions were operating, resulted in Deinzer being asked for a further missionary. Strehlow was as yet unplaced with an American congregation, so was approached to fill the position of teacher at Killalpaninna, which he duly accepted, arriving in South Australia on 30 May 1892 where he was ordained at Light Pass, South Australia., reaching the outstation Etadunna on 11 July 1892, and Killalpaninna itself a day or so after. Being split between several sites, the mission settlements here were known collectively as Bethesda Mission and within six months of arrival at the mission Strehlow learnt Dieri.

=== The Dieri New Testament ===
The impetus for the New Testament in the Dieri language is said to have come not from Reuther but from Strehlow who, as the teacher in the mission school, needed printed material in Dieri for his students, a number of whom were older people receiving religious instruction. He had also just received a rebuff in his attempt to marry Frieda Keysser. Given a thorough linguistic training from his local clergyman Seidel before going to Neuendettelsau, Strehlow had the advantage in translation over Reuther, who only spent two years training at Neuendettelsau and had no prior knowledge of Greek, the language of the Koinos New Testament. He also knew no Latin. The resulting translation was a collaboration between the two missionaries and was published by the British and Foreign Bible Society in 1897. (Note: For greater detail see The Tale of Fried Keysser, pp. 325–34.) It was the first ever translation of the entire New Testament into an Aboriginal language.

=== Hermannsburg Mission ===
In October 1894, Strehlow was appointed jointly with his friend and former fellow student Rev. John Bogner to take over the abandoned Mission Station of Hermannsburg in Central Australia, then largely financed by sales of sheep, wool, horses and cattle. It had been newly purchased by the Immanuel Synod. Strehlow arrived on Friday 12 October 1894, still only 22, and with only three breaks for holidays, stayed there until 1922. He was on his own until Bogner arrived with his wife and child on 25 May 1895. Bogner was the manager, in charge of stock and the rebuilding of the structures which were falling into ruin, while Strehlow was the teacher in charge of education, religious instruction and translation. He used his knowledge of homeopathy to fight diseases, and had sufficient medical knowledge to set broken limbs. The population were mainly Aranda, with some Loritja from the west. Under Bogner, sheep raising was abandoned in favour of horses and cattle, but the station never made a profit.

Strehlow married Frieda on 25 September 1895.)

Although Strehlow took over as manager in 1901 after Bogner had left, he continued to play the dominant role in the religious life of Hermannsburg, which – in keeping with his predecessors – he conceived of as a place of care for the old, cure for the sick, and lastly, but most importantly, a religious centre where the Aranda people could hear the gospel preached in their own language. As manager as well as missionary, he kept a close eye on all developments – working out policy regarding conversions, station regulations, as well as making sure the stockmen on this property of 1,200 mi^{2} (3,100 km^{2}) were not doing deals with the neighbouring cattle stations.

Strehlow's missionary work was closely bound up with his study of languages, which derived from his role as a teacher, using and later translating material into the local language, which was then printed. This meant he had to work closely with the older generation, who were the best speakers of the language, putting him in an unusual relationship with them, since usually they were not interested in Christianity at all. In practice, this meant that Strehlow's teaching of Christianity became strongly influenced by them and their knowledge. He concluded that their language "has passed its flowering and is now falling into decay", and felt he had to investigate their culture to understand why.

He learned three Aboriginal languages: Dieri, Aranda and Loritja. Contrary to much in print, he did not go out proselytising, believing that interest had to come from the people themselves: he did not want large numbers of "converts" paying only lip-service to Christianity. Those who converted were expected to reside permanently at the Mission, going away "for a spell" only after arranging it with him; their children had to come regularly to school where they learned to read and write in their own language, and the men had to be gainfully employed. At Bethesda, this meant working as shepherds, shearers, trackers, and builders, and at Hermannsburg working as stockmen, branding, mustering, digging out the waterholes during the droughts, droving stock south to Oodnadatta, tracking, and also helping to construct Hermannsburg's stone buildings, unlike Bethesda where mud bricks were used. Since the Mission always supplied those working with food and clothes and likewise their families, relatives not working were not allowed to share the food with them. Meals were served three times a day in the Esshaus, supervised mostly by Strehlow himself to prevent arguments. The government gave the Mission an annual grant of £300 to support the aged and infirm; all school children were fed and clothed. Frieda too became a fluent speaker of Aranda and exercised great influence on the young women and girls, opposing the widespread practice of infanticide (especially the killing of twins), teaching them basic skills like sewing and mending, emphasising the need for hygiene – daily washing, clean clothes, and so on – as well as how to raise their children using nappies. In this way, she overcame the high infant mortality which had led anthropologists and others to refer to aborigines as a ‘doomed race’. Religious instruction took place in the native languages and was a lengthy process of years, with people baptized only after they had proved that they were serious and not just trying to get food. Increasingly, senior members of the Christian community like Moses Tjalkabota and Nathanael Rauwiraka played a part in instructing new converts, and worked with Strehlow on his translations of religious texts.

A vital aspect of Strehlow's work was his attitude to those who did not wish to convert, such as visiting relatives from other parts. Contrary to practice elsewhere, he did not believe in preventing them from coming to the Mission and, though not keen on them performing ceremonies, did not interfere as long as these took place some distance from the mission buildings. Initiation continued to be carried out, and is so to this day. These people camped by Finke River to the west of the compound and supported themselves by hunting and gathering edible plants. Some were employed for years but never converted: they received food and clothing for themselves and their families and their children were encouraged to go to school.

=== Linguistic studies and translations ===
A gifted linguist, Strehlow began his Dieri studies using material produced by earlier missionaries like Koch and Flierl I, while for Aranda he used the existing printed school material as well as Hermann Kempe's 1891 grammar and accompanying vocabulary, published by the Royal Society of South Australia. This, in turn, was derived in part from Koch's Dieri studies and also from Meyer's grammar of the Encounter Bay language, Narrinyeri. Probably around 1897, Strehlow wrote a comparative grammar of Aranda and Dieri; this was followed by his Aranda-Loritja grammar of 1910. His correspondence with Siebert on these and related matters seems to have been lost, but it is clear he worked closely with him until Siebert returned to Germany in April 1902 due to ill health. Apart from his work in the Aranda language, Strehlow also made the first detailed study of the Loritja (Western Desert) language, drawing up extensive vocabularies and grammars for both languages. His work in the Loritja language became the basis for the various studies of Western Desert languages done in the second half of the twentieth century. Strehlow's vocabularies of the three languages he specialised in are possibly the largest collection of Aboriginal words ever assembled, comprising some 7,600 words in Aranda, 6,300 in Loritja and 1,300 in Dieri, making more than 15,000 words in total. This was intended to be an integral part of Strehlow's book Die Aranda- und Loritja-Stämme in Zentral-Australien (The Aranda and Loritja Tribes in Central Australia). Due to Leonhardi's untimely death on 27 October 1910, (Note: Date taken from his tombstone in the cemetery at Gross Karben.) two weeks before he and Strehlow were to meet for the first time, the book was left without an editor committed to the original vision, so none of this material was ever published. Instead, it became the foundation of his son T. G. H. Strehlow's work, providing much material for Aranda Traditions and Songs of Central Australia. It was also used by later missionaries, including the Presbyterians at Ernabella.

As a development of his work translating Christian religious material into Aranda and Dieri, like his antecedents Koch and Johannes Flierl I at Bethesda, and Kempe, Schwarz and Schulze at Hermansburg, Strehlow also recorded the sacred chants used in Aranda ceremonies and translated them into German. This was the first successful recording of this material, thought by Kempe to be in a language which had been lost. Spencer and Gillen famously described the Aranda as "naked savages... chanting songs of which they do not know the meaning", and used it as proof that they were a primitive people left behind in the Darwinist struggle for survival. Strehlow showed that the material was encoded to make it impossible for it to be understood without special instruction from the Old Men, who alone knew its meaning, jealously guarding this knowledge to stop the power ascribed to the chants falling into the wrong hands; this device was effective despite the chants being learned by heart by the men taking part in the ceremonies. Strehlow was instructed in this by senior men at Hermannsburg, notably Loatjira, whose information is strewn throughout Strehlow's book. He also recorded his informants' descriptions of ceremonies and initiation rites, in places using interlinear texts, thus preserving forms which today have the status of classics due to changes in the language. He took a keen interest in etymology, and his book is peppered throughout with footnotes explaining etymological points in fine detail. Among the anomalies of Strehlow's career was his refusal to personally attend ceremonies on the grounds that it was unfitting for a missionary, despite his intense interest in them and the detailed descriptions given in his book.

=== Anthropology ===
He collaborated with Moritz, Baron von Leonhardi of Gross Karben in Hessen, Germany, who also suggested he write his monumental anthropological work Die Aranda- und Loritja-Stämme in Zentral-Australien (The Aranda and Loritja Tribes in Central Australia). With Leonhardi as editor, this work became the first publication of the newly founded Städtisches Völkermuseum (Municipal Ethnological Museum) of Frankfurt am Main, appearing in eight parts between 1907 and 1920. Strehlow sent what was said to be the best collection in the world of Aboriginal artefacts – both sacred and secular – to Frankfurt, unfortunately largely destroyed in the bombing of the city in World War Two, though some fine pieces remain. Due to Leonhardi's sudden death in 1910, Strehlow's linguistic researches intended as part of Die Aranda- und Loritja-Stämme were never published, though used in manuscript form by his son T. G. H. (Ted) Strehlow and later Hermannsburg missionaries. Strehlow's knowledge of languages and rapport with senior men like Loatjira, Tmala and (for Loritja) Talku enabled him to publish a major tract on the legends, beliefs, customs, genealogies, secret initiatory life and magical practices of the peoples on the Mission in his book. The book was published in instalments between 1907 and 1920 and came about as the result of correspondence between Strehlow and the German gentleman scholar Moritz von Leonhardi. To clarify certain confusions surrounding this work, it was written by Strehlow, edited by Leonhardi, and published in sections between 1907 and 1920 under the auspices of Frankfurt's newly established Städtisches Völkermuseum (Municipal Ethnological Museum). Thanks to Leonhardi's contacts with Prof. Bernhard Hagen at the museum, the printing costs were financed by the Anthropological Society of Frankfurt, at that time playing an important role in the cultural life of Frankfurt and supported by wealthy benefactors, some from Frankfurt's prominent Jewish families. In return, the museum obtained a major collection of artefacts and sacred objects at a reduced price, unfortunately largely destroyed in World War Two. These included the usual spears, boomerangs, woomeras, digging sticks, stone knives and everyday objects, but also tjurungas, ceremonial objects and decorations of various kinds which were usually destroyed when the ceremony was finished, kurdaitcha boots, pointing sticks and so on with a view to enabling Europeans to get a full and comprehensive picture of Aranda and Loritja people and their inner world in conjunction with the explanations in the book.

After the export of Indigenous material was restricted by the Act of November 1913, a collection intended for Cologne's Rautenstrauch-Joest Museum was impounded at Port Adelaide, and was purchased by the South Australian Museum. Strehlow's genealogical records of long-dead Aranda men and women dating back to around the beginning of the nineteenth century are possibly the most exhaustive for anywhere in Australia and of priceless value to their descendants today; unfortunately, they were heavily cut when published, but the originals survive in the Strehlow Research Centre in Alice Springs.

Strehlow's book challenged some of the findings of Walter Baldwin Spencer and Francis James Gillen in their highly acclaimed work The Native Tribes of Central Australia, at that time accepted as the last word on the Aranda. This led to a major controversy in London anthropological circles involving Andrew Lang, Sir James Frazer, Robert Ranulph Marett, (Note: Written A.A. Marett, but must be this man.) A.C. Haddon, Spencer and later Bronisław Malinowski. Central to the debate was the question of whether Aboriginal people were primitive people on a lower level to Europeans (Frazer and Spencer's view) or a decadent people who had previously been on a higher level of culture (Strehlow's view, based on his knowledge of the language). Strehlow's researches were taken up by Andrew Lang and N.W. Thomas in England, by Émile Durkheim, Marcel Mauss and Arnold van Gennep in France, by Fritz Graebner in Germany and Pater W. Schmidt in Austria, and were a major source for Bronislaw Malinowski's The Family among Australian Aborigines. A translation of Die Aranda- und Loritja-Stämme into English was completed in 1991 by Rev. Hans D. Oberscheidt and is still awaiting publication.

Strehlow wrote an account of the 1875 "massacre of Running Waters", in which 80 to 100 Arrernte men, women and children of the Southern Aranda language group were killed by a raiding party of 50 to 60 Matuntara warriors at Irbmangkara, a permanent water stretch of the Finke River.

For Strehlow and his wife Frieda, the period 1912 to 1922 was dominated by Spencer's attempts to shut the Mission down. In his 1913 report as Special Commissioner and Chief Protector of Aborigines, Spencer proposed taking all Aboriginal children away from their parents and setting up reserves where the children would be denied any contact with their parents, be prevented from speaking their languages and made incapable of living in the bush. While recognising that "this will undoubtedly be a difficult matter to accomplish and will involve some amount of hardship so far as the parents are concerned”, Spencer justified it on the grounds that "once the children have grown to a certain age and have become accustomed to camp life with its degrading environment and endless roaming about in the bush, it is almost useless to try and reclaim them". So he thought it essential to take them away, for "then they will gradually lose the longing for a nomad life and will in fact become incapable of securing their living in the bush". He was particularly keen to make sure that "half-caste" children had no contact with camp life. Hermannsburg was to be taken away from the Lutherans and "serve as a reserve for the remnants of the southern central tribes where they can, under proper and competent control, be trained to habits of industry".

A series of investigations was arranged to give the Mission a bad name. However, when the Administrator of the Northern Territory, John A. Gilruth, came down from Darwin in 1913 to see whether these negative reports were true, he was impressed with what he saw and decided that the Strehlows and the Mission should remain. From 1914 Ida Standley was running her half-caste school in Alice Springs, so the next plan was that she should take over at Hermannsburg. Strehlow's response to her when she visited was: "To separate the black children from their parents and forbid them to speak Aranda to each other, and where possible drive the old people away from the station, I will never consent to. My mission instructions are, to preach the gospel to the whole creation, which is only possible in an effective way in the native language. This practice is followed in missions everywhere too, except in Australia, which takes a unique position on this as in much else".

=== World War One ===
Owing to the remoteness of Hermannsburg, in 1910 the Strehlow children were taken by their parents to Germany to receive a proper education. Only the youngest – Theo (Ted) – came back with them in 1911. During the war, Germans and persons of German descent were subjected to a sustained campaign of denigration and oppression, with many interned in camps where, at times, they received harsh treatment. With the eldest son Friedrich in the German army from mid-1915, the Strehlows became the target of rumour, despite Carl being naturalised in 1901, and many attempts, some inspired by Spencer, were made to discredit him and the Mission with a view to shutting it down. The transfer of the Northern Territory from South Australia to the Commonwealth of Australia on 1 January 1911 meant that discriminatory laws were harder to introduce there. Strehlow was fortunate in having the support of Sergeant Robert Stott, the policeman in Alice Springs, and most importantly, Administrator Gilruth, who was an admirer of his work at Hermannsburg, much to Spencer's chagrin, who had put his former colleague's name forward for the position in 1911. However, after the war, finding a successor for Strehlow was almost impossible due to a ban on German immigration. Although originally contracted to stay only until 1920, when he, Frieda and Theo (Ted) would return to Germany, Strehlow was obliged to stay on indefinitely.

== Marriage and children ==
Strehlow and Frieda Johanna Henrietta Keysser first met when he visited the vicarage at Obersulzbach in Franconia on Maundy Thursday, 14 April 1892, staying only until Saturday 16 when he went to Neundettelsau to receive his Aussegnung on Easter Day. Orphaned since 1889, Frieda, who was only 16, was working as a housekeeper for her great-uncle, Rev. August Omeis and his wife, and was busy dyeing Easter eggs with Marie Eckardt, the previous housekeeper, who was about to leave for Australia to marry one of Strehlow's fellow students, Friedrich Leidig. It was love at first sight for the couple. At the end of 1892, Strehlow wrote to Rev. Omeis asking for Frieda's hand in marriage but was refused on the grounds that she was too young, and in any case the couple hardly knew each other. Despite continuing determined opposition from Frieda's family, who thought the whole idea a silly adolescent obsession, Strehlow was eventually allowed to write to her and the two became engaged, but it was made clear that she could not marry before her twentieth birthday on 31 August 1895. The entire courtship was conducted by letter. On 5 August, she set off with Rev. Omeis and her Aunt Augusta's husband Rev. Gottfried Heckel to take the boat from Genoa in Italy, travelling with yet another future missionary's wife, Marie Zahn, to South Australia.

On 25 September 1895, she was married by Leidig to Carl at Point Pass on the edge of the Barossa Valley in a double wedding with Marie and her husband Otto Siebert, another of Strehlow's former fellow students now at Bethesda. Despite Frieda's initial doubts about what she had done in marrying a man she knew only from letters, the marriage was happy and blessed with six children: Friedrich (born 1897), Martha (1899), Rudolf (1900), Karl (1902), Hermann (1905) and Theodor aka Ted Strehlow (1908).

== Death and legacy ==
In September 1922, Strehlow became seriously ill with dropsy, and despite efforts to get a car to transport him to Adelaide, on 20 October 1922, he died at Horseshoe Bend Station, halfway to Oodnadatta while trying to reach medical help.

=== Natural history collections ===
Strehlow sent a considerable number of specimens of both fauna and flora to Leonhardi, who lodged it in Frankfurt's Naturmuseum Senckenberg, with some material also going to Berlin, and the botanical gardens in Darmstadt. Although most were already classified, some were not, and included reptiles such as Gehyra moritzi and Ctenotus leonhardii. Once World War One had begun, sending material to Germany was no longer possible, so material was sent to Edgar Waite, director of the South Australian Museum, including rare species such as Ramphotyphlos endoterus. Other material from Strehlow was obtained via Frederick Scarfe of the Adelaide firm Harris, Scarfe & Co.

== In the arts ==
The trip by horse and buggy and Strehlow's painful death is described in his son Ted's 1969 book, Journey to Horseshoe Bend.

Journey to Horseshoe Bend was turned into a cantata of the same name by Gordon Williams and Andrew Schulz, and premiered in the Sydney Opera House in May 2003, performed by the Hermannsburg Ladies Choir and starring Aaron Pedersen. It was commissioned by Symphony Australia for performance by Sydney Symphony Orchestra, funded by the Australia Council.

The first half of a double biography of Strehlow and his wife Frieda, The Tale of Frieda Keysser, based in large part on Frieda's diaries from the period, was published by grandson John Strehlow in 2012, with the second volume published in 2019.

Stephen Orr's 2026 novel The Night Parrots is based on Journey to Horseshoe Bend. According to the author, the novel is primarily "the story of a father and a son".

== Works ==
- J.G. Reuther, C. Strehlow [translators]: Testamenta marra : Jesuni Christuni ngantjani jaura ninaia karitjimalkana wonti Dieri jaurani
- Strehlow: Die Grammatik der Aranda-Sprache, comparison of Aranda language with Dieri and Encounter Bay
- Strehlow: Woerterbuch der Aranda und Loritja Sprachen
- Strehlow, Kempe: Galtjindintjamea-Pepa Aranda Wolambarinjaka (book of worship)
- Strehlow: Pepa Aragulinja Aranda Katjirberaka (School primer, published 1928)
- Strehlow, Carl; Leonhardi, Moritz; Städtisches Völkermuseum (Frankfurt am Main, Germany) (1907–1920). Die Aranda- und Loritja-Stamme in Zentral-Australien. Joseph Baer & Co.
- Ewangelia Lukaka. (Gospel of St. Luke in the Aranda or Arunta language.), 1925. London: B. & F.B.S.
- Ewangelia Taramatara(four gospels in Aranda), 1928 London: B. & F.B.S.

== See also ==
- History of the Lutheran Church of Australia
