= Hermann Kempe =

German missionary in Australia (1844–1928)

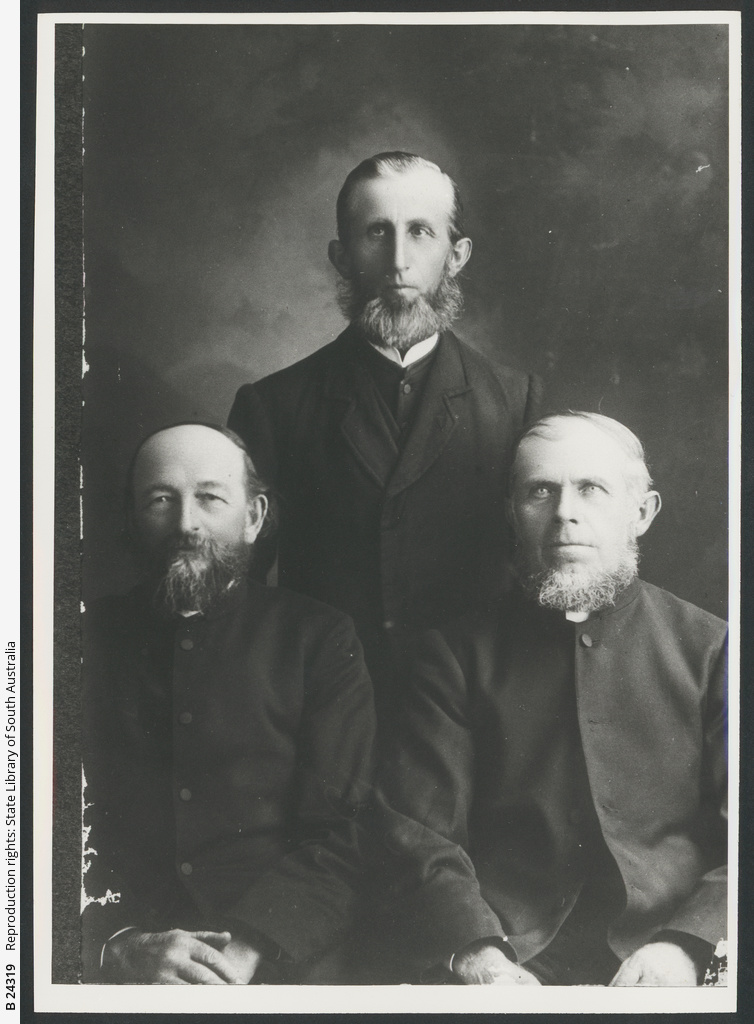
Pastors H. Kempe, W.F. Schwarz and L.G. Schulze, first missionaries at Finke River Mission, c 1880

Friedrich Adolf Hermann Kempe, known as Hermann Kempe, (26 March 1844 – 8 March 1928) was a Lutheran missionary and pastor who co-founded the Hermannsburg Lutheran Mission, now Ntaria community, in Central Australia. He lived there from 1877 to 1893.

== Early life ==
Kempe was born in Deuben, Germany and, after completing his schooling, worked first at a coal mine before becoming apprenticed as a joiner. In this role he travelled significantly and converted to Christianity which led to him beginning study at the Hermannsburg Mission Seminary in December 1870; he was ordained on 6 May 1875.

Kempe emigrated to Australia in 1875 where he settled in South Australia. He had sailed there from Hamburg, leaving there on 21 July, and arrived in Glenelg on 16 September. He travelled alongside Wilhelm F. Schwarz who would later join him at Hermannsburg and three other graduates of the seminary.

== Life in the Northern Territory ==
In 1877 he co-founded the Hermannsburg Lutheran mission, and travelled there alongside Schwarz. To get there they travelled over 1,760 kilometres (1,090 mi) with 37 horses, 20 cattle, nearly 2000 sheep, 5 dogs and chickens that were to be used to establish the mission and make it as self-sufficient as possible. About half way it was recorded that their procession was approximately 300 kilometres (190 mi) apart.

This journey took them 20 months and they arrived on 4 June 1977 at their selected location and began building soon after.

On 10 April 1878 Kempe was joined by his fiancée, Marie Henriette Dorothea Queckenstedt (primarily recorded as Dorothee), who he married on her journey there at Dalhousie Springs around 1 March 1878. At their wedding ceremony they used water canteens for an altar and decorated a tent with greenery. Dorothee had travelled there alongside Johanne Wilhelmine Schulze who married Schwarz and they became the first European women to settle in Central Australia.

While at Hermannsburg Kempe became a plant collector (including mosses and algae) and a contributor to the Natural History Museum, via Ferdinand von Mueller. Currently the National Herbarium of Victoria holds more than 800 of his specimens. He also published on this topic including 'Plants indigenous to the neighbourhood of Hermannsburg, on the River Finke, Central Australia' which was published by the Philosophical Society of Adelaide in 1880.

He also learned to speak and read the Arrernte language and delivered sermons to the Arrernte people living at the mission in this language. Some of the earliest pieces that Kempe translated were Christmas carols and hymns which were first sung at the Christmas Eve service in 1880. One of the men to teach him Arrernte was Tjita Aranaljika, the father of Moses Tjalkabota, who was also inspired by Kempe. While language learning took place Kempe also attempted to bridge the language gap using coloured drawings to illustrate the bible.

Kempe also published a guide to grammar and a dictionary of the language entitled 'A Grammar and Vocabulary of the Language Spoken by the Aborigines of the MacDonnell Ranges, South Australia' (1890) which contained approximately 2,000 Arrernte words. He also published the first book of Christian instruction in Arrernte in entitled 'Galtjintana-pepa : kristianirberaka mbontala(1891). This was later used by Carl Strehlow, who joined the mission after Kempe had departed, in his Arrernte service book Galtjindinjamea-pepa: Aranda-Wolambarinjaka' (1904).

The first baptism of people living at the mission took place on 30 May 1881 when seven teenagers chose to. He later baptised Moses Tjalkabota on 26 December 1890.

The mission struggled to remain viable and, the missionaries and their families in particular, struggled with poor health. Around 1889 one of Kempe's sons, then 6 years old, died of typhoid fever and on 13 November 1891, just after the birth of her sixth child, Dorothee died also. There were also ongoing issues with he, and the other missionaries, relationship with the Hermannsburg Mission in Germany who withdrew their support for how missionaries children and idows would be cared for in case of their death. It was during this period that Kempe decided he wanted to leave Hermannsburg but he had initially wanted to wait until a suitable replacement was found but departed very soon after his wife's death.

== Later life ==
After leaving Hermannsburg Kempe settled in Adelaide in 1892 and, soon after, married Sohpie Kunz, who Dorothee had suggested he marry. Before their marriage she had been living in Africa. Together they travelled to various Lutheran parishes in South Australia for the next five years until 1895 when they settled in Balaklava and built a home. Sophie died in 1913 and Kempe remarried to Bertha Hansen in 1914.

Kempe retired in 1924 after deciding that he was getting too old and he still struggled with the English language and was now being asked to deliver sermons in it. Later that year he suffered from a stroke which left him partially paralyzed and he had to re-learn how to speak, following this, in 1926 Bertha died. Kempe died in 1928 after having a second stroke.

== Publications about ==
Kempe published an autobiography in the German language which was later translated into English by PA Sherer: 'From joiner's bench to pulpit' (1973).

== Legacy ==
Kempe Street in Alice Springs (Mparntwe) is named for him.
