= Moses Tjalkabota =

Australian Aboriginal evangelist (c. 1869–1954)

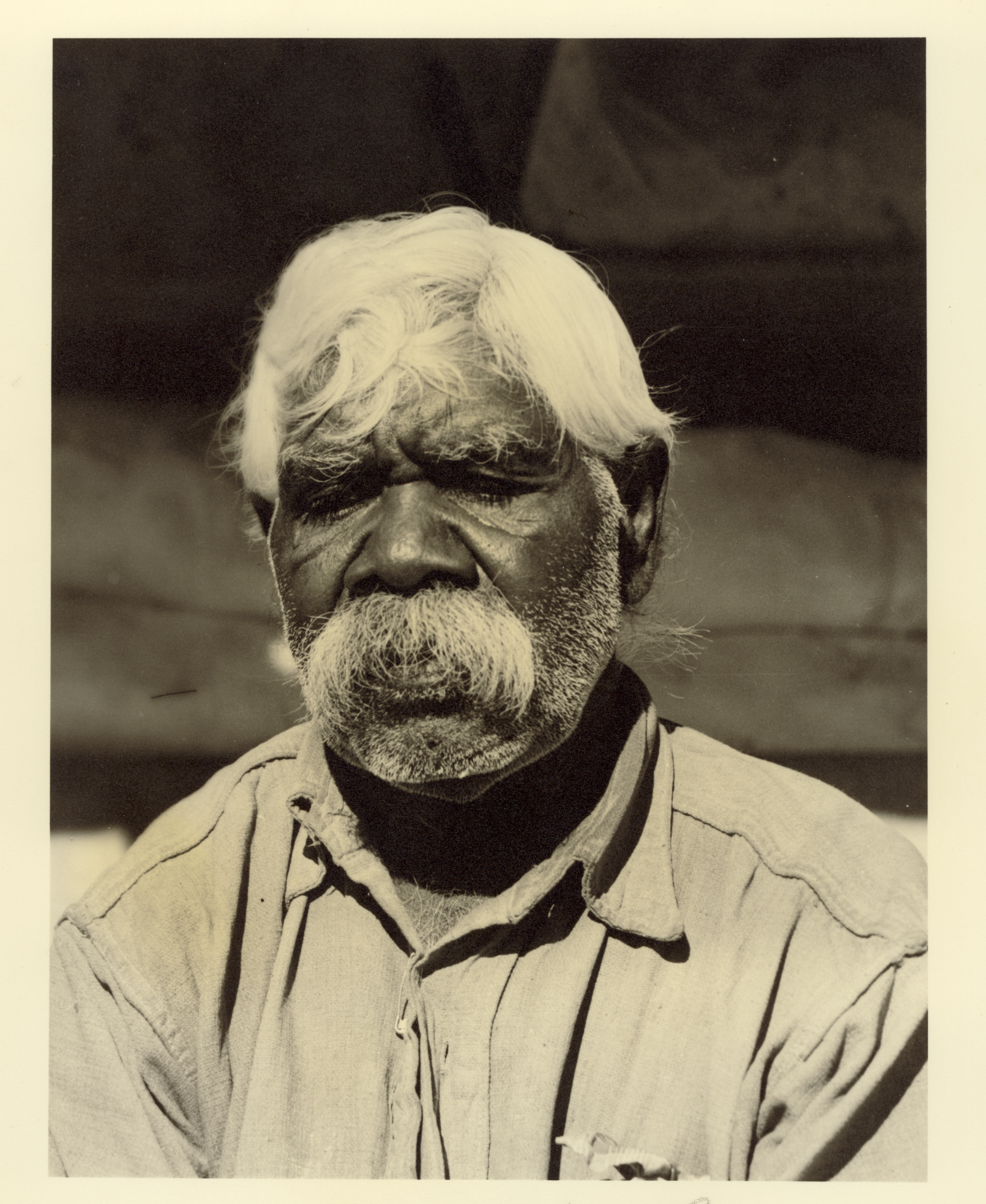
Moses Tjalkabota pictured in 1946

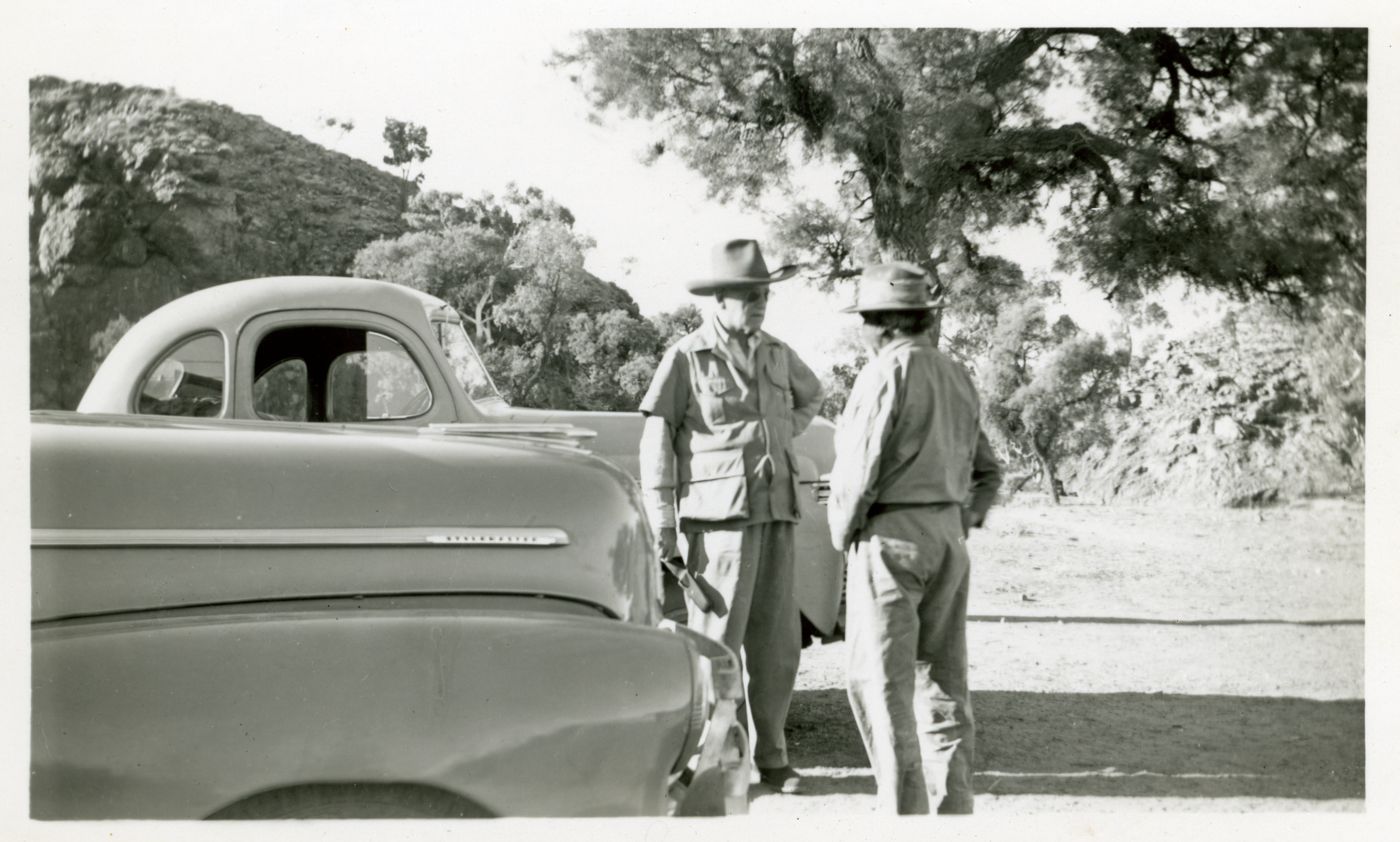
Moses Tjalkabota and Sir Willoughby Norrie in 1951

Moses Tjalkabota, also known as Moses Tjalkabota Uraikuria or Blind Moses (c.1869 - 6 July 1954) was a Western Arrernte man and Australian Aboriginal evangelist who was born at Laprapuntja (Ellery Creek), east of Hermannsburg (Ntaria).

In the course of his work he came to be known as "Central Australia's most gifted evangelist" and it is said that he was a master storyteller and he attracted large crowds when he preached.

== Biography ==
Tjalkabota was the fourth of five children born to Tjita and Aranaljika and his name, Tjalkabota, translates as 'best juiciest piece of meat' in Western Arrernte. On Christmas Day in 1890, when his age was stated to be 12, he was baptised and chose the name Mose; this is the German form of Moses. It is believed that he was older than 12 for, as recorded by Paul Albrecht (the Superintendent of the Finke River Mission) as he held clear recollections of the Irpmankara massacre in around 1875; this is also known as the Massacre of Running Waters.

In his early life Tjalkabota followed the traditional nomadic patters of his people and, when first meeting with white men, when he saw them in his country in July 1876, he recalled:

We thought that the white men were black men who had died, and then returned as spirits to the place where they had died long ago. First up, we went to the hills, afraid. We stayed there in the hills and made camp.

— Moses Tjalkabota, as quoted in 'Blind Moses' by Peter Latz (2014), p. 21

In June 1877 Tjalkabota and his family met for the first time with the German missionaries who had newly arrived at Hermannsburg and his father, Tjita, performed some early translation work for them in exchange for food and clothes; his father called clothing "different skin". Tjalkabota's parents were first resistant to the missionaries wanting Tjalkabota, and his siblings, to attend school but relented and they began attending classes. As a part of these classes he was taught the Christian faith and he was immediately interested; the first song he learned was perhaps the only translated hymn at that time called Jesuai, nauna pitjai [Jesus come to us]. Tjita did not approve of this and took him away from the school and they returned to Laprapuntja.

Without his father's permission Tjalkabota later returned to school and soon became a Christian. While living there he worked in the garden and as a shepherd and in 1891, after his parents returned to Laprapuntja, he remained there. In 1903 he married Sofia (Sophie) Ingkamala, an Arrernte woman. He also began assisting Carl Strehlow with his translation of the New Testament and many hymns into Western Arrernte and he did so for many years. He said of this work:

We taught [Mr Strehlow] word the old men had not put down - kaiaka (blameless) and aratjantataka (righteousness) and aluaka ilknama (to shed or sprinkle blood) ... During the day we worked outside and Mr Strehlow taught in the school. Then in the evening we came to him to write down these words,

— Moses Tjalkabota, as quoted in 'Blind Moses' by Peter Latz (2014), p. 72

In 1905, following suffering from heat stroke, he became blind and began to work as a catechist and lay preacher at the mission. After the death of Carl Strehlow Tjalkabota assisted the newly arrived FW Albrecht in translating and reading his sermons for him until he learned enough Western Arrernte to do so himself.

This was, until, on a visit to Horseshoe Bend Station he was persuaded to stay and act as an evangelist. This became a regular occurrence and Tjalkabota would travel regularly to minister to Aboriginal people (mostly Arrernte people) throughout the region. He travelled by donkey, camel, buggy, on foot and even occasionally on the back of a truck; he is best remembered for his use of the donkey. He visited places such as Arltunga, Deep Well Station, Jay Creek, Undoolya Station and Alice Springs.

A large part of Tjalkabota's message to other Aboriginal people was to place their trust in Jesus and give up their tjurunga and this message was oftentimes met with rejection. It is said that his catch-phrase was 'Churinga [tjurunga] or Christ?'.

From April 1932 he also assisted Ted Strehlow in his anthropological work; Ted Strehlow drew on his knowledge of both Arrernte and Luritja to compare the names of totem plants and animals in both languages and also for his knowledge of tribal boundaries and matters relating to tjurunga. They also worked together to record and document Rain Dreaming songs associated with the nearby Kaporilja Springs [see: Kuprilya Springs Pipeline].

In the 1940s, until his death in 1954, he worked as a preacher, in charge of a small church, and teacher to children at Jay Creek.

On his death Paul Albrecht said of him:

A man with the knowledge and character of Moses cannot be re-placed, but what he brought as a blessing to his people will live on

— Paul Albrecht, Centralian Advocate, 9 July 1954

His funeral was held at Hermannsburg and it is said that "most of the western group" of Arrernte people attended.

== Resources about ==
A biography of Tjalkabota was published by Peter Latz (botanist) in 2014:

- Latz, P. K. (Peter Kenneth) (2014). Blind Moses : Moses Tjalkabota Uraiakuraia, Aranda man of high degree and Christian evangelist. Peter Latz, [Alice Springs, Northern Territory].
