= Kuprilya Springs Pipeline =

Pipeline in Australia's Northern Territory

Coordinates: 23°56′35″S 132°46′40″E

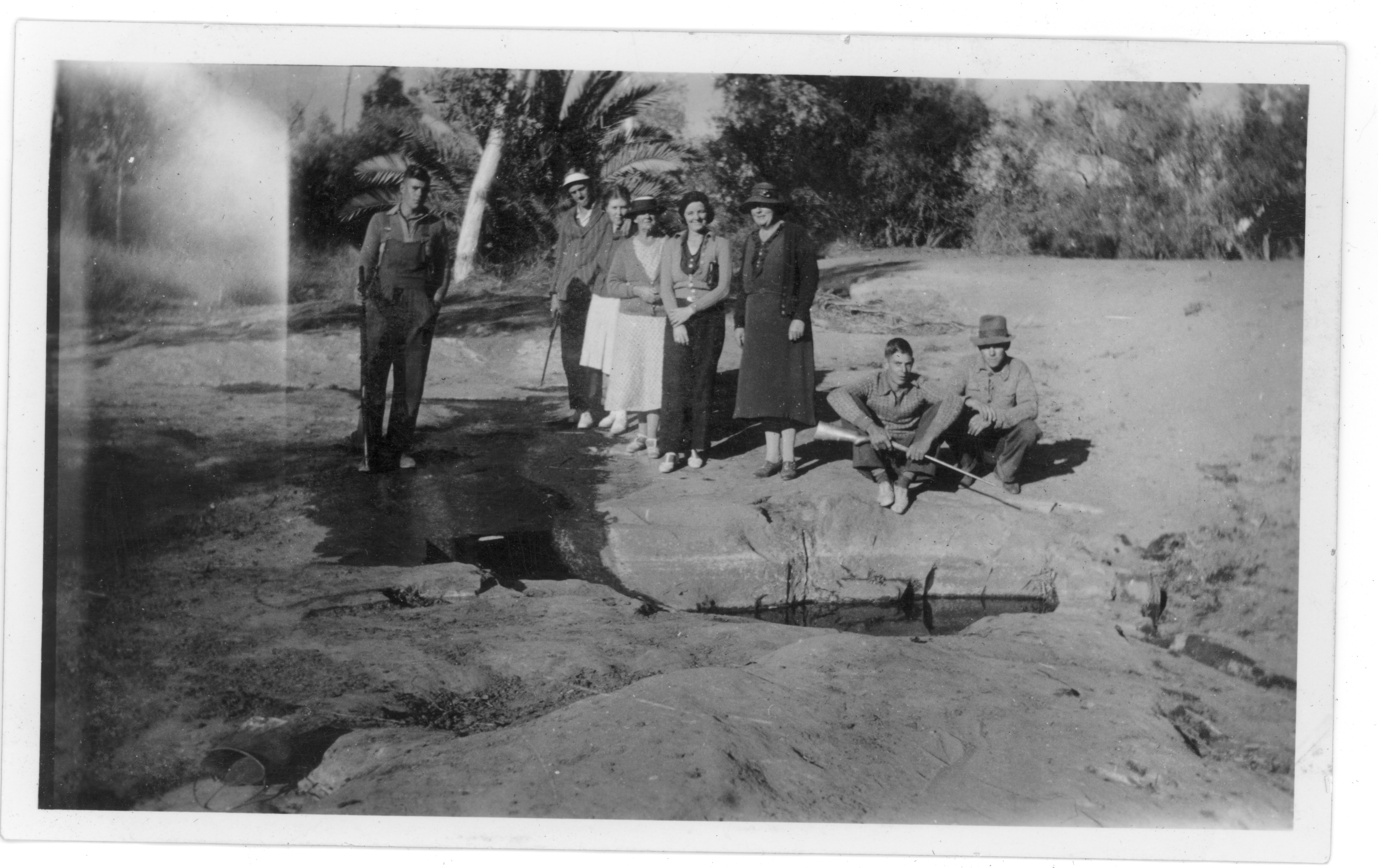
Kuprilya Springs which the pipeline flows from, with people standing by it, in 1938

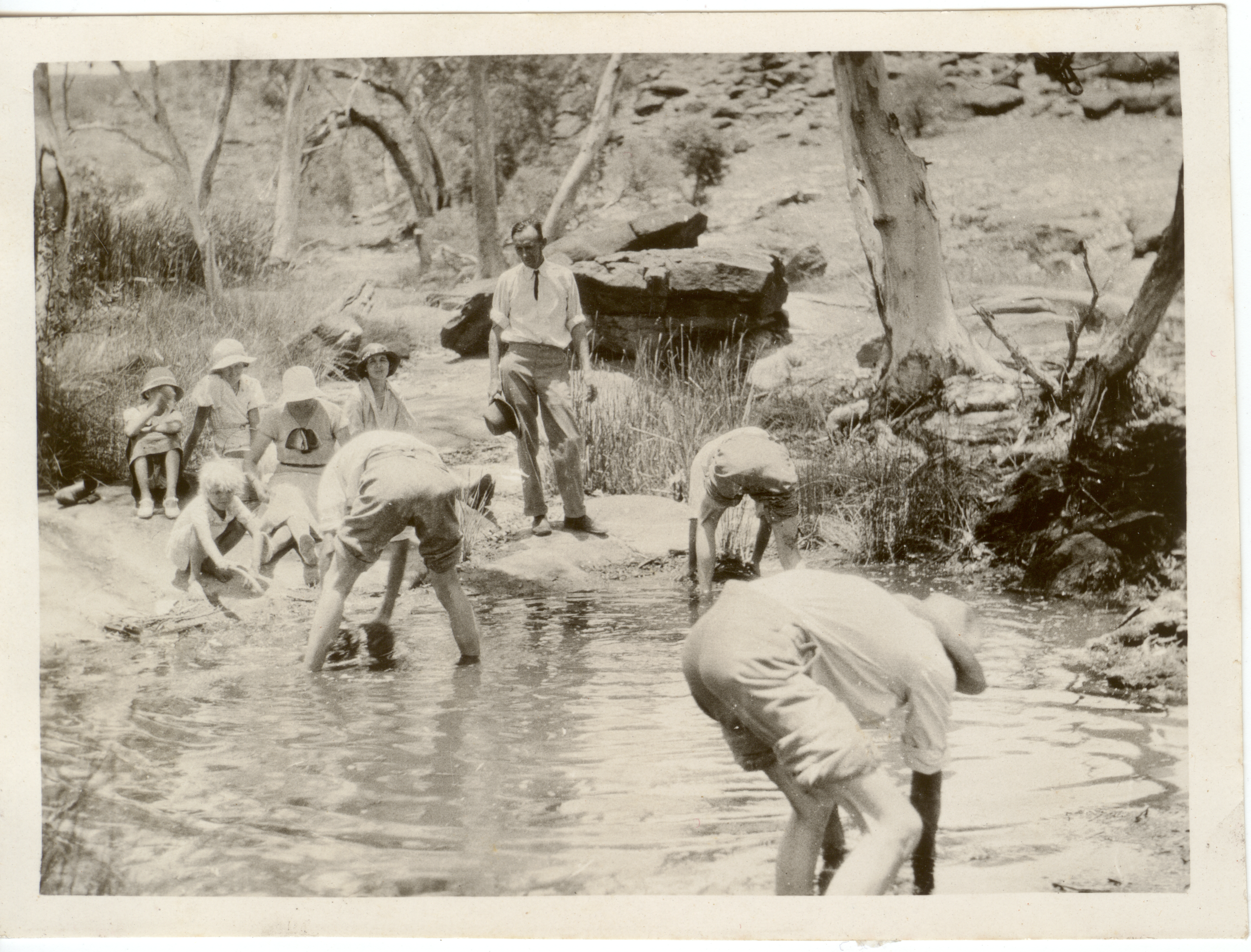
People, likely the family of Gerhardt Johannsen, catching yabbies at Kuprilya Springs

The Kuprilya Springs Pipeline, sometimes spelled Kaporilja, is a pipeline in the Northern Territory of Australia which runs between the Kuprilya Springs to Hermannsburg, which was then functioning as a Lutheran Mission, that was constructed between 1934 and 1935. Kuprilya Springs and Hermannsburg (Ntaria) are both of the traditional lands of the Western Arrarnta people.

== History ==
Hermannsburg Mission, which also functioned as a cattle station, was established on 4 June 1877 and, between then and 1926 suffered many droughts that caused them to struggle to stay viable while, at the same time, meaning that many Aboriginal people came into the mission because of the lack of availability of food and their traditional lands being curtailed by pastoralists. The drought, and subsequent scarcity of water, was so severe in 1926 that the mission was almost forced to close and that many of the people living on the mission suffered from ill health and scurvy. Historian Jose Petrick says that, between 1926 and 1929, that 41 of the 51 children born at the mission died and that, in 1929 alone, 41 people, including both adults and children, died. The scarcity of water also impacted the European population and Pastor Albrecht's own daughter Helene became ill herself and, at the age of four, weighed less than she had at two.

During this time most water used was drawn by hand from wells and soaks in the Finke River bed and a lot of this water contained large amounts of magnesium which made people ill and, as they dried up, increasingly salty.

It is around this time that a pipeline to Kuprilya Springs was given as a solution but there were disagreements between various 'factions' of the Mission Board and also with the government. A large part of the argument was who's responsibility it was to provide water and who would pay for it. As they argued the drought worsened.

In 1929, after the completion of the railway to Alice Springs, Hermannsburg was visited by Melbourne artist Jessie Traill and her friend Una Teague. Una's sister, Violet Teague, already an established artist rushed to the mission to help and, after hiring a taxi to drive her all the way from Melbourne to Hermannsburg, painted prolifically once there. When in Hermannsburg the Teague sisters and Traill camped and Albert Namatjira was their "guide, camel boy, cook and attendant" on their painting excursions. Violet Teague, in particular, was so well liked by Namatjira and his wife Rubina that they named one of their daughters after her; unfortunately, baby Violet Namatjira died when only 5 months old.

Once back in Melbourne Violet sold the paintings so had worked on there, and others donated by members of the Victorian Artists Society and the exhibition was held at the Athenaeum Gallery; Rex Battarbe also contributed a painting.

In addition to artworks there were various appeals, many of them run in newspapers, and books were also sold. Mrs Aeaneas Gunn gave away many copies of her books for the cause; including autographed copies. They raised enough money to pay for the pipes required for the project.

In December 1934 work on the pipeline finally begun and it was mostly constructed by Aboriginal men from the community who often had to work at night to avoid the heat, it was backbreaking work. The pipeline was completed on 30 September 1935 and, at the estimated time for the water to arrive, nothing happened and Albrecht passed a restless night until the water arrived the next day on 1 October; this is still celebrated as Kuprilya Day in Ntaria.

== Resources about ==
The Western Arrarnta language version of this story, collected by the Living Archive of Aboriginal Languages, is available online: Kwatja, kwatja, kwatja!: Kuprilya kwatja pintja by Helene Burns.
