= Glen Helen Gorge =

Coordinates: 23°41′17″S 132°40′35″E

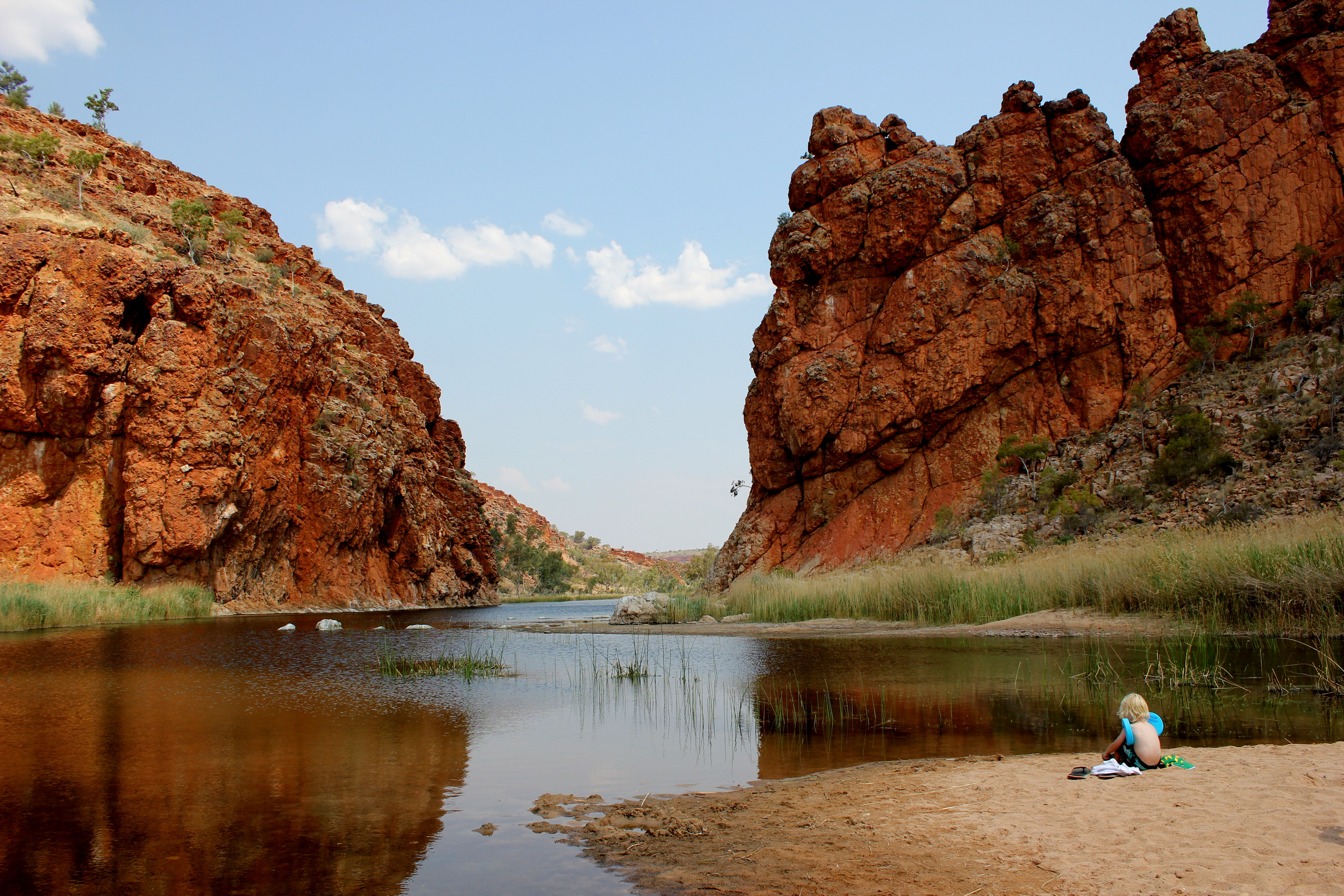

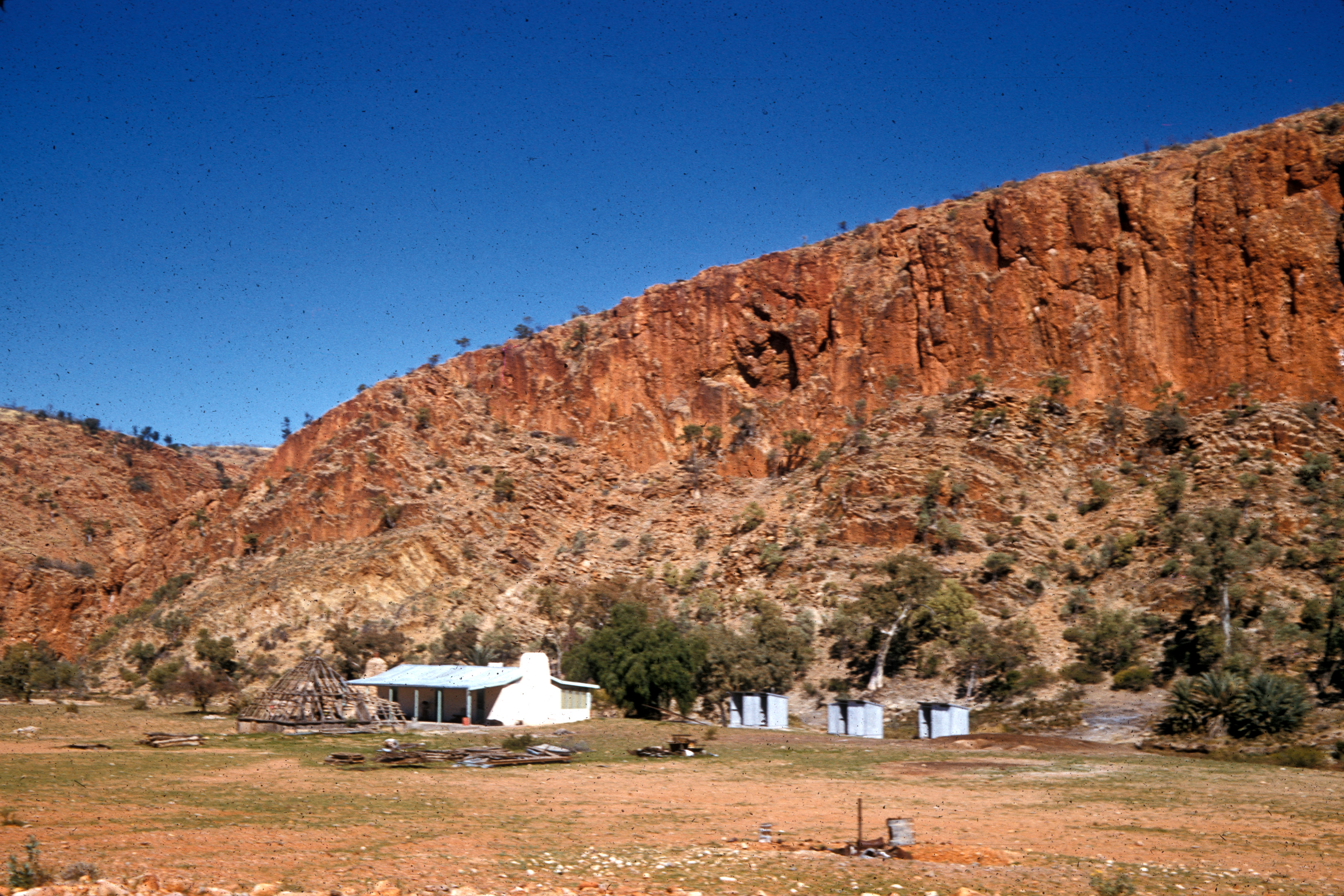
Glen Helen in September 1957

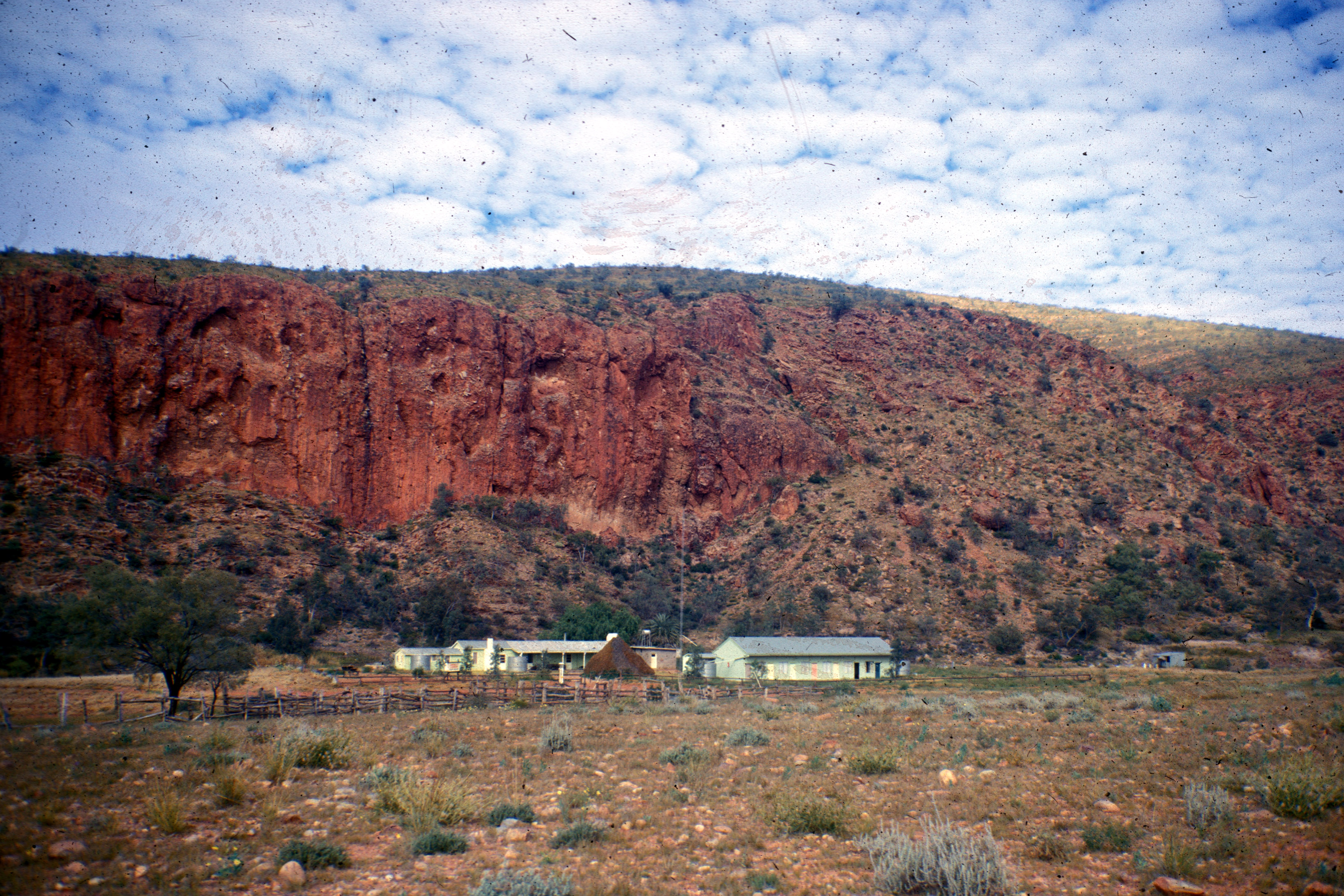
Glen Helen in August 1968

Glen Helen Gorge (Western Arrarnta: Yapalpe), is a natural gorge along the Finke River, located 132 kilometres (82 mi) west of Alice Springs in the Northern Territory of Australia. It lies within the Tjoritja / West MacDonnell National Park.

The traditional owners are the Arrernte people to whom it is culturally signifncant.
