= Hermannsburg, Northern Territory =

Hermannsburg Ntaria (Western Arrarnta)
- Town
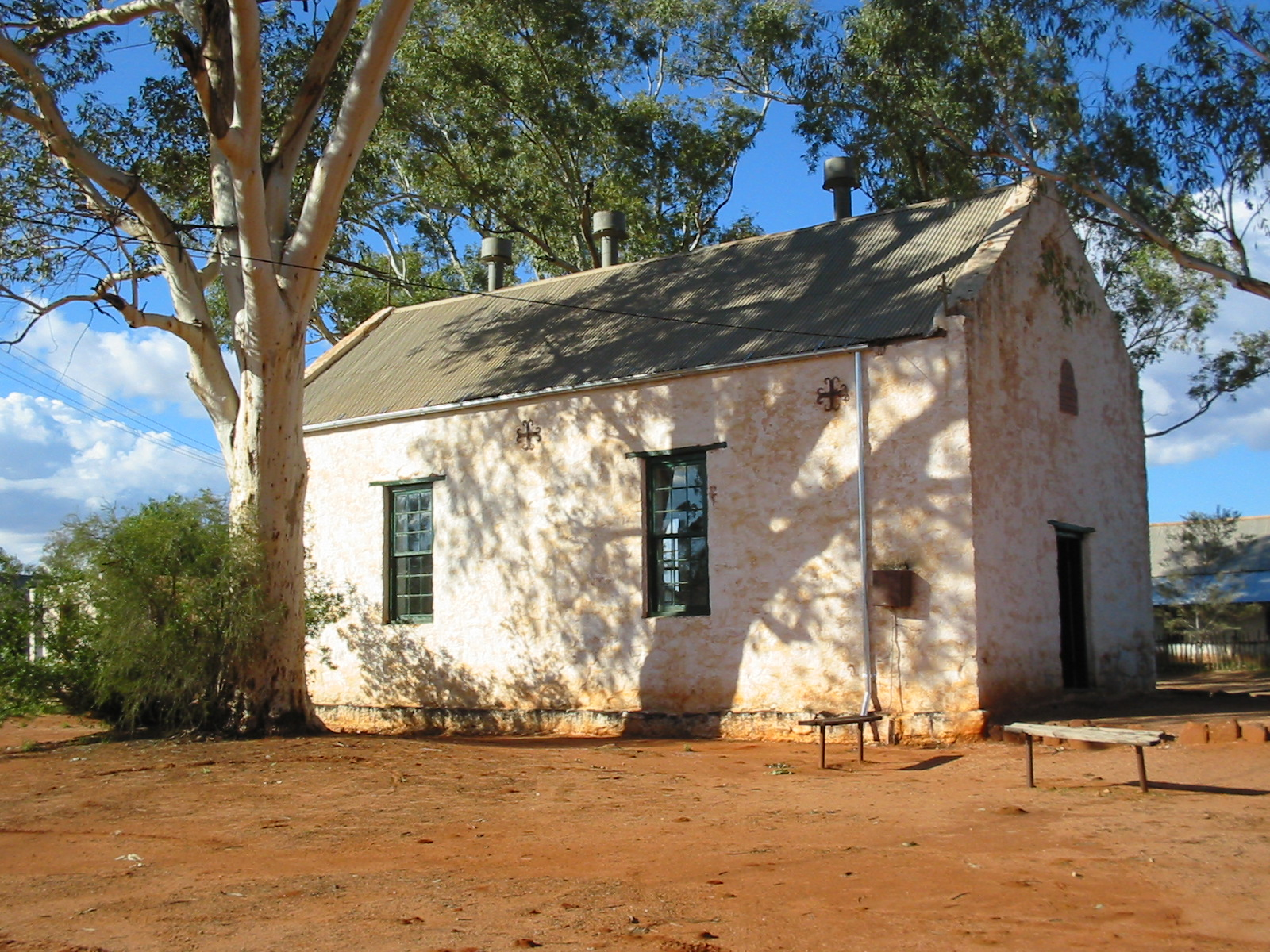
- Hermannsburg Lutheran church

- Coordinates: 23°56′35″S 132°46′40″E
- Country: Australia
- State: Northern Territory
- Location: 131 km (81 mi) from Alice Springs

Government
  - Territory electorate: Namatjira
  - Federal division: Lingiari

Population
  - Total: 551 (2021 census)
- Postcode: 0872

The Hermannsburg Lutheran Church in 1957/1958

Hermannsburg (German: [ˈhɛʁmansˌbʊʁk]; Western Arrarnta: Ntaria), is an Aboriginal community in Ljirapinta Ward of the MacDonnell Shire in the Northern Territory of Australia, 125 kilometres (78 mi); west southwest of Alice Springs, on the Finke River, in the traditional lands of the Western Arrarnta people.

Established as a Lutheran Aboriginal mission in 1877, linguist and anthropologist Carl Strehlow documented the local Western Arrernte language during his time there. The mission was known as Finke River Mission (/ˈfinkə/ FINK-uh; [ˈfɪŋkə]) or Hermannsburg Mission, but the former term was later used to included a few more settlements, and from 2014 has applied to all Lutheran missions in Central Australia.

The land was handed over to traditional ownership in 1982 under the Aboriginal Land Rights Act 1976, and the area is now heritage-listed.

== Geography ==
Hermannsburg lies on the Finke River within the rolling hills of the MacDonnell Ranges in the southern Central Australia region of the Northern Territory.

It is within the jurisdiction of the MacDonnell Regional Council.

== Demographics ==
At the 2011 census, Hermannsburg had a population of 625, of whom 537 (86 per cent) identified as Aboriginal.

By the 2021 census, the suburb had decreased in population to 551, of whom 491 (89.1 per cent) identified as Aboriginal.

== History ==
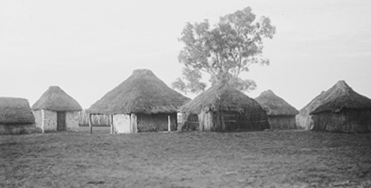
Aboriginal dwellings, 1923

=== 19th century ===
Hermannsburg was established on 4 June 1877 at a sacred site known as Ntaria, which was associated with the Aranda ratapa dreaming. It was conceived as an Aboriginal mission by two Lutheran missionaries, Hermann Kempe (from Dauban, near Dresden) and Wilhelm F. Schwarz (from Württemberg) of the Hermannsburg Mission from Germany, who had travelled overland from Bethany in the Barossa Valley in South Australia. They named their new mission among the Arrernte people after Hermannsburg in Germany where they had trained.

They arrived with 37 horses, 20 cattle and nearly 2000 sheep, five dogs and chickens. Construction began on the first building in late June 1877, made from wood and reed grass. By August a stockyard, kitchen and living quarters were also completed. They had nearly no contact with Aboriginal people in the first few months, although their activities were being observed. At the end of August, a group of 15 Arrernte men visited the mission camping near the settlement. Realising that communication was difficult, the missionaries quickly learnt the local Arrernte language.

A third missionary, Louis Schulze (from Saxony), arrived in Adelaide in October 1877, accompanying three additional lay workers and the wives of Kempe and Schwarz. With the additional workers, five buildings were complete by December 1878. By 1880, a church was constructed with the assistance of Aboriginal labour, and the first church service took place on 12 November, followed by school on 14 November. The first Aboriginal baptisms took place and in 1887 as many as 20 young people were baptised.

A 54-page dictionary of 1750 words was published in 1890. In 1891 the mission published an Arrernte-language book on Christian instruction and worship, containing a catechism, stories from the Bible, psalms, prayers and 53 hymns. In the same year, the Royal Society of South Australia published Schulze's thesis on the habits and customs of the local Aboriginal people and the geography of the Finke River area.

While the population fluctuated, there were always about 100 people living at the mission as pastoralism increased and racial issues developed. Hostilities escalated in 1883 during a drought which saw local Aboriginal people hunt wandering stock. Kempe endured trouble from the native police, who would bribe some Aboriginal men to kill their fellow tribesmen, sometimes offering them sex with the women as a reward. Kempe assisted Francis Gillen in bringing the notorious Constable Willshire to trial in Port Augusta.

Fried Schwartz left the mission in 1889 due to ill health, followed by Schulze in 1891. Kempe lost his wife and child during childbirth and was himself suffering from typhoid, so also left the mission in 1891. In this way the first term of administration of the mission ended.

The settlement was continued by lay workers until Carl Strehlow arrived in October 1894 (or 1895?) with his wife, Frieda Strehlow (née Kaysser). Frieda was born in 1875, and had met Strehlow when he was training to be a missionary in 1892. After marrying in Adelaide, the couple travelled by horse and buggy to Hermannsburg. Many of the locals could by this time speak German, and Strehlow continued documenting the local language, and was involved with local people in Bible translation and hymn writing. In 1896 additional construction took place of a school house, which was also used as a chapel and an eating house. Frieda taught the women about a healthy diet and how to reduce child mortality. Severe droughts during 1897-8 and again in 1903 meant poor food production and an influx of Aboriginal people.

=== 20th century ===
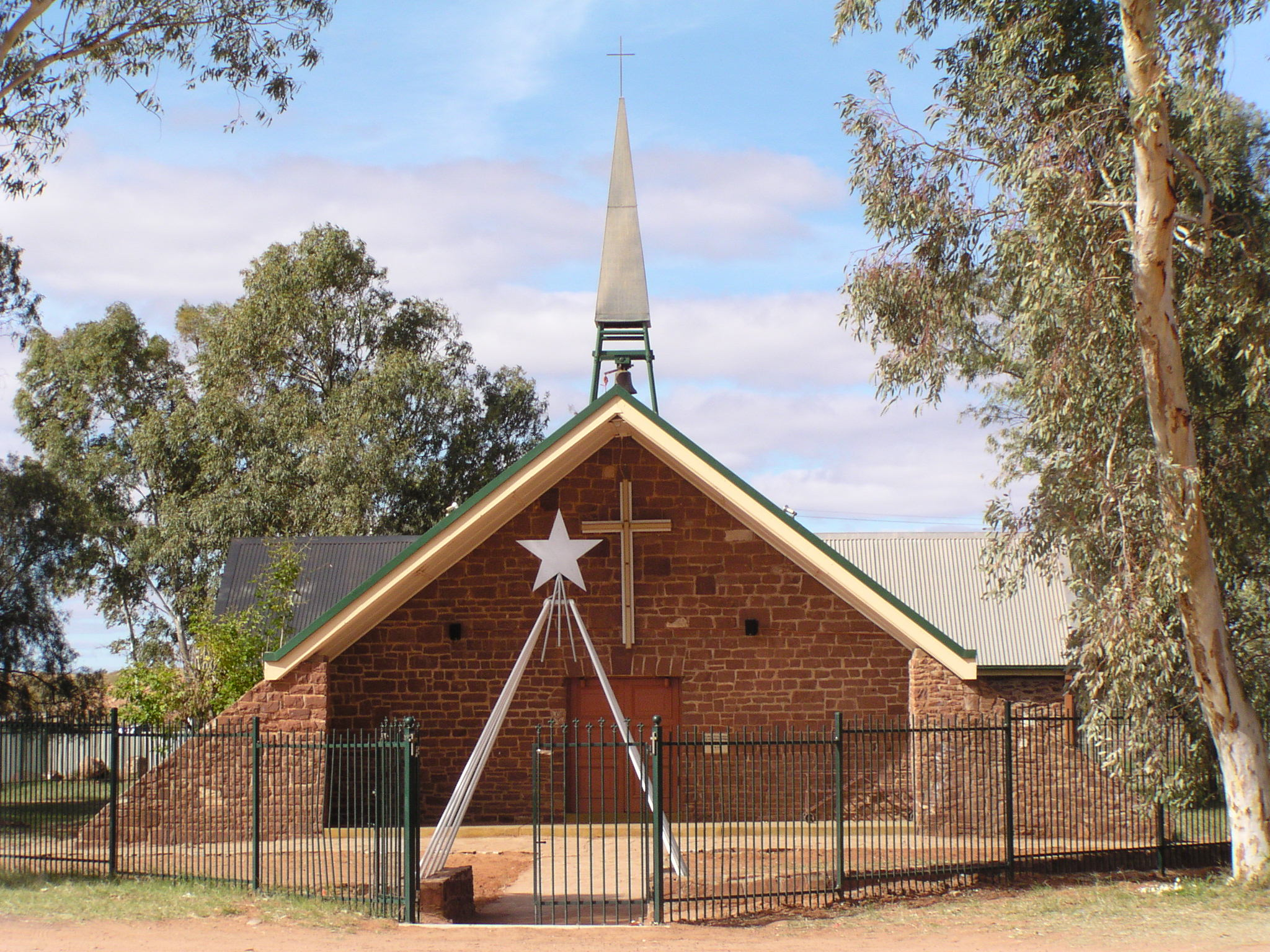
The new Bethlehem Lutheran church, built in 1964

In mid-1910, the Strehlows left on a break to Germany and placed their five eldest children with relatives and friends there, in order to secure a good education for them. While they were away, they were replaced by Leibler and then by teacher H. H. Heinrich. Carl, Frieda, and their son Theo (Ted Strehlow), returned in 1912, having received letters from Aranda elders imploring them to return.

Many English-speaking people in the area mistrusted the German missionaries, and did not have a high opinion of the Aboriginal people. From 1912 to 1922, Baldwin Spencer, then Special Commissioner and Chief Protector of Aborigines, attempted to shut down the mission. In his 1913 report, Spencer proposed taking all Aboriginal children away from their parents and setting up reserves where the children would be denied any contact with their parents, be prevented from speaking their languages and made incapable of living in the bush. He was particularly keen to make sure that "half-caste" children had no contact with camp life. Hermannsburg was to be taken away from the Lutherans and "serve as a reserve for the remnants of the southern central tribes where they can, under proper and competent control, be trained to habits of industry". However, when the Administrator of the Northern Territory, John A. Gilruth, came down from Darwin in 1913 to see whether these negative reports were true, he gave Strehlow his support.

The Strehlows finally left on 22 October 1922 when Strehlow contracted dropsy. He died the next day at Horseshoe Bend.

Hermann Adolph Heinrich had arrived at Hermannsburg in 1917. Trained as a teacher at the Immanuel College, a Lutheran college in South Australia, he worked as the mission schoolteacher. After the death of Carl Strehlow in 1922, Heinrich acted as substitute missionary. Hermannsburg remained without a resident pastor, with visiting pastors providing pastoral services when needed. During Heinrich's absence in late 1923 and early 1924, Pastor Johannes Riedel stayed at Hermannsburg for several months.

The role of Aboriginal lay preachers increased during this period. Among the most prominent was the blind Western Arrernte evangelist Moses Tjalkabota. He had been among the Aboriginal men who assisted Strehlow with his translation of the New Testament into Western Arrernte. During the pastoral vacancy, Tjalkabota continued to conduct services and provide baptismal instruction. He also helped to extend the mission's outreach by travelling to Aboriginal communities beyond Hermannsburg. This period marked an important development in Aboriginal-led evangelism at Hermannsburg.

Friedrich Wilhelm Albrecht arrived with his wife in April 1926. They stayed until 1962. Drought struck again in 1927 causing ill heath and scurvy. There was yet another influx of Aboriginal people and 85 per cent of Aboriginal children died during this time. A delivery of oranges was considered "a miracle".

Albrecht was integral to the development of the Kuprilya Springs Pipeline, which piped water from a permanent water hole 6 km (3.7 mi) to the mission. It was funded in part by Melbourne artist Violet Teague and her sister Una, and was completed on 1 October 1935. Albrecht also developed various other enterprises such as a large vegetable garden and orchard, beef cattle ranching and a tannery. They also supported the development of the school of watercolour landscape artists, which became one of the special heritages of the Hermannsburg area.

The first two Aboriginal pastors were ordained in 1964, Conrad Rabaraba and Cyril Motna. Doug Radke was pastor from 1965 to 1969.

The mission land was handed over to traditional ownership in 1982 under the Aboriginal Land Rights Act 1976.

The settlement and its satellite communities were funded as an outstation during the 1980s.

=== 21st century ===
By 2014, there were 24 Aboriginal pastors, and more than 40 trainees and female church leaders. The congregation included around 6,000 people, and sermons were being delivered in Luritja, Western Arrarnta, Pitjantjatjara, Anmatyerre, and Alyawarr, as well as English.

== Legacy of the missionaries ==
The Lutherans worked at keeping the local languages alive, and the Strehlows greatly increased the knowledge of Aranda culture. Much is preserved in the Strehlow Research Centre in Alice Springs, and author John Strehlow, son of Ted, has written a two-volume book about his grandparents, Carl and Frieda Strehlow.

According to musician Warren H Williams, who was born at Hermannsburg, "If the missionaries had not come to Hermannsburg, there would be no blackfellas in Central Australia" – this observation based on the attitude of the English-speaking administrators and other settlers in the region.

== Heritage listing ==
The Hermannsburg Historic Precinct was listed on the Northern Territory Heritage Register on 19 May 2001 and on the Australian National Heritage List in April 2006.

The mission buildings, located adjacent to the town of Ntaria, are empty. The heritage precinct is owned by the local Western Arrarnta people, represented by the Hermannsburg Historical Society, while the Finke River Mission (a term that now embraces all Lutheran missionary activities in the Northern Territory) act as managers.

== Facilities ==
The Finke River Mission operates the general store, by request of the community.

== Art ==
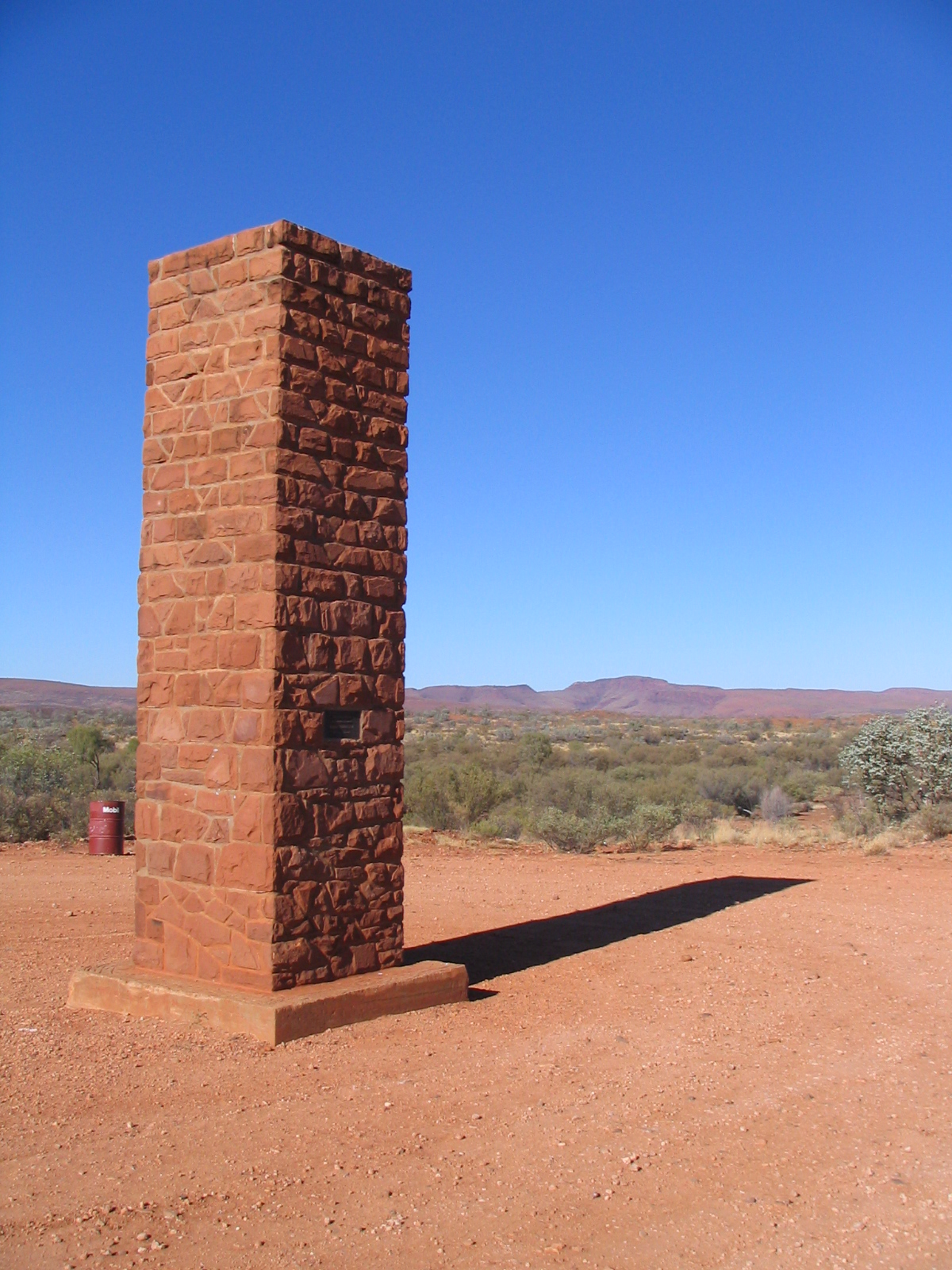
Albert Namatjira monument

Albert Namatjira (1902–1959), famous for his watercolour landscapes, founded a style later known as the Hermannsburg School of painting.

The Hermannsburg Potters are well known for their ceramic art, and many successful artists live in the town.

== Choir ==
In 1891 Pastors Kempe and Schwarze created a Western Arrernte language version of the Lutheran hymn book, comprising 53 hymns. The congregation learnt to sing them, and a choir was born. Singing was an important part of the church activities, and there were many versions of the choir over the years, eventually evolving into what is as of 2022 called the Ntaria Choir. The choir sings in Western Arrernte and Pitjantjatjara. Initially a mixed choir, it became women-only in the 1970s until the late 2010s, when men joined the choir again. It is today world-famous and has produced several albums. As of 2020 it included six women and two men.

== "Finke River Mission" ==
"Finke River Mission" was initially an alternative name for the Hermannsburg Mission, but this name was later often used to include the newer government settlements at Haasts Bluff, Areyonga and Papunya. In 2014, the Lutheran Church of Australia started using the term to apply retrospectively to all Lutheran missionary activity in Central Australia since the first mission was established at Hermannsburg in 1877, including establishments at Alice Springs, and the name continues to be used as of 2022.

Yirara College is a co-educational boarding school in Alice Springs run by Finke River Mission, catering for around 200 Aboriginal students. It also has a small campus in Kintore (Walungurru), catering for around 30 students.

As of 2015, there were 21 Aboriginal pastors and many other church workers employed by Finke River Mission, serving over 30 communities in five Aboriginal languages.

== Notable people ==
=== The Radkes ===
Reverend Doug Radke and his wife Olga Radke OAM, along with their four children, moved to the Finke River Mission in 1965. Both worked with the Aboriginal community until 1969. They both loved music, and worked with the choir, including taking the singers on a tour to the southern states in 1967, for which Olga was the piano accompanist and organist. After leaving Hermannsburg they moved on to work with other Lutheran congregations, until Doug's untimely death, when Olga moved to Alice Springs to work at the Strehlow Research Centre as a volunteer. In 2003, she became a member of the Prisoners' Aid and Rehabilitation Association of Alice Springs. She lobbied for a support group for people with mental illness, and has continued to work with churches and choirs. In the 2015 Queen's Birthday honours list, Olga was awarded the Medal of the Order of Australia for service to the community of Alice Springs. In 2021, she wrote and published a book about the 1967 tour, entitled Hermannsburg Choir on Tour - Remembering the 1967 Choir Tour. The book includes her original detailed "Choir Tour Diary".

=== Other people ===
- Yvette Holt, a poet from Brisbane, has lived in Hermannsburg since 2009 (as of 2021)
- Peter Latz (1941–), botanist, grew up there
- Vincent Namatjira (1983–), Painter & first Indigenous artist to win the Archibald Prize spent his early life and late teens there
- Shane Nicholson, after a visit to Hermannsburg with Warren H Williams, wrote a song called "Hermannsburg" in 2015
- Otto Pareroultja, first painter in the region to paint in a more impressionist style
- Ted Strehlow (1908–1978), son of Carl, noted anthropologist, initiated into Aranda customs
- Gus Williams, Aboriginal country music singer
- Warren H Williams, son of Gus, also a singer, and a traditional owner of Ntaria

== See also ==
- Strehlow Research Centre
