= Finke River =

River in the Northern Territory, Australia

Coordinates: 24°08′39.55″S 132°52′20.76″E

Finke
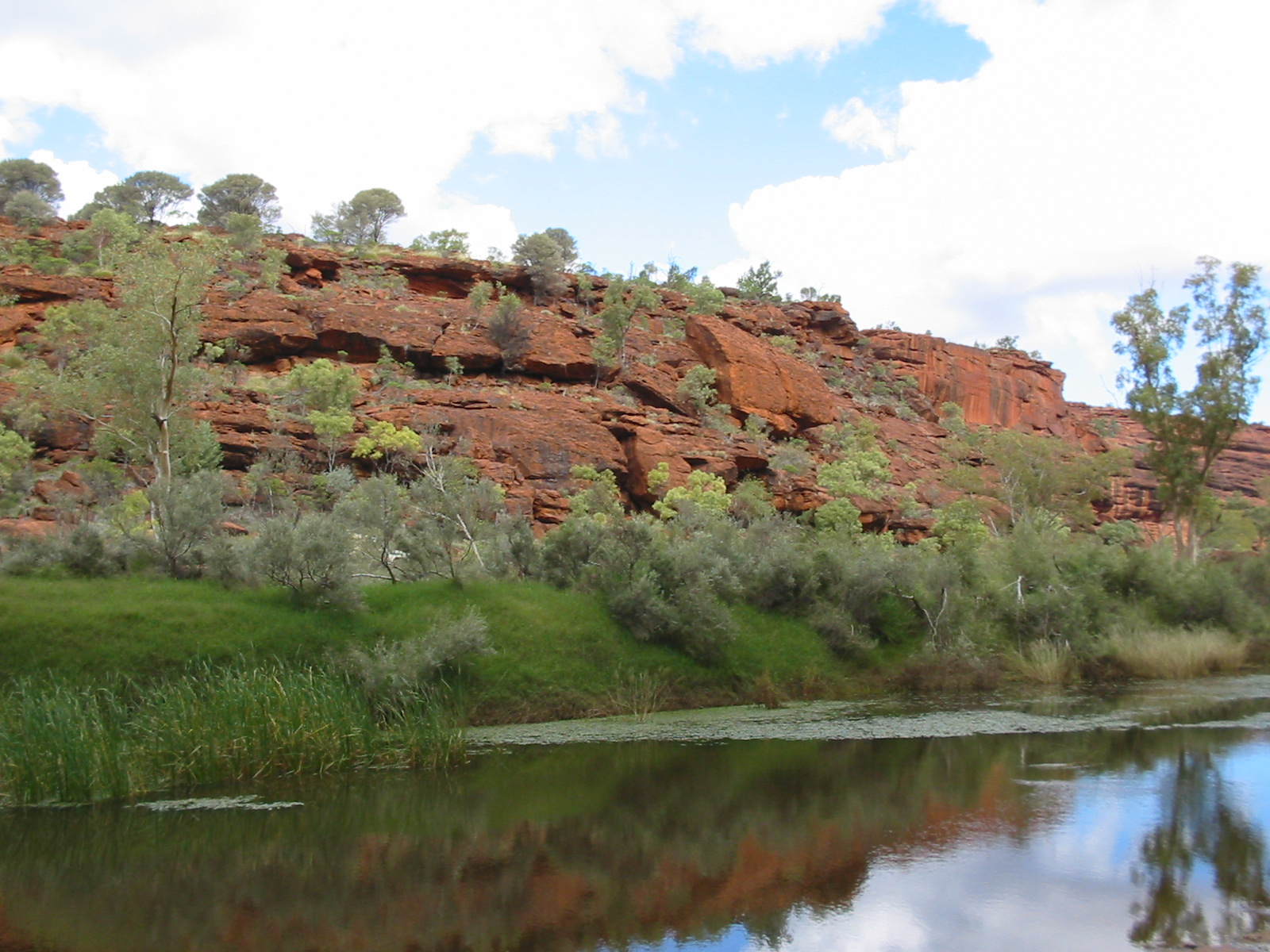
- The Finke River after rain, Northern Territory

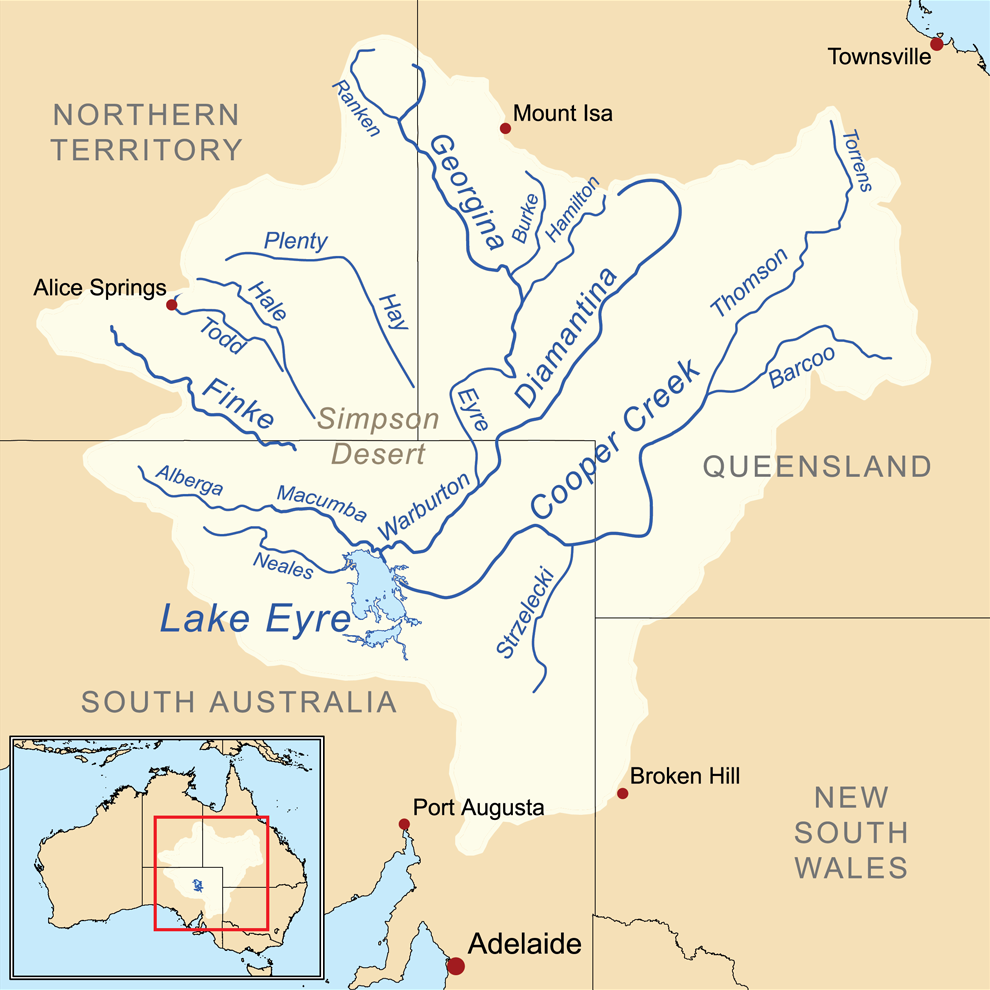
- Map of the Lake Eyre Basin showing the Finke River
- Etymology: William Finke
- Native name: Larapinta (Western Arrarnta) ("Salt River")

Location
- Country: Australia
- State: Northern Territory, South Australia

Physical characteristics
- Length: 750 km (470 mi)

Basin features
- River system: Lake Eyre Basin
- National parks: West MacDonnell; Finke Gorge

The Finke River (/ˈfinkə/ FINK-uh; German: [ˈfɪŋkə]; Western Arrarnta: Larapinta) is a river in central Australia, the bed of which courses through the Northern Territory and the state of South Australia. It is one of the four main rivers of the Lake Eyre Basin and is thought to be the oldest riverbed in the world. It flows for only a few days a year. When that happens, its water usually disappears into the sands of the Simpson Desert and rarely, if ever, reaches Lake Eyre.

== Geography ==
The source of the Finke River is in the Northern Territory's MacDonnell Ranges, which flows through central Australia. The name is first applied at the confluence of the Davenport and Ormiston Creeks, just north of Glen Helen Gorge. From here, the river meanders for about 600 km (370 mi) to the western edge of the Simpson Desert in northern South Australia. It flows through the West MacDonnell and Finke Gorge National Parks.

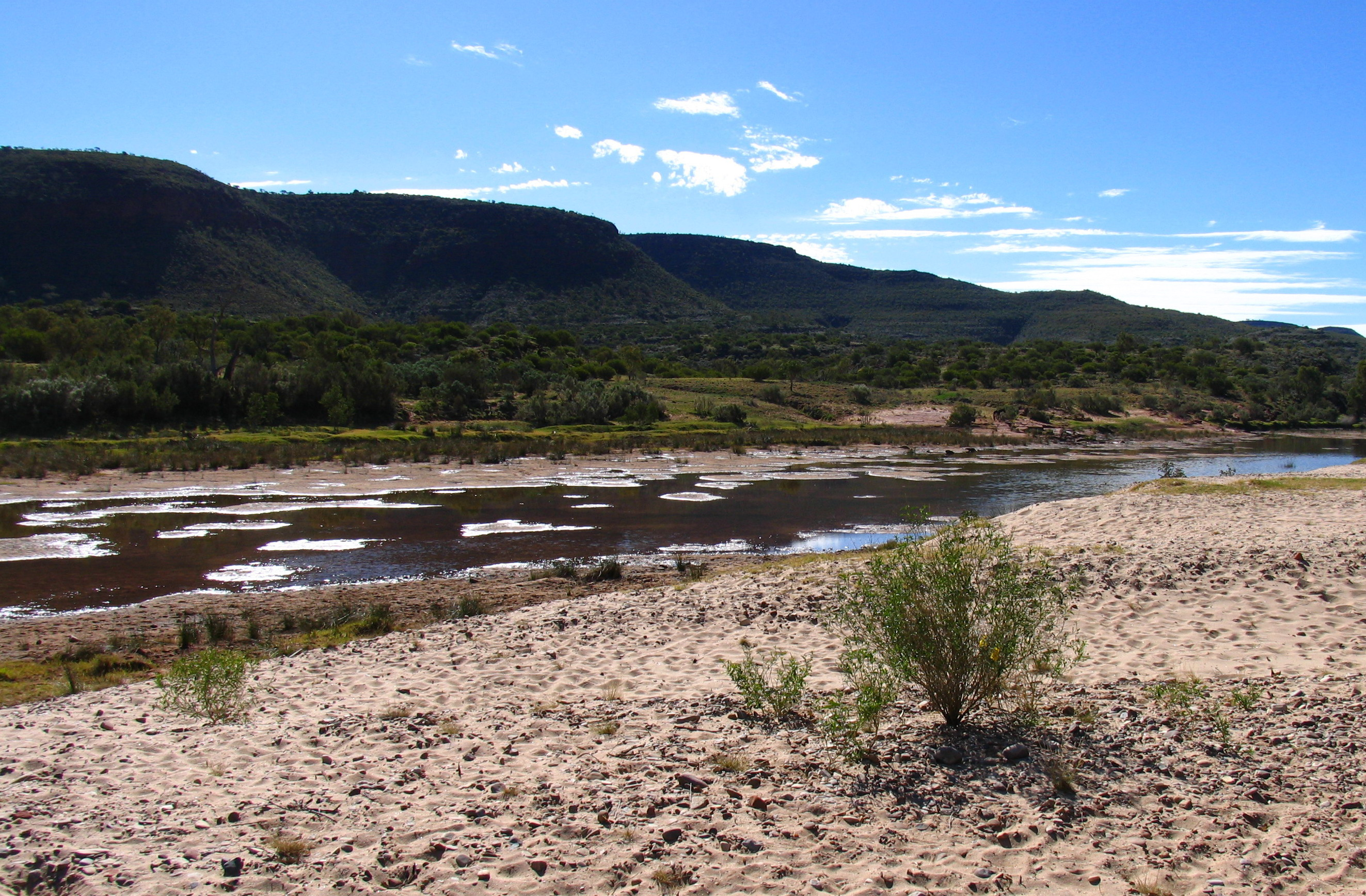
Finke River is normally a string of waterholes

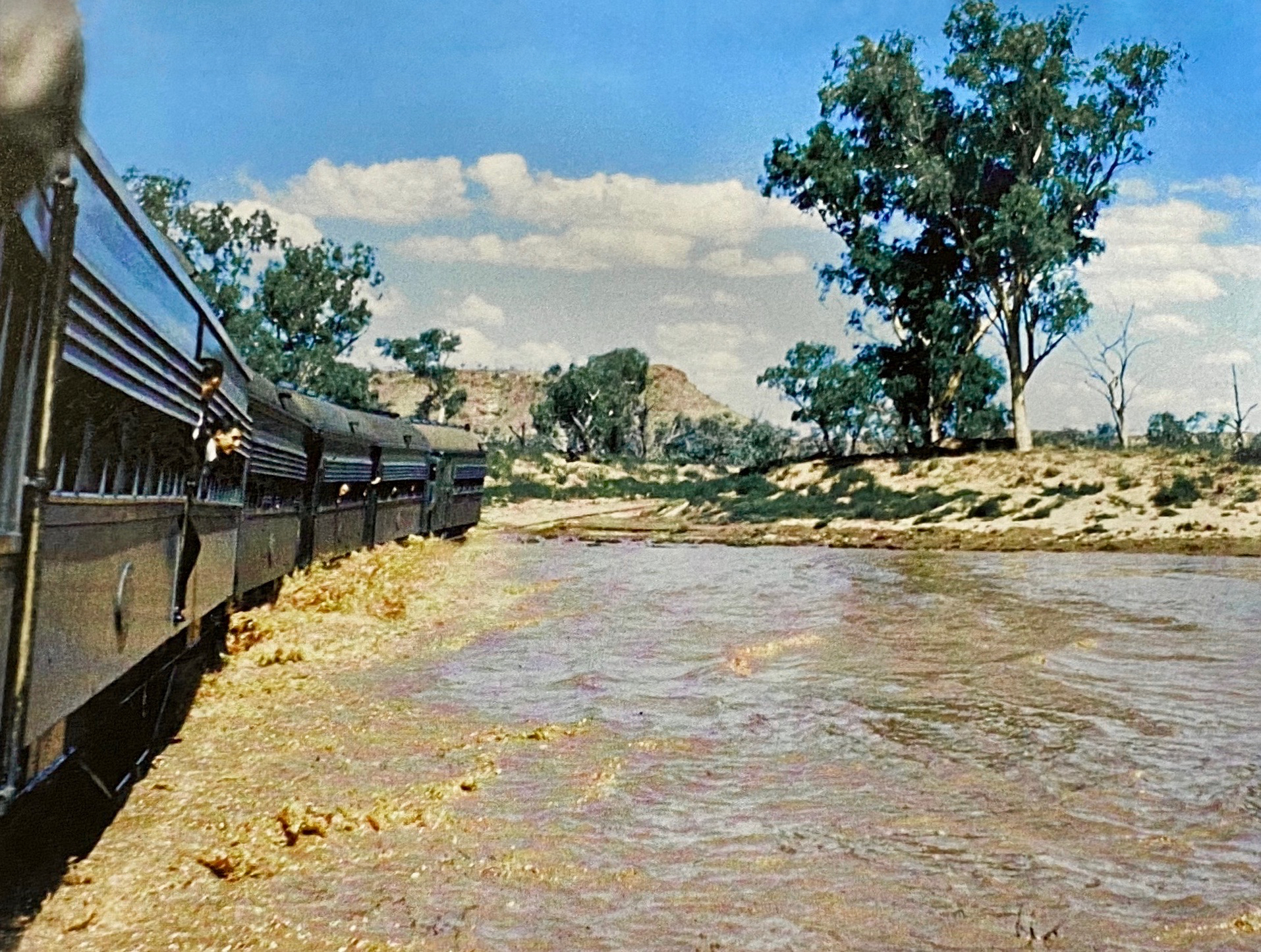
The Ghan slowly crossing the river after major flooding in February 1953

Usually the river is a string of waterholes, but it can become a raging torrent during rare flood events, fed by tropical rains upstream. In extreme instances, water from the Finke River flows into the Macumba River, which empties into Lake Eyre – a total distance from headwater streams of about 750 km (470 mi). Major tributaries include Ellery Creek, and the Palmer and Hugh Rivers.

== History ==
Wangkangurru is an Australian Aboriginal language spoken in Wangkangurru country. It is closely related to the Arabana language of South Australia. The Wangkangurru language region was traditionally in the South Australian-Queensland border region, taking in Birdsville and extending south towards Innamincka and Lake Eyre, including the local government areas of the Shire of Diamantina and the Outback Communities Authority of South Australia.

After several bridges on the now-closed Central Australia Railway were washed away by floods, rails were laid permanently on the bed of the river. In February 1953, after two days waiting at Finke township nearby, the river level was low enough for a steam-hauled train – The Ghan – to proceed slowly across.

== Names ==
The Finke River was named by John McDouall Stuart in 1860 after an Adelaide man, William Finke, who was one of the promoters of his expedition.

The Aboriginal name for the river in parts of the Northern Territory, usually taken as Larapinta, may have been incorrectly translated by its first transcriber, the explorer Ernest Giles. In August 1872, while camped at Charlotte Waters Telegraph Station, Giles was the first "outsider" to record the Arrernte name for the Finke River. He incorrectly deduced from his conversations with Southern Arrernte that the name was derived from the gigantic mythological snake (known as the Rainbow Serpent) which was believed to have created the river, and thought that larapinta meant snake in the local language. However in July 1876, Rev. Georg A. Heidenreich, the Superintendent of the Finke River Mission Station (Hermannsburg), appears to have been the first to have confirmed the Western Arrernte name of the river, which was actually "Lara Beinta", which means "Salt River". This translation is now widely accepted because the Finke contains certain waterholes that are constantly salty (one of which is named "Salt Hole" in English). The legend of its derivation from the serpent is nonetheless held by the local people.

The original spelling was a deliberate choice used for the main exit road west from Alice Springs, Larapinta Drive, as it leads to the Finke River at Hermannsburg; the name was also used for an Alice Springs suburb and the Larapinta Trail. (Larapinta, Queensland may have a different derivation.)

== Antiquity of the Finke River ==
The Finke River is frequently cited as the oldest river in the world. Its age has been deduced from observation and analysis of various factors in the geology of the area. In places such as the James Range, the Finke flows through deeply incised meanders. Because meanders only form on flat plains, the river must be an antecedent stream, and have formed before the ranges were pushed up; this happened in a mountain building event referred to as the Alice Springs Orogeny which peaked between 400 and 300 million years ago (Devonian to Carboniferous Periods, both within the Paleozoic Era).

It is not possible to say with absolute confidence that it is the very oldest river, but it is certainly one of the oldest rivers in the world. However, southern parts of its course must be much younger, because the areas where the Finke now flows near the southern edge of the Northern Territory, and further south, were under the sea during the Mesozoic Era, part of the Great Artesian Basin.

The antiquity of the Finke River is not unique, but applies equally to other large mountain-sourced river systems in central Australia, such as the Todd and Hale Rivers and many others, because most of the central Australian mountain belts formed at around the same time. There are other eroded mountain ranges of equal or greater age to the MacDonnell Ranges, both in Australia and on other continents, so present rivers in those areas may have evolved from ancestral streams of equal or greater antiquity than the Finke.

== TV series ==
The 2023 six-part documentary series Larapinta looks at the people, stories, and science of the Finke River. Created by Arrernte and Luritja woman Talia Liddle, the series features historians, scientists, and traditional owners, who share their stories and knowledge. Songlines and stories from The Dreaming add to academic data about the river and surrounds. Cinematography is by Torstein Dyrting. The series aired on NITV from 19 August 2023, as well as being available on SBS On Demand.

== See also ==
- Geology of Australia
- List of rivers of Australia § Northern Territory
- List of rivers of Australia § South Australia
- List of rivers by age
- Massacre of Running Waters
