= Mabel Mary Taylor =

Australian diarist (1874–1909)

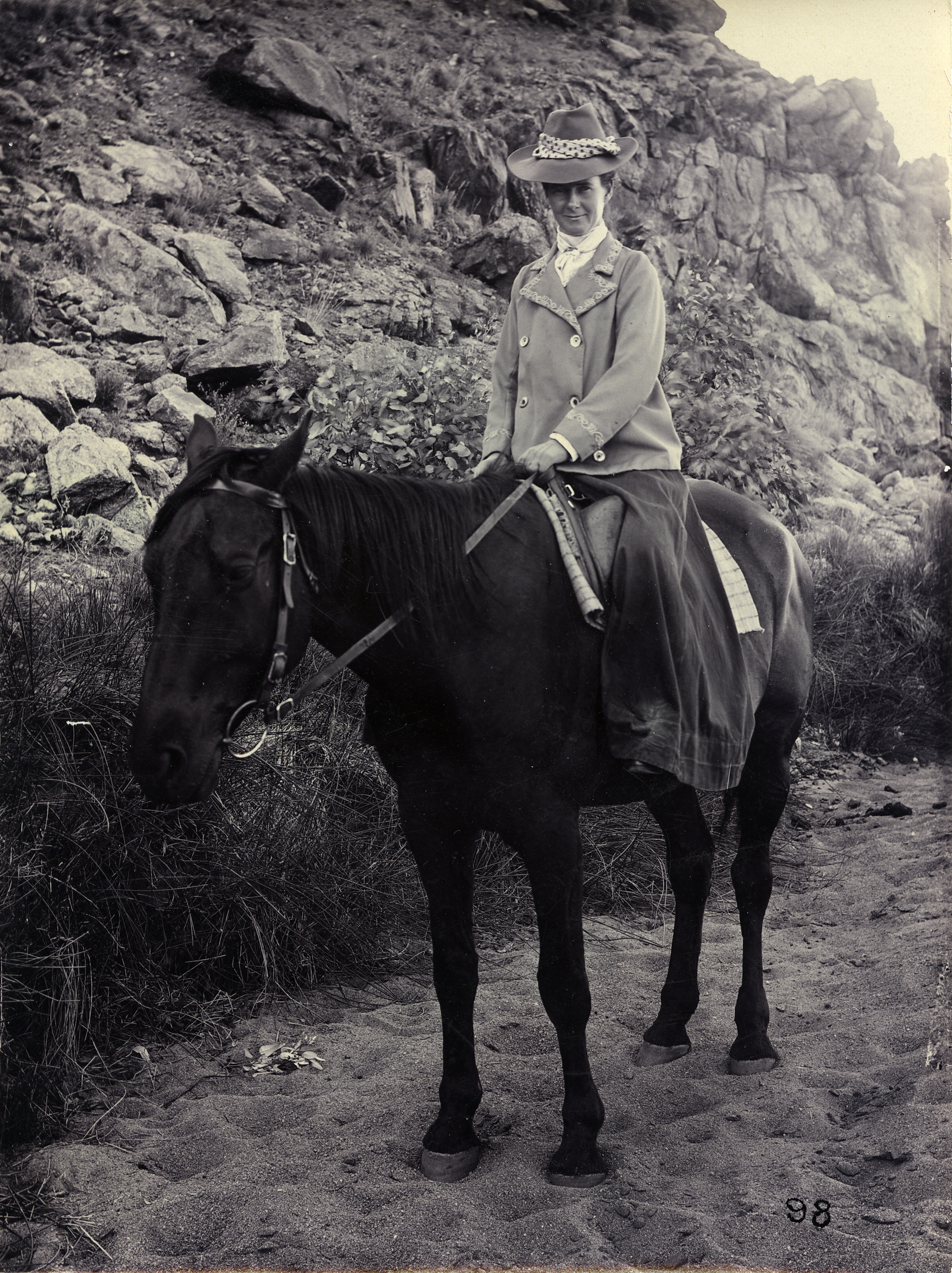
Mabel Mary Taylor in 1906

Mabel Mary Taylor (1874 – 26 January 1909) was an Australian diarist, who is best remembered for the 18 months that she spent in Alice Springs as the governess to the family of Thomas Bradshaw, the postmaster at the Alice Springs Telegraph Station between 1905 and 1907. During her period with the Bradshaw family she wrote a series of diaries and letters which were published, in a compiled form, in 2011. Her records furnish some lively accounts of people and daily life in the early years of Alice Springs, which was then called Stuart, when it was a tiny one-hotel settlement and give details about the children she taught (including Doris Blackwell; another strong character is Amelia Kunoth), the clothes she wore, remote places she visited, passing explorers and missionaries and the active social life of the settlement.

== Life in the Northern Territory ==
Taylor was 30-years old when she accepted the position of governess for the Bradshaw family when they lived at the Alice Springs Telegraph Station and she travelled there from Adelaide in May 1905. This journey was a long and difficult one with the train going only as far as Oodnadatta; followed by a buggy ride of more than 300 miles and having to make camp each night. In this position she replaced Mrs Louisa Cornock, a widow and experienced teacher, and she was much less of a disciplinarian than her predecessor with a much more casual style. Atlanta Bradshaw was, however, very happy with her and described her as a self-confident young woman from a reasonably privileged family.

On the trip to Alice Springs Taylor wrote a detailed diary of the trip including:

- Adelaide to Oodnadatta - 21 to 28 May 1905; where she described the country as "meadows and papachilna utterly dry and forsaken looking"
- Oodnadatta to Alice Springs - 29 May to 13 June 1905; where she goes into details about each day's camp and the people on the journey

Immediately on her arrival to Alice Springs Taylor shocked the local population by wearing a divided skirt on horseback instead of riding side saddle as was customary for women at the time. Doris Blackwell, in her book "Alice on the Line" goes into more detail about this saying:

Our new governess, Mabel Taylor, did an unheard of thing: she made a divided skirt to wear while riding a horse – a long, full, and discreet skirt, to be sure, covering her to the very ankles, but a divided skirt, nevertheless, which would enable her to ride astride instead of side-saddle. Never had a woman been seen in that country riding any other way than side-saddle. Quite a few of the locals were shocked, or made out that they were, by this daring innovation.

— Doris Blackwell, Alice on the Line

Blackwell's book "Alice on the Line" often adds detail to what Taylor described more economically and it is clear, from both women, that they regarded each other with deep respect. Taylor wrote of Blackwell that:

Doris is quite as tall as I am, although only fourteen, and is immensely proud of the fact. She is an exceptionally nice girl and we are great chums... she is the most natural and unspoiled girl.

— Mabel Taylor, Diary 17 September 1905

During her time in Alice Springs Taylor was very much involved in the social life of the town and photographs of that period, taken by Thomas Bradshaw, are held at the Library & Archives NT in the Thomas Bradshaw Collection, and the State Library of South Australia in the Vernon Smith Collection (this collection holds copies that Taylor purchased from Bradshaw and were later donated by her nephew). These pictures include many picnics, tennis parties and horse riding outings.

In 1907, after 18-months in Alice Springs (having already extended her time there by 6 months) Taylor decided to leave and it is not recorded why she made that decision, except that it was expiated by her desire to be at her brother Sid's marriage. It is also thought that, although she did not tell anyone, she knew that she had contracted Tuberculosis. It is unknown whether Taylor knew about her illness but when she left Alice Springs but it is clear that she had no plans but to spend time with her family and, by August 1907, was admitted to a specialist tuberculosis hospital (Kalyra in the Adelaide Hills). Rosemary Kennedy, who compiled Taylor's letters and diaries, believes that Taylor may have known of her illness before travelling to Alice Springs and hoped that the climate would cure her but; Kennedy also notes that there are many references to interactions with tuberculosis suffers in Alice Springs and the illness could have been contracted from them.

Taylor's last letter from Alice Springs (31 January 1907), to her mother, Taylor says that:

As I write this date I cannot help feeling an exultant thrill at the thought that, all being well, I shall be seeing you again in exactly two months from tonight. Only three more mails to go before we start. The forth train will take us too.

— Mabel Taylor, Letter, 31 January 1907

The Bradshaw family found it very hard to replace Taylor and Blackwell wrote that "there just weren't any takers for the position; either the Australian spirit of adventure was waning or governesses had discovered the value of money and wanted more than my father was able to pay". Blackwell was nearly 16 when Taylor left and she had to take over tutoring her younger siblings for their remaining year in Alice Springs.

== Later life ==
After her return to Adelaide she was later discharged from the hospital into the care of her mother and died, at home, on 26 January 1909; aged 34.
