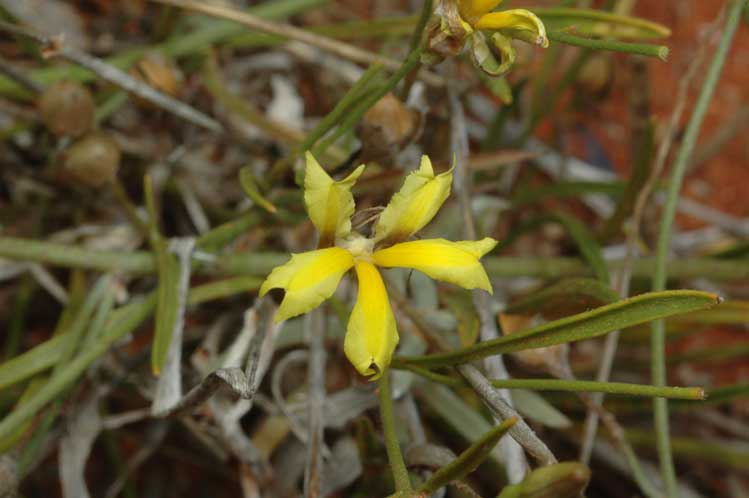

Scientific classification
- Kingdom: Plantae
- Clade: Tracheophytes
- Clade: Angiosperms
- Clade: Eudicots
- Clade: Asterids
- Order: Asterales
- Family: Goodeniaceae
- Genus: Goodenia
- Species: G. fascicularis

Binomial name
- Goodenia fascicularis F.Muell. & Tate

= Goodenia fascicularis =

Silky goodenia

Species of plant

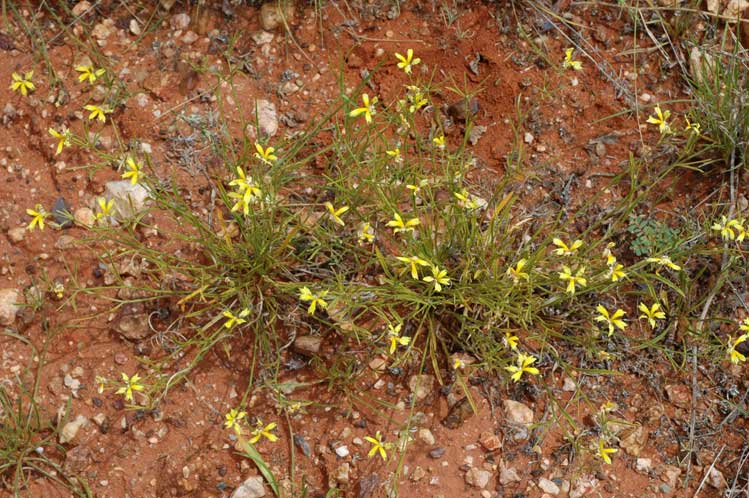
Habit near Broken Hill

Goodenia fascicularis, commonly known as silky goodenia, is a species of flowering plant in the family Goodeniaceae and is widely distributed in eastern continental Australia. It is an ascending perennial herb with linear to egg-shaped leaves and racemes of yellow flowers.

== Description ==
Goodenia fascicularis is an ascending perennial herb that typically grows to a height of 20 cm (7.9 in) and has hairy foliage. It has linear to egg-shaped leaves 20–140 mm (0.79–5.51 in) long, 4–25 mm (0.16–0.98 in) wide at the base of the plant and smaller leaves on the stem. The flowers are arranged in leafy racemes up to 100 mm (3.9 in) long on a peduncle 20–70 mm (0.79–2.76 in) long. The sepals are lance-shaped, 2.5–4 mm (0.098–0.157 in) long, the corolla yellow, 12–23 mm (0.47–0.91 in) long. The lower lobe of the corolla is 5–10 mm (0.20–0.39 in) long with wings 1.2–2.5 mm (0.047–0.098 in) wide. Flowering occurs in most months and the fruit is a more or less spherical capsule 5–8 mm (0.20–0.31 in) in diameter.

== Taxonomy and naming ==
Goodenia fascicularis was first formally described in 1890 by Ferdinand von Mueller and Ralph Tate in the Transactions, proceedings and report, Royal Society of South Australia from material collected in the Basedow Range (near Imanpa) in the Northern Territory, during the Tietkens expedition to Central Australia. The specific epithet (fascicularis) means "belonging to a small bundle".

== Distribution and habitat ==
This goodenia grows in a wide range of habitats including scrub, woodland and grassland west of Tamworth in New South Wales, in northern and north-western Victoria, and in Queensland, the Northern Territory and South Australia.
