= Curtin Springs =

Pastoral lease in Northern Territory, Australia

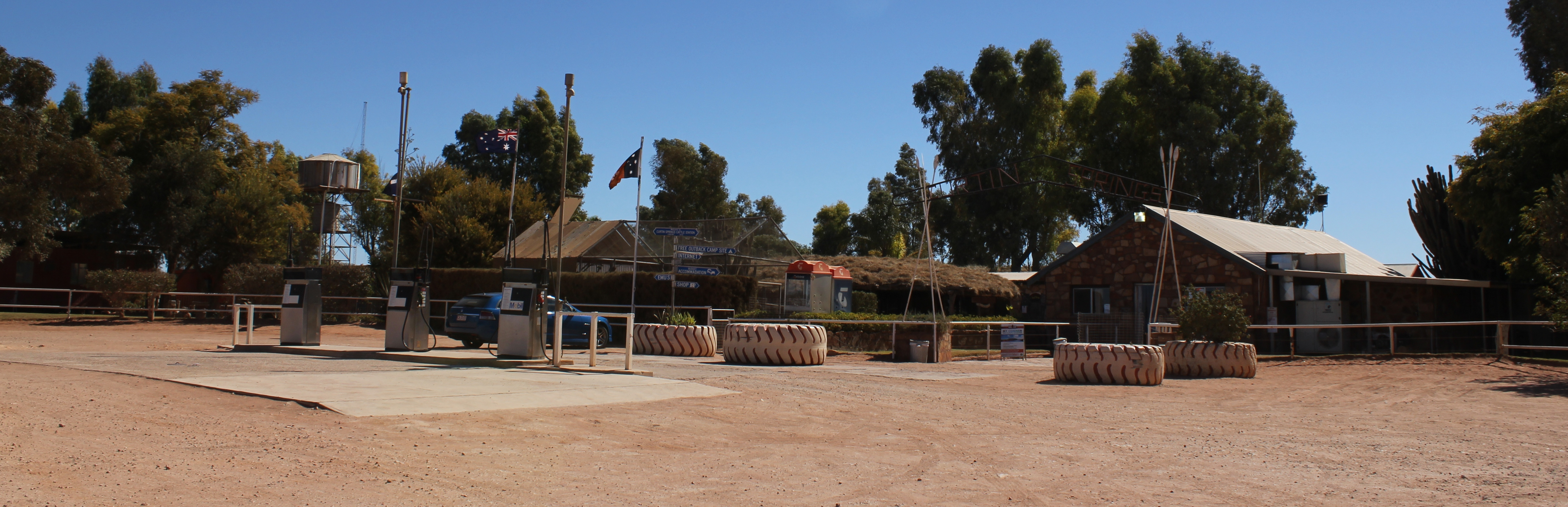
- Fuel pumps and pub at Curtin Springs Station

- Location within Northern Territory
- Former names: Mount Conner Station

General information
- Type: Cattle station
- Location: Petermann, Northern Territory, Australia, Lasseter Highway
- Coordinates: 25°18′S 131°45′E
- Owner: Severin family

Website
- http://www.curtinsprings.com

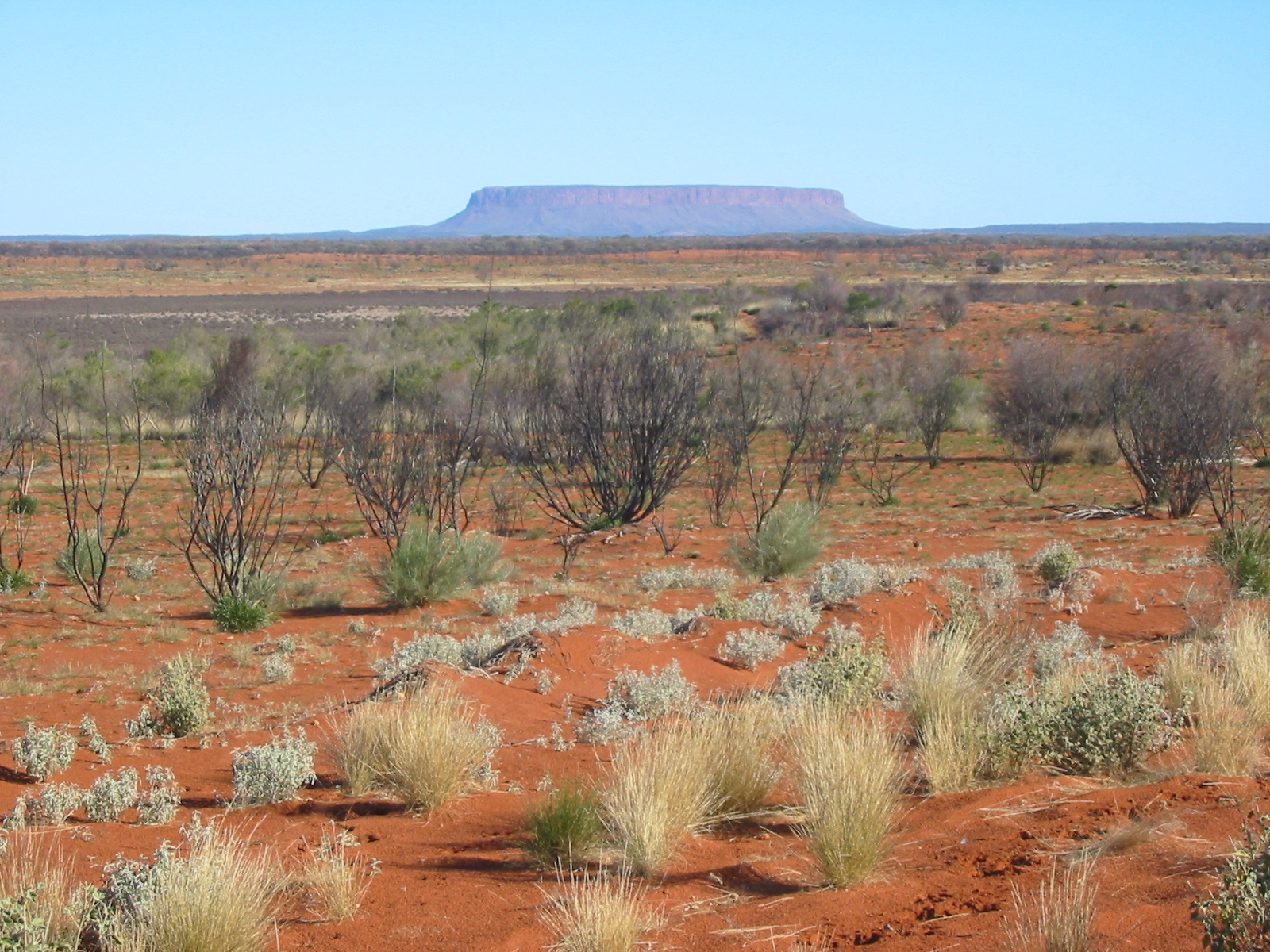
Landscape with Mt Conner

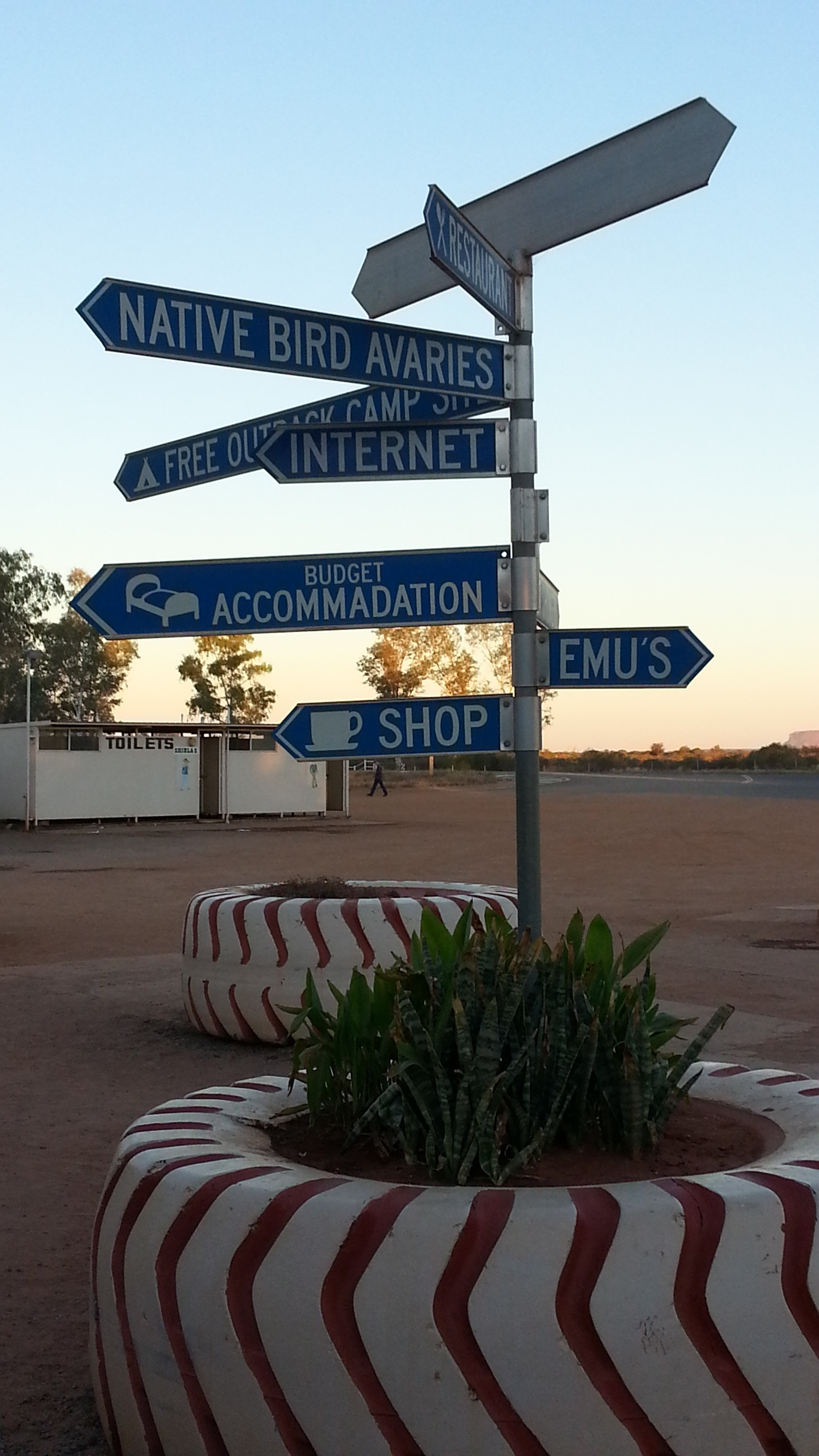
Signage at Curtin Springs station

Curtin Springs, formerly Mount Conner Station, is a pastoral lease operating as a cattle station in the Alice Springs region of the Northern Territory of Australia.

== Geography ==
Occupying an area of 416,400 hectares (1,028,947 acres), the working cattle station and roadhouse facility is located on the Lasseter Highway, 85 kilometres (53 mi) east of Yulara and the Uluru-Kata Tjuta National Park.

The property shares a boundary with pastoral leases Angas Downs to the north west, Lyndavale to the south east and Mulga Park to the south. It also abuts the Katiti Aboriginal Land Trust to the west.

=== Climate ===
Curtin Springs has a hot desert climate (Köppen: BWh, with very hot summers and mild winters. Precipitation is low and erratic year-round, and primarily occurs during the summer.

Climate data for Curtin Springs (25º19'S, 131º46'E, 490 m AMSL) (1965-2024 normals and extremes, rainfall 1953-2024)
Month	Jan	Feb	Mar	Apr	May	Jun	Jul	Aug	Sep	Oct	Nov	Dec	Year
Record high °C (°F)	46.5 (115.7)	46.0 (114.8)	45.7 (114.3)	40.0 (104.0)	34.0 (93.2)	31.7 (89.1)	32.0 (89.6)	37.0 (98.6)	39.0 (102.2)	43.0 (109.4)	45.1 (113.2)	46.9 (116.4)	46.9 (116.4)
Mean daily maximum °C (°F)	37.9 (100.2)	36.7 (98.1)	34.0 (93.2)	29.3 (84.7)	23.9 (75.0)	20.2 (68.4)	20.5 (68.9)	23.2 (73.8)	27.9 (82.2)	31.9 (89.4)	34.5 (94.1)	36.5 (97.7)	29.7 (85.5)
Mean daily minimum °C (°F)	22.4 (72.3)	21.7 (71.1)	18.7 (65.7)	13.6 (56.5)	8.7 (47.7)	5.0 (41.0)	3.8 (38.8)	5.7 (42.3)	10.2 (50.4)	14.5 (58.1)	18.1 (64.6)	20.7 (69.3)	13.6 (56.5)
Record low °C (°F)	8.7 (47.7)	10.3 (50.5)	7.2 (45.0)	2.6 (36.7)	−1.0 (30.2)	−4.0 (24.8)	−6.5 (20.3)	−3.5 (25.7)	−1.0 (30.2)	2.0 (35.6)	5.0 (41.0)	9.7 (49.5)	−6.5 (20.3)
Average precipitation mm (inches)	29.2 (1.15)	25.5 (1.00)	27.5 (1.08)	14.4 (0.57)	17.1 (0.67)	14.2 (0.56)	11.8 (0.46)	7.8 (0.31)	9.8 (0.39)	18.1 (0.71)	23.8 (0.94)	31.0 (1.22)	231.2 (9.10)
Average precipitation days (≥ 1.0 mm)	2.5	2.3	1.9	1.6	2.0	1.7	1.5	1.3	1.5	2.3	3.0	3.1	24.7
Average afternoon relative humidity (%)	20	24	24	26	34	36	33	25	20	18	20	23	25
Average dew point °C (°F)	8.4 (47.1)	9.1 (48.4)	6.9 (44.4)	5.7 (42.3)	5.0 (41.0)	3.0 (37.4)	1.5 (34.7)	−0.2 (31.6)	0.6 (33.1)	1.8 (35.2)	5.0 (41.0)	7.7 (45.9)	4.5 (40.2)
Source: Bureau of Meteorology

== History ==
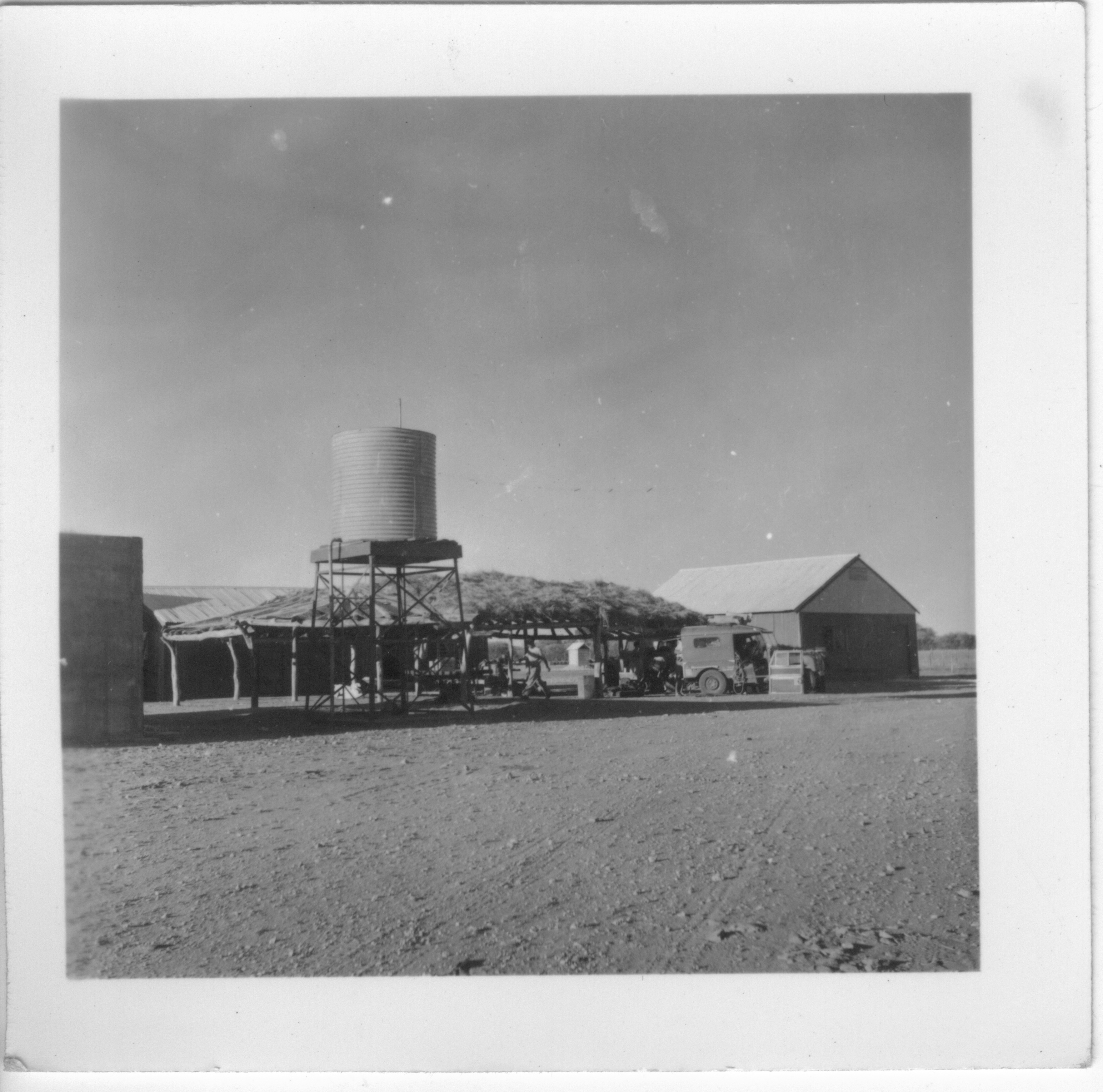
Curtin Springs Station in the 1960s

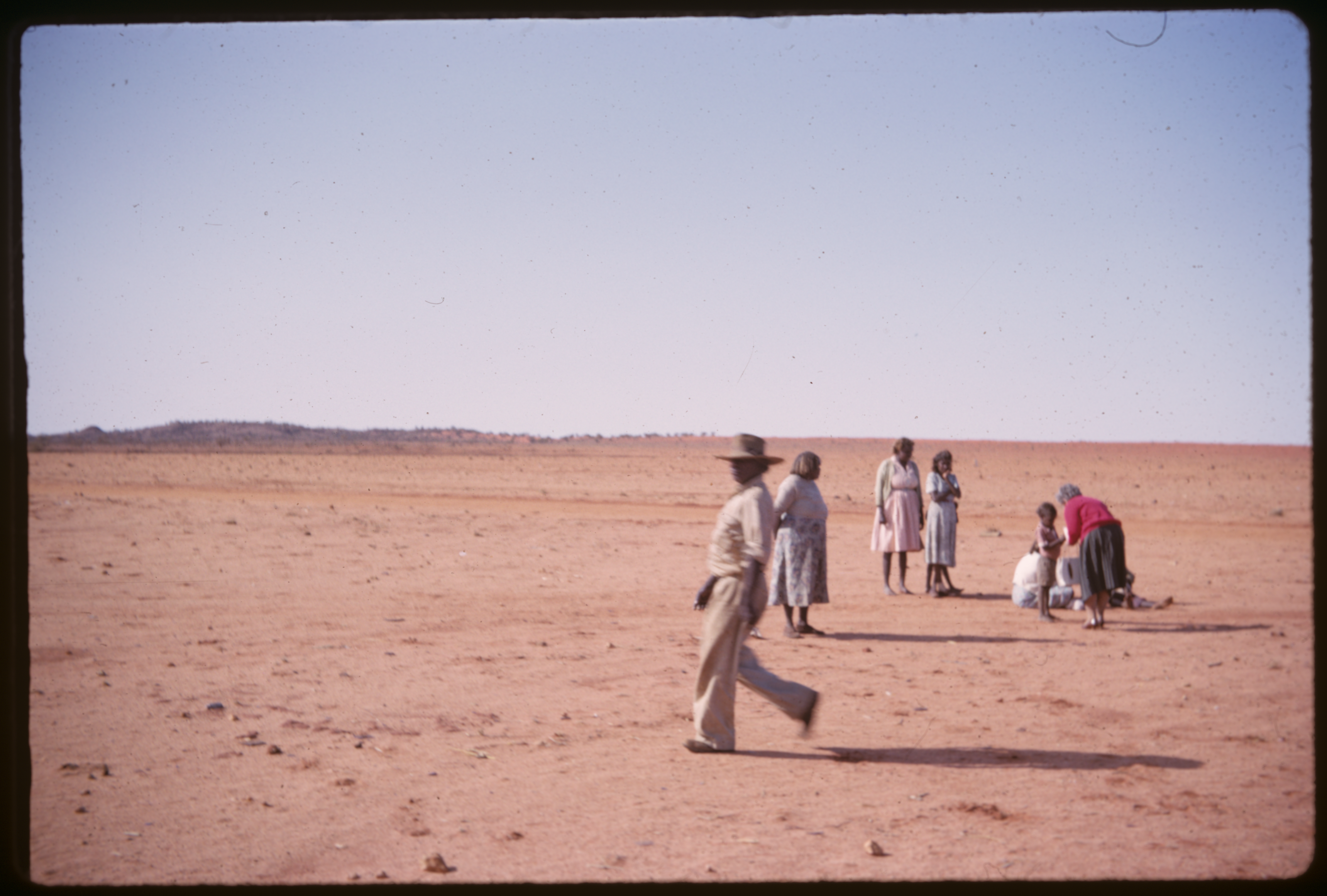
Aboriginal people at Curtin Springs in 1962 during a period of drought

=== 20th century ===
The station was first known as Mount Conner Station (after Mount Conner) in the 1930s, when it was first taken up by Paddy DeConlay as a sheep station.

Abraham Andrews leased Mt Conner Station in 1940, and named it Curtin Springs Station after John Curtin.

In 1956 the Peter and Dawn Severin took over the pastoral lease, arriving with a toddler son and 1500 head of cattle. The station was then around 500 mi^{2} (1,300 km^{2}).

Peter Severin had previously worked as the head stockman on another cattle station and was gifted 1,400 head of cattle when he took over Curtin Springs for the value of the debts.

Severin, his wife and young son had a lonely existence with only seven visitors in the first year. Life was difficult, with the family residing under a bough shed for the first three years.

By 1957, Len Tuit had begun operating return trips from Alice Springs to Uluru (then Ayers Rock), and was using Curtin Springs as a wayside to store fuel and water required for the return trip. This was the beginning of tourism in central Australia. Soon the Severins installed fuel tanks to service the bus tours that had commenced from Alice Springs to Uluru and provided food and drink to tourists on board.

Later Severin acquired a liquor licence and started a pub which later became part of the restaurant. The Curtin Springs liquor licence was opposed by many local Aboriginal elders and in particular the Ngaanyatjarra, Pitjantjatjara and Yankunytjatjara Women's Council, because it is considered by them to have contributed to alcohol-related violence and other social problems in nearby Aboriginal communities such as Mutitjulu, Imanpa, and Pukatja (Ernabella). In 1988, a number of elders took an action in nuisance against Severin in the Supreme Court of the Northern Territory, but were unsuccessful. The liquor license held by Curtin Springs is now subject to special restrictions prohibiting the supply of alcohol to any Aboriginal people from the surrounding communities and anyone suspected of travelling to local communities.

=== 21st century ===
By 2009, Murray Grey cattle were increasingly being used to improve the herd's temperament and quality.

==== 2011–2022 bushfires ====
In 2011 the area was plagued by the largest bushfires that had been seen there since the 1970s, some 200,000 acres (80,937 ha) of Marqua Station was burnt out. More bushfires, started from lightning strikes ignited bushfires at the station in September 2012, and the Lasseter Highway had to be closed in the area due to the resulting smoke hazard. More fires started from dry storms in October 2012 and were left to burn in areas that were inaccessible and where high winds made containment too difficult. The station lost over 250,000 acres (101,171 ha) of bush, nearly one quarter of its pasture land, as a result of the fires.

==== Native title ====
In April 2023, a Federal Court ruling determined in favour of the native title application lodged by Anangu seven years earlier for around 10,000 km^{2} (3,900 sq mi) of pastoral lease land that includes Erldunda, Lyndavale, and Curtin Springs stations. This was the first recognition of commercial rights in Central Australia. The ruling, which was handed down at a gathering in the remote community of Imanpa, granted traditional owners the right to hunt and perform ceremonies on the land, and also to be consulted over its use.

== Description ==
The Severin family run conservative cattle numbers so they can best manage disasters such as fires and drought. Water for the station and livestock is supplied by pumping it from underground with diesel or solar pumps and windmills. Cattle watering points are located in yards so that they may be passively mustered through the use of water trapping.

Over the years they diversified the business and started offering accommodation and other services to tourists, including tours and an art gallery. In March 2018, an artist-in-residence program began.

The station has a collection of birds in multiple aviaries around the homestead. All birds have been rescued after an injury or have been bred from captive animals so they are unable to be released into the wild.

Local tours include parts of the Amadeus Salt Lake Chain and Mount Conner, which is located on the private property of Curtin Springs Station.

== See also ==
- List of ranches and stations
- List of the largest stations in Australia
