= Doris Blackwell =

Australian writer (1891–1983)

Winifred Doris Blackwell (1 May 1891 – 14 January 1983) was an Australian memoirist. She was the co-writer of Alice on the Line.

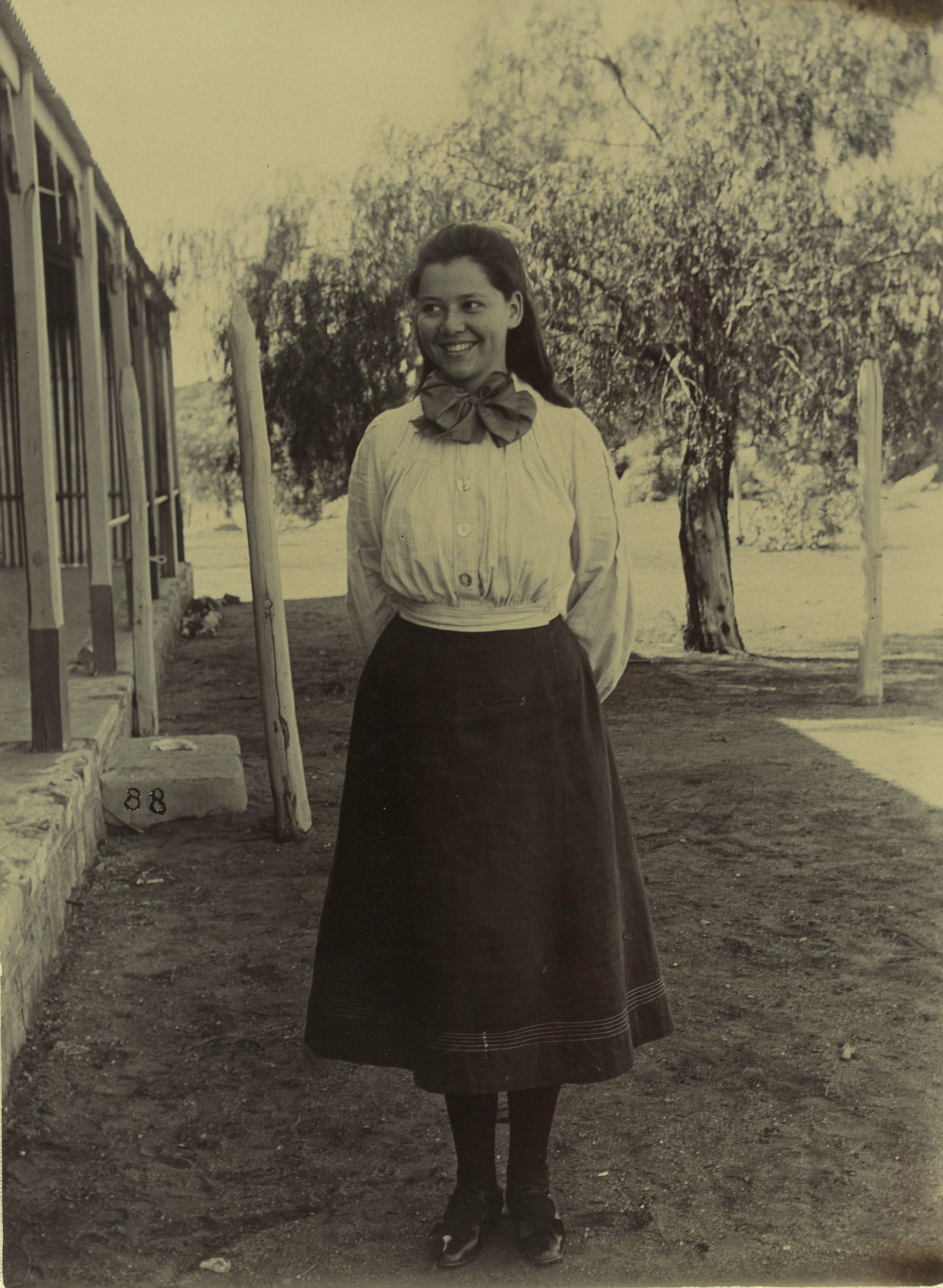
Doris Bradshaw, later known as Doris Blackwell in 1906

== Life in the Northern Territory ==
Doris Blackwell was the eldest daughter of Thomas Bradshaw and Atalanta "Attie" Bradshaw. Thomas Bradshaw served as postmaster and officer-in-charge of the Alice Springs Telegraph Station from 1899 to 1908.

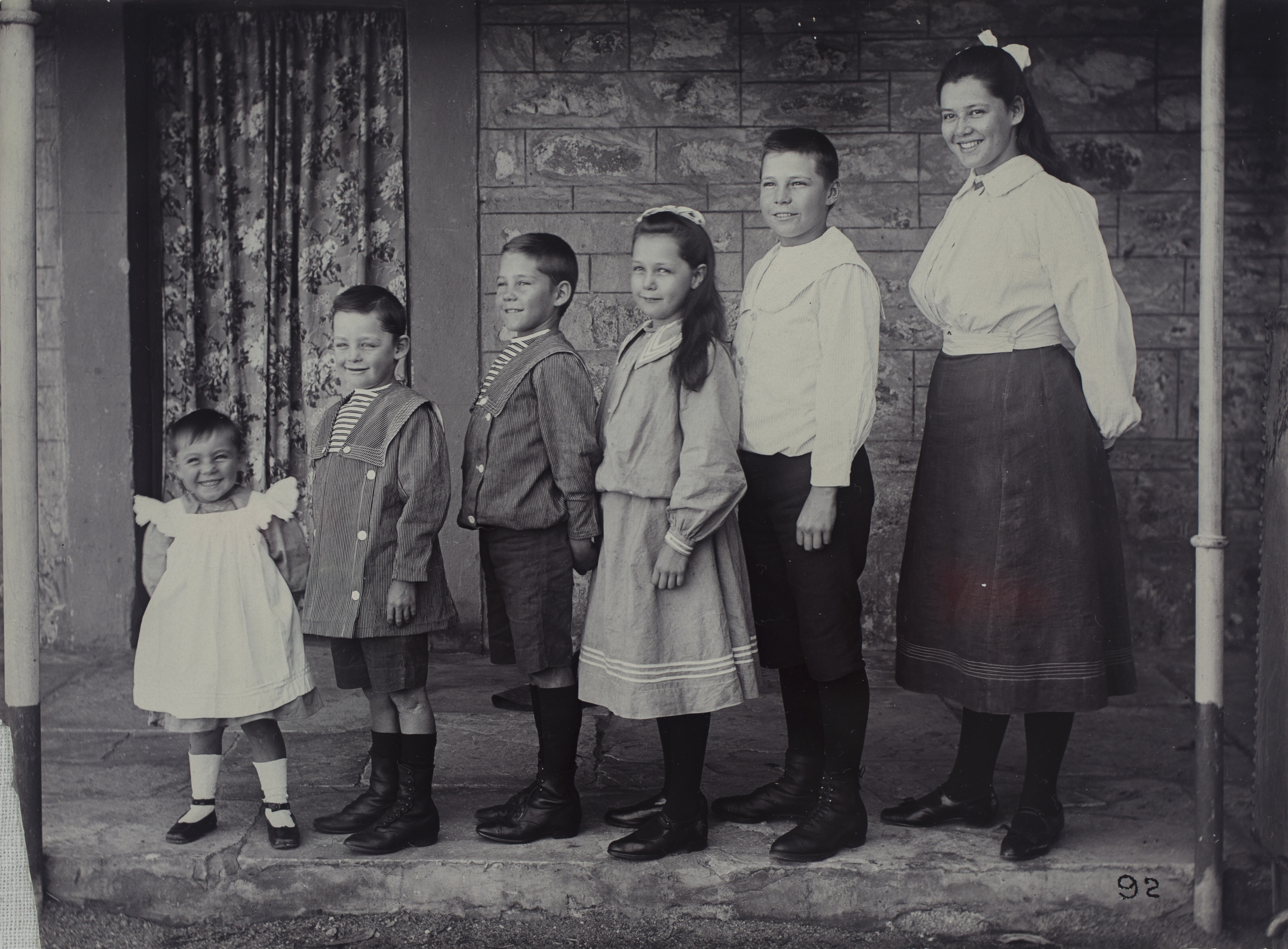
The Bradshaw Children at the Alice Springs Telegraph Station in 1906, Doris is on the far right.

Blackwell was born in 1891 in Adelaide, South Australia. At the age of 8, Blackwell and her family moved to Stuart (now Alice Springs) where her father worked at the Alice Springs Telegraph Station. The journey was long and difficult, consisting of a train ride to Oodnadatta followed by a 300-mile buggy ride, making camp along the way.

Blackwell remembered this journey as the "greatest adventure of her young life", although the novelty soon wore off. She said:

In all that vast land there was not one fence, or any track other than the one we used. But we knew that civilisation was ahead of us, for we followed the slender iron poles supporting the two wires of the Overland Telegraph line - the reason for our journey. The line stretched ahead interminably, so far that we could not distinguish the poles from one another where they ran into the horizon.

Upon their arrival, Blackwell soon found herself enjoying life in Alice Springs, saying that "Alice's tranquil charm converted all of us to her side". She would ride out daily on her horse to explore her surroundings. Because there was no established school in the area, her mother employed a governess and set up a schoolroom next door to the staff dining room which doubled as a courtroom, her father acting as the local magistrate.

The family employed several governesses throughout their time in Alice Springs, notably Mabel Mary Taylor. The family also employed a number of Aboriginal Australians within their household, with Blackwell recalling:

The native staff included a rather elastic number of houseboys, shepherds, cows and sheep, hewers of wood and carriers of water, scullery maids for the staff kitchen, two housemaids and a nurse girl in our home.

One significant figure in this time was Amelia Kunoth, the grandmother of Rosalie Kunoth-Monks, who worked as a companion and nurse for the children. She was left heartbroken when the family left in 1908. She requested to come with them; but the Bradshaw's denied her request, believing that it would be a mistake to take her away from her people and her land. Kunoth and Blackwell would continue to write to each other for much of their lives.

== Later life ==
Despite leaving Alice Springs at the age of 18, it is said that Blackwell never lost the "spell of the Inland". In 1922 she married Alex Blackwell, a World War I veteran who had served as a stretcher-bearer in Europe alongside her brother, Mort.

In the 1960s Blackwell worked with journalist Douglas Lockwood to write Alice on the Line, about her family's life on the old telegraph line, which was first published in 1965.

She died on 14 January 1983 in Adelaide, and is buried in Brighton (Saint Jude) cemetery.
