= Erldunda =

Pastoral lease in the Northern Territory, Australia

Coordinates: 25°13′20.5″S 133°11′41″E

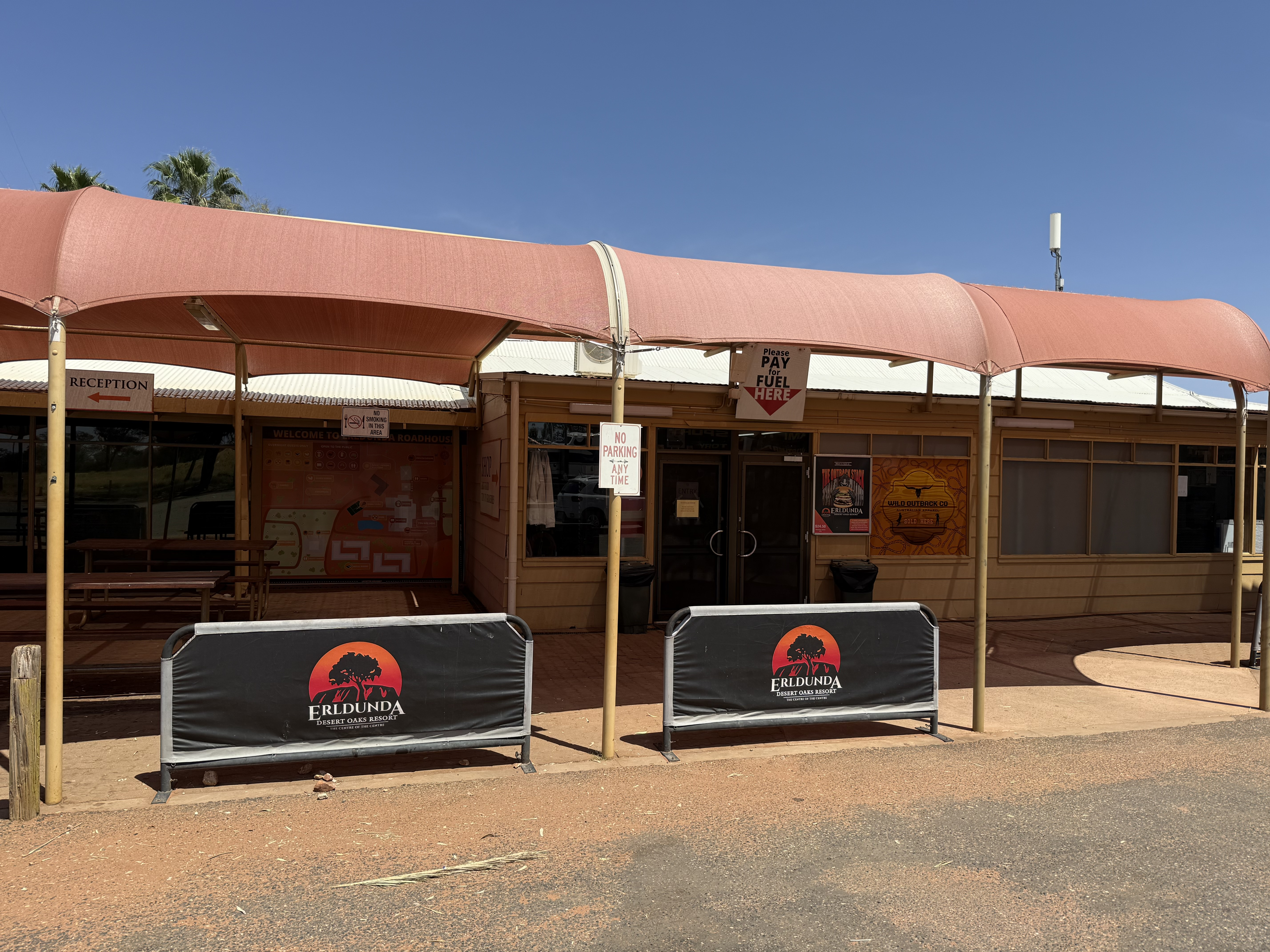
Erldunda Roadhouse, October 2025

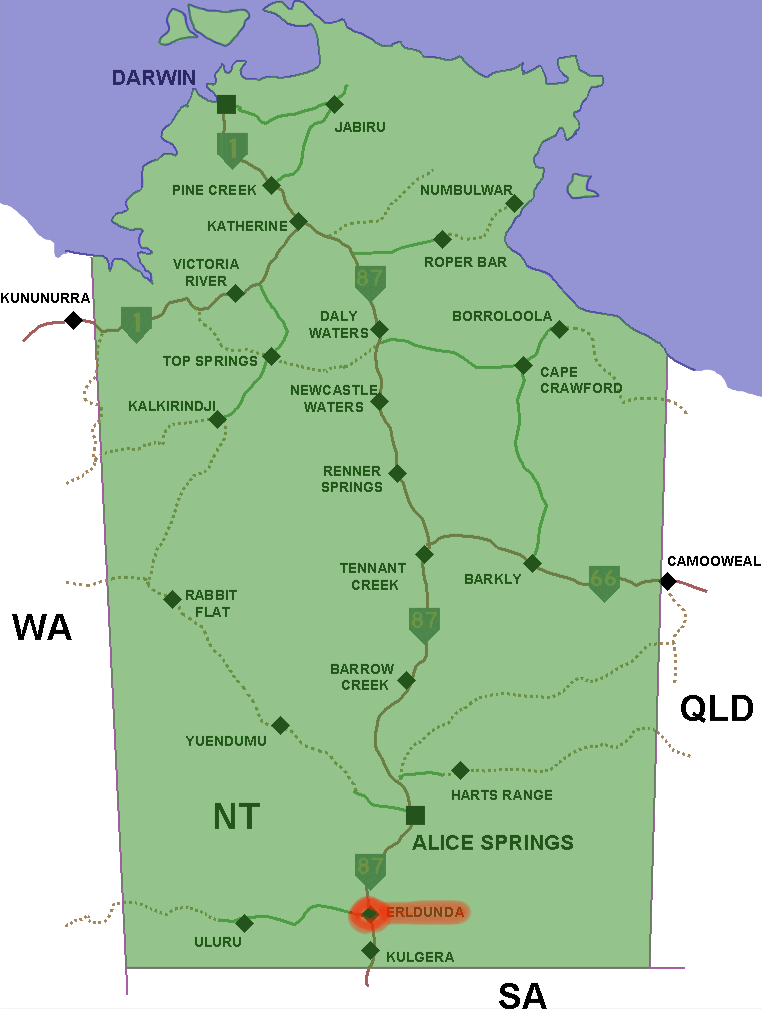
Location of Erldunda in Northern Territory (red)

Erldunda is a pastoral lease that operates as a cattle station 200 km (120 mi) south of Alice Springs in the Northern Territory of Australia.

== History ==
The property was established in the 1870s by Richard Warburton who stocked it in 1884, and the property remained with the Warburton family until the 1920s, when it was bought by the Stanes family.

== Location and description ==
Erldunda occupiea an area of 1,200 square miles (3,108 km^{2}) that carried a herd of 6,500 head of Santa Gertrudis cattle in 2010.

The station shares boundaries with other pastoral leases, such as Lyndavale to the west, Mount Ebenezer and Palmer Valley to the north, Idracowra to the east, and Umbeara and Victory Downs to the south. The ephemeral watercourses Karinga Creek and Kalamurta Creek both flow through the property. Lyndavale and Mount Ebenezer were as of 2019 owned by the Stanes family.

== Native title ruling ==
In April 2023, a Federal Court ruling determined in favour of the native title application lodged by Anangu seven years earlier for around 10,000 km^{2} (3,900 sq mi) of pastoral lease land that includes Erldunda, Lyndavale, and Curtin Springs stations. This was the first recognition of commercial rights in Central Australia. The ruling, which was handed down by Justice Mordy Bromberg at a gathering in the remote community of Imanpa, granted traditional owners the right to hunt and perform ceremonies on the land, and also to be consulted over its use. However neither the native title holders nor the pastoralists have rights over mineral exploration, and licences for potash mining are held over the lakes. Ross Stanes welcomed the determination, saying that his family had "had a long, long relationship with [Anangu], and that both pastoralists and native title holders respected each others' rights.
