= Pearl Powell =

Australian writer (1909–2004)

- Born: 14 December 1909
- Died: May 24, 2004 (aged 94)
- Occupation: Memoirist
- Notable work: By Packhorse and Buggy (1996)

Pearl Ruth Powell (14 December 1909 – 24 May 2004), née Price, formerly Bird, was an Australian memoirist. She was the co-writer of By Packhorse and Buggy (1996) alongside her daughter Eileen McRae. This memoir follows her life growing up at the Alice Springs Telegraph Station, the daughter of postmaster Fred Price and, following his early death, her life on various cattle stations throughout Central Australia.

== Life in the Northern Territory ==
Powell's father Fred Price became the postmaster at Alice Springs Telegraph Station in July 1916, taking over from John McKay and, in 1917, was followed by his wife, Isabelle Violet (Ivy) Price, and most of their young children, including Pearl; their daughter Hilda remained in Adelaide, where she was working as a milliner. This was not the family's first remote posting. When they arrived, Central Australia was in the middle of a protracted drought and mid-World War I leading to a very challenging time in the telegraph station's history.

Fred Price did not allow her to attend the local school, being reluctant to allow the children to walk the 4 km from their home to town where Ida Standley taught the "European" children in the mornings. Instead they were supervised in their lessons by a young telegraph officer Len McClean, who received the lessons from Standley.

Powell spent 8 years living at the telegraph station, living through many struggles, including the death of her older sister Hilda of Spanish flu in 1919. In 1923 her father decided that he needed a break from the stressful work and the family travelled to Adelaide for an extended break before taking up station leases in Central Australia. Sadly her father's health went rapidly down hill and he died, after an extended illness on 12 August 1924; he was 57.

Surprising many, Ivy returned to Central Australia with her four children (ranging between 10 and 17 years) and took up the lease of Harper Springs Station, northeast of Alice Springs, where they ran sheep. Powell says that she did not know how her mother did it, being from a "well-to-do family in England". On their return from Adelaide, ready to establish the station, they brought with them 200 merino-cross sheep and three camels and travelled with them, on horse and buggy, from the Oodnadatta railhead. They were assisted only by an Aboriginal man named George and the journey took 12 weeks; along the way, they picked up goats from the telegraph station.

Arriving at Harper Springs, they built their first home, a simple bough shed, and attempted to turn the property into a sheep station. During this time the family's collection of photographs (now known as the Powell-Price Collection) was damaged by termites. This collection shows the children, including Powell, riding cows and feeding goats, the breaking of the drought in 1919 and the early years of the telegraph station, including many people associated with it. This attempt was short-lived with troubles finding enough water, with the only well being a "whip well" or soakage (known to both contain and attract scorpions), as well as issues with termites and limestone soil which embedded dust in the wool of their sheep.

For these reasons, they moved on to their other lease at Woola Downs, south-east of Ti-Tree, in the 1920s, where there was already an established well. Life at Woola Downs was still difficult but the family, and their now 600 sheep (which grew to over 1000), made it work. Numerous times, Powell's mother Ivy tried to grow a garden but "whenever she had any success with the seed coming up they were quickly burnt off by the mineral salts in the water" and recalls that, as the water dried up, "it left a crust of salt around the edge of the garden, making all her efforts rather pointless". Other memories recorded of this time include Aboriginal workers on the station, travelling Afghan cameleers, butchering meat and the general goings-on of Central Australian station life.

Jim Bird, the newly arrived owner of Bushy Park Station, visited the family in 1926, and began pursuing Powell. In her memoir, she describes him as "just another man, much older than I was then at just 17 years of age", and she went on to say that she did not have any feelings for him. Despite this, she agreed to marry, she explains this decision by saying: "I had only mum's opinion and experience to rely on and agreed to do as she said. She thought that, being so much older then I was, Jim would be able to look after me. Love never came in to the conversation – that was only read about in books." This was reported in The Northern Standard and The Border Watch as a "great love story" as, with the now 19-year-old Powell travelling 1,500 miles to marry in Mount Gambier, South Australia, the couple drew broad attention. They had four children together and, following Jim Bird's death in the 1950s, Powell returned to Alice Springs and later remarried.

== Later life ==
Powell spent her later years at the Old Timers nursing home in Alice Springs, where she often shared stories with young people so they would get a feel for life at the turn of the century and "get a feel for pioneer life".

She died in 2004 and her funeral was held at the Alice Springs Telegraph Station. Her grave is located at the Alice Springs Garden Cemetery.

== Legacy ==
- Book; Powell, Pearl & McRae, Eileen (1996). By Packhorse and Buggy. Eileen McRae, Alice Springs, N.T
- Oral History; Powell's oral history (Pearl POWELL NTRS 3164 BWF 1717) is available through Library & Archives NT; it is a part of a collection of interviews by John Maddock about road transport in the NT.
- Photograph Collection; a collection of photographs taken by Powell, and her family, are a part of the Conservation Commission Northern Territory (CCNT) Collection, these images are held by Library & Archives NT, the collection in entitled "Powell-Price". These photographs follow the family and their experiences over many years and Traynor (2016) describes them as "telling the story of a happy and close family".
