= Douglas Lockwood =

Douglas Lockwood at his desk in 1950

Douglas Wright Lockwood (9 July 1918 – 21 December 1980) was an Australian newspaperman and author.

Born in Natimuk, 25 kilometres (16 mi) west of Horsham in Victoria's Wimmera district, Lockwood left school at 12 to help run his father's (Alfred Wright Lockwood) newspaper, the weekly West Wimmera Mail, at the height of the Great Depression.

With his father's blessing he left home at 16 and worked as a reporter on rural Victorian papers in Camperdown, Tatura and Mildura before being hired by Sir Keith Murdoch in 1941 as a journalist on The Herald in Melbourne. He stayed with The Herald's parent company, the Herald and Weekly Times (HWT), for the rest of his life. He also broke the Petrov affair.

At the end of 1941, during World War II, he was sent to Darwin with his new wife, Ruth (née Hay), and was there for the first Japanese attack on Australia on 19 February 1942.

After war service in the islands he returned to Darwin for the HWT group. Apart from a year in Melbourne (1948) and two in the group's London office (1954–56), Lockwood remained in Darwin, writing 12 of his 13 books, until 1968, when he became managing editor of the HWT group's two newspapers in Port Moresby. He amalgamated them to create the country's first national daily, the PNG Post-Courier. Other senior editorial management roles followed, in Melbourne, Brisbane and again in Port Moresby. He was appointed managing editor of the Bendigo Advertiser in 1975 and remained there until his death.

Lockwood won the Walkley award for journalism in 1958 for Best Piece of Newspaper Reporting -- then the highest category of the awards -- and the World's Strangest Story competition run by the London Evening News in 1957.

He died of myocardial infarction on 21 December 1980 at Bendigo, Australia.

== Bibliography ==
As sole author Lockwood published:

- Crocodiles and Other People (Cassell, London, 1959),
- Fair Dinkum (Cassell, London, 1960),
- I, the Aboriginal (Rigby, Adelaide, 1962)—which won the Adelaide Advertiser's Arts Festival Award for literature in 1962 and was later made into a television film
- We, the Aborigines (Cassell, Melbourne, 1963),
- The Lizard Eaters (Cassell, Melbourne, 1964),
- Up the Track (Rigby, Adelaide, 1964),
- Australia's Pearl Harbour (Cassell, Melbourne, 1966),
- The Front Door (Rigby, Adelaide, 1968),
- Northern Territory Sketchbook (Rigby, Adelaide, 1968), which featured drawings by Ainslie Roberts, and
- My Old Mates and I (Rigby, Adelaide, 1979).

He co-wrote Life on the Daly River (Robert Hale, London, 1961) with Nancy Polishuk; The Shady Tree (Rigby, Adelaide, 1963) with Bill Harney; and Alice on the Line (Rigby, Adelaide, 1965) with Doris Blackwell.

He started compiling selections from Bill Harney's books, but died before they were in book form. His widow, Ruth, completed the work, which was published as A Bushman's Life (Viking O'Neil, Melbourne, 1990). Lockwood's son, Kim Lockwood, and daughter, Dee Mason, are both published authors.
