= De Rose Hill, South Australia =

Cattle station and pastoral lease in South Australia

Coordinates: 26°32′55″S 133°17′25″E

De Rose Hill is a pastoral lease used as a cattle station in the far north of South Australia.

The property, which is as of 2019 owned by the Stanes family, covers approximately 1,780 km^{2} (690 sq mi), and its average annual rainfall is 9 in (230 mm) p.a. It lies on mostly deeper granite country, with oatgrass plains. Cattle are transported from the Stanes family's breeding properties, Lyndavale and Mount Ebenezer, and De Rose Hill, where they are finished for slaughter. The family also owns smaller properties closer to Adelaide, which are used for hay and fodder production for the larger properties.

Aboriginal Australian advocate and leader Lowitja O'Donoghue was born somewhere on De Rose Hill.

Native title rights exist over the station, which are managed by the De Rose Hill-Ipalka Aboriginal Corporation. The claim was made in 1994 by 12 people on behalf of the Nguraritja people. Originally refused, it won on appeal in 2005.
