= Vicki Darken =

Australian landscape painter (1923–2014)

Vicki Darken, née Victoria Ormond (10 March 1923 – 3 May 2014), was an Australian landscape painter, based in the Northern Territory.

== History ==
Darken was born in Darwin, Northern Territory, a daughter of Charles Ormond. She attended Parap Primary School and later studied Commercial subjects in Darwin, perhaps at St. Joseph's School.

As Vicki Ormond she was elected the first Miss Northern Territory.

On 25 June 1942 she married policeman Constable Bob Darken (died 17 February 2000), and their tent honeymoon is said to have given Honeymoon Gap in the Western MacDonnell Ranges, its name; subsequently they were posted to outback stations including Tennant Creek and Harts Range. Bob resigned from the force in 1950 and they settled on a station at Simpsons Gap, then moved to Alice Springs when that station was acquired by the Government as a reserve.

Darken was awarded a Churchill Fellowship in 1968, which enabled her to study painting in Europe.

She established her own gallery in 1977.

She died at Alice Springs, Northern Territory aged 91, survived by daughters Sondra and Joanne.
