= Lyndavale Station =

Cattle station in the Northern Territory of Australia

Coordinates: 25.5751°S 132.8364°E

Lyndavale Station is a cattle station in the Northern Territory of Australia. Lyndavale covers around 3,800 km^{2} (1,500 sq mi), and is located approximately 274 km (170 mi) south west of Alice Springs via the Stuart Highway.

== Background ==
Lyndavale was created from a subdivision of Erldunda station, which had been owned by the Stanes family since the 1920s (the great-grandfather of Ross Stanes), in 1987. The country consists largely of sandhills covered in mulga, much of it not highly productive. They divided the whole property into smaller paddocks when they first took it over; however, they later removed the dividing fences in the mulga area, creating a single large paddock which is managed by controlling the 25 water sources (bores) within it.

The current (as of April 2023) owners, Ross and Joanne Stanes, also own Mount Ebenezer, which abuts Lyndavale to the north. Ross' parents, Anne and John Stanes, and brother Bennett Stanes and his partner Lily Culbertson all have a connection with Lyndavale. The family also own De Rose Hill Station in South Australia (approximately 1,780 km^{2} (690 sq mi) as well as several smaller properties near Adelaide. They run mainly Angus cattle, some crossed with Charolais. The property has accredited EU and organic status (USDA).

In April 2023, a Federal Court ruling determined in favour of the native title application lodged by Anangu seven years earlier for around 10,000 km^{2} (3,900 sq mi) of pastoral lease land that includes Erldunda, Lyndavale, and Curtin Springs stations. This was the first recognition of commercial rights in Central Australia. The ruling, which was handed down by Justice Mordy Bromberg at a gathering in the remote community of Imanpa, granted traditional owners the right to hunt and perform ceremonies on the land, and also to be consulted over its use. However neither the native title holders nor the pastoralists have rights over mineral exploration, and licences for potash mining are held over the lakes. Ross Stanes welcomed the determination, saying that his family had "had a long, long relationship with [Anangu], and that both pastoralists and native title holders respected each other's rights.
