= Ernest Flint =

Australian telegraph stationmaster (1854–1887)

Ernest Ebenezer Samuel Flint (c.1854 – 17 July 1887) was an employee of the Overland Telegraph Line who spend much of his life working in the Northern Territory.

== Life in the Northern Territory ==
Little is known of Flint's early life except that he was born in Richmond, a suburb of Melbourne. At the age of 17, in late 1871, Flint began working for the Overland Telegraph Line and he travelled with a group of men from Adelaide to Alice Springs on horseback. Flint was the youngest of the group and they took with that wagonloads of equipment and stores. The party separated at Charlotte Waters briefly which led to the death of one of the members of the party, Carl Wilhelm Immanuel Kraegen, when they were unable to find water and Flint helped bury him on 20 December 1871. Kraegen was their head of operations and was to have been the station master at the Alice Springs Telegraph Station. The party arrived in Alice Springs at the very close of 1871.

Little is known of Flint's movements for the next few years although it is known that he was working as an assistant operator at the Barrow Creek Telegraph Station in 1872 and was there when it was visited by Charles Todd in August of that year and the two came to know each other well. Flint was also present there on 23 February 1874 during an attack by Kaytetye men which took place there and it was Flint who sent message of the attack over the telegraph line and later provided updates to Todd; Flint was also wounded by a spear in the thigh. Flint took no part in the reprisals that followed this attack, which resulted in the massacre of about 50 people, because of his injury. This death toll was not only made up of Kaytetye people but also Anmatyerre, Warumungu, Alyawarre and Warlpiri people who were living or travelling through the surrounding country.

On 1 January 1879 Flint became the stationmaster of the Barrow Creek Telegraph Station and, as a part of this role, he also became the justice of the peace and, within a year was appointed stationmaster at the much larger Alice Springs Telegraph Station; a significant responsibly for a still young man. in a diary of this period Frank Gillen called Flint a "giant of the interior" in a diary that he kept.

In 1882 Flint took special leave from his role to lead an exploring party to the east, in the direction of the Plenty River, and he travelled with police officer John Shirley, an Aboriginal interpreter named Paddy and two stockmen from Undoolya Station; Harry Price and F Godlee. Their aim was to recover missing stock and search for traces of Ludwig Leichhardt's lost expedition.

On 26 January 1887 Flint married Florence Clementina Madley, an English woman, in Melbourne and they returned to Alice Springs in late May 1887. In marrying Flint became the first married man in charge of the Telegraph Station and Florence the first 'white woman' to live there.

Headstone on grave, Ernest E. S. Flint, Alice Springs Telegraph Station.

Flint died a short time later, on 17 July 1887, of rheumatic fever and is buried at the small cemetery at the Alice Springs Telegraph Station which he had established. He was the second person to be buried there. In announcing his death the newspaper stated:

The name that he has made all along the line for genuine good heartedness and kindness in every way is not likely to be easily shifted to the shoulders of as deserving a successor. The officers who at one time or other came under him speak of him as the grandest man they ever had anything to do with - as generous to the lowly as those in the highest walks of life - every inch a thorough man

— Death of Mr Ernest Flint, North Australian (Darwin), 23 July 1887

Shortly after her husbands death Florence returned to England.

== Legacy ==
The following locations in the Northern Territory are named for Flint:

- Flint Court in The Gap, Northern Territory
- Flint Street in Jingili, Northern Territory
- Mount Ebenezer, near Imanpa, Northern Territory
