= Mount Ebenezer =

Pastoral station in Northern Territory, Australia

Coordinates: 25.177°S 132.677°E

Location in the Northern Territory

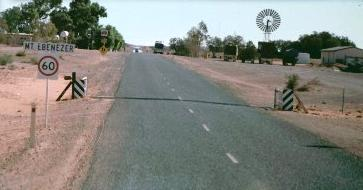
Mt Ebenezer in 1986

Mount Ebenezer Station is a pastoral lease that operates as a cattle station in the Northern Territory of Australia.

== Location ==
It is situated about 171 kilometres (106 mi) north east of Yulara and 205 kilometres (127 mi) south west of Alice Springs. The lease shares a boundary with other pastoral leases including Angas Downs to the west, Lyndavale to the south, Erldunda to the south east and Palmer Valley to the north west. The Lasseter Highway bisects the property from east to west.

== History ==
The property takes its name from the 100 metres (328 ft) peak Mount Ebenezer that is found in the Baselow Range within the station boundaries. Mount Ebenezer is named after Ebenezer Flint, who was delivering supplies to telegraph stations in the area in 1871.

The pastoralist Richard Warburton, took up Erldunda Station to the east of Mount Ebenezer in 1822. Warburton is thought to have passed through the area while mustering stray cattle. William Liddle took up the nearby Angas Downs Station in 1922.

The Mount Ebenezer Roadhouse was closed for several months in 2012. When William O'Donnell signed a lease to reopen the roadhouse, he was driven from the property by a spear-wielding Indigenous man. The owners of the roadhouse terminated the contract shortly afterwards.

In 2014, the 1,640-square-kilometre (633 sq mi) property was on the market along with at least 15 others in the Kimberley and Northern Territory. By 2019, the Stanes family, who also owned Lyndavale, NT; De Rose Hill in South Australia; and other smaller properties in SA, had bought the property.

== See also ==
- List of ranches and stations
