= Honeymoon Gap =

Pass in Northern Territory, Australia

Honeymoon Pass
- Location within Northern Territory

Third Approach
- Location: Hugh
- Range: West MacDonnell Ranges
- Coordinates: 23°44′26″S 133°44′34″E

Honeymoon Gap is a small gap 1 km south of Larapinta Drive, 14 km west of Alice Springs, on Roe Creek, 8 km south of where it cuts through Simpsons Gap. The Arrernte name for the Gap is Angatyepe (pronounced ung-ah-chupah) and it is associated with Perentie (Goanna) Dreaming. There is an outstation nearby that shares this name nearby (this was established as a part of the homelands movement).

The official name of the gap is Temple Bar Gap, which is never used, and Honeymoon Gap is the name for the pass that goes through it.

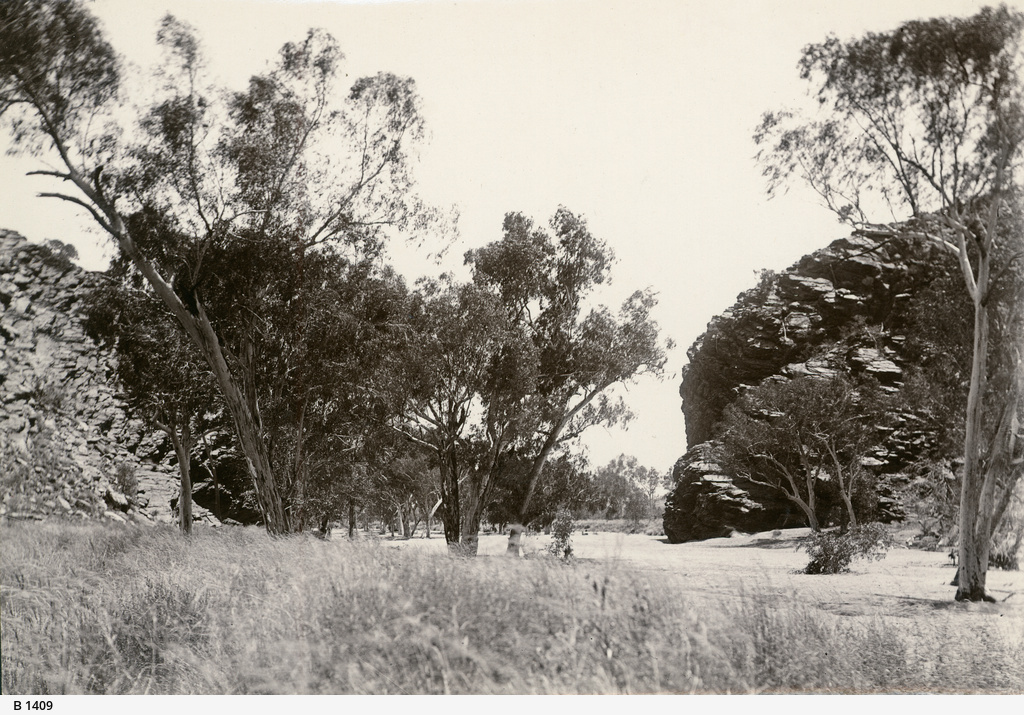
Honeymoon Gap in c1880, it was then known as Temple Bar Gap

== History ==
Honeymoon Gap was originally called Temple Bar by surveyors constructing the Australian Overland Telegraph Line and it was first named by Gilbert McMinn who, alongside William Mills, camped there on 17 February 1871. It is unclear why the name Temple Bar was given, although it likely relates to the original Temple Bar in London. It is thought that McMinn believed this gap would be the gateway that would enable the telegraph line to pass through, however, only days later he and Mills would find the wider Heavitree Gap where the line would ultimately travel through.

The gap is of great significance to the Arrernte people, the traditional owners of the land, and it is said that Unchalka (or Ntyarlke, later tagged 'King Charlie'), an important senior Arrente man, was at the Gap when the first white man came through and "approached them in a spirit of friendship". He would later recall this story to his grand-daughter Amelia Kunoth. No record is made of this meeting in official records of the day and it was excluded from Mills reports to Charles Todd. Before the telegraph line was even completed leases were granted for the first cattle stations in Central Australia and on 1 April 1872 Ned Bagot, a contractor on the telegraph line, was given the right to graze cattle from Honeymoon Gap to, almost, the Ross River; no thought was given to how this would impact the Arrernte people.

The name Temple Bar Gap fell out of favour following the site becoming the honeymoon location for Robert (Bob) and Victoria (Vicki) Darken who married at the Alice Springs Methodist Church on 25 June 1942. Bob Darken was given a week's leave from the army and the couple planned to camp for a week at the gap and borrowed a car and a tent. The couple had repeated issues with the car and it rained for most of the week so, concerned for their safety, friends decided to visit them regularly; they said they were "going to see the honeymooners" or "going to honeymoon gap".

It was not until 1981 that the name of the pass was officially changed to Honeymoon Gap and, in 2004, the NT Place Names Committee agreed that, despite not being used, the official name of the gap should remain Temple Bar Gap.
