= Imanpa, Northern Territory =

Imanpa
- Suburb
- Coordinates: 25°07′07″S 132°34′08″E
- Country: Australia
- State: Northern Territory
- LGA: MacDonnell Region
- Location: 1,419 km (882 mi) S of Darwin
- Established: 4 April 2007

Government
  - Territory electorate: Namatjira
  - Federal division: Lingiari

Area
  - Total: 16.278 km^{2} (6.285 sq mi)
- Elevation (weather station): 490 m (1,610 ft)

Population
  - Total: 124 (2021 census)
  - Density: 7.618/km^{2} (19.73/sq mi)
- Time zone: UTC+9:30 (ACST)
- Postcode: 0872
- Mean max temp: 29.7 °C (85.5 °F)
- Mean min temp: 13.5 °C (56.3 °F)
- Annual rainfall: 240.0 mm (9.45 in)
Suburbs around Imanpa
Ghan	Ghan	Ghan
Ghan	Imanpa	Ghan
Ghan	Ghan	Ghan

Imanpa, formerly the Mount Ebenezer homestead, is a remote community in the Northern Territory of Australia, renamed on 4 April 2007 after the eponymous administrative area.

It is on the lands of the Pitjantjatjara people.

== Location ==
Imanpa is 160 km (99 mi) east of Uluru (Ayers Rock), 200 km (120 mi) southwest of Alice Springs and 7 km (4.3 mi) north of the Lasseter Highway, the main road between Uluru and the Stuart Highway.

== Facilities ==
Imanpa is 17 km (11 mi) from the Mount Ebenezer Roadhouse, which was owned and run by the community until it closed in 2019 along with the Angas Downs Indigenous Protected Area.

It has a police station.

== Demographics ==
At the 2021 Australian census, Imanpa had a population of 124.

== Native title determination ==
In April 2023, a Federal Court ruling determined in favour of the native title application lodged by Anangu seven years earlier for around 10,000 km^{2} (3,900 sq mi) of pastoral lease land that includes Erldunda, Lyndavale, and Curtin Springs stations. The ruling, which was handed down by Justice Mordy Bromberg at a gathering in Imanpa, was the first recognition of commercial rights in Central Australia.
