= Len Tuit =

Australian tourism pioneer (1911–1976)

Leonard Roy Tuit or Len Tuit (1911–1976) was a pioneer in Central Australian road transport and tourism and is credited as being the first person to recognised the tourism potential of Uluru.

== Early life ==
Tuit was born at Prospect in South Australia in 1911 and is the son of Clarence and Olive Tuit.

== Life in the Northern Territory ==
Tuit arrived in Alice Springs in 1932 after an eleven-day journey in a Diamond T truck and started doing contract driver work for David Baldock, primarily driving between Alice Springs and Tennant Creek, which he did for the next three years.

In 1936 Tuit established his own business after acquiring a Ford V8 transporting perishables to the remote mining communities at The Granites and Tanami. In 1937 Tuit's first wife died following a long illness.

During World War II Tuit was the major civilian transport link between Alice Springs and Birdum as well as continuing, under military supervision, to supply mining communities; now including the mica mines at Wauchope and Hatches Creek. In 1939 Tuit married Pearl Arthur (née Brandt) and adopted her son Malcolm, from her previous marriage.

Following the War Tuit won a five-year mail contract after proving that he could transport the mail between Alice Springs and Darwin in three days, which was faster than the Commonwealth Railways (from Birdum to Darwin). He combined the mail run with a passenger service, in a modified K5 International and it was known as 'The Butterbox'. The truck was very basic and was fitted with bench seats and had a canvas canopy and it would not have been an easy trip for its passengers.

Tuit's first experience with tourism was taking students from Alice Springs to Palm Valley in 1944 and, in 1950, he took the first ever tour group, from Knox Grammar School in Sydney to Uluru (within what is now the Uluṟu-Kata Tjuṯa National Park). Tuit would continue to take occasional tours to Uluru and he, and his wife Pearl, lobbied the government to have Central Australia promoted as a tourist destination; the government was determined that "there was no future in tourism for the NT" and that Uluru, then known as Ayers Rock, would be seen only as a "lump of rock".

The Tuit's persisted and they were granted the first tourist lease in 1953 and, by 1955, were offering regular tours there. These early tours could carry approximately 20 passengers and the only accommodation was tents with an ex-army marquee set up as a dining and store room. By 1958 Tuit was taking 2,000 people to Uluru. Because of the success in the tourism side of the business, which also more suited his free spirit Tuit gave up, and sold his interest, in the transport side of the business.

Tuit and Bert Bond, another Central Australian tour operator, were fierce competitors and they each maintained an arduous schedule to attract passengers. In 1952 the two men decided to merge their businesses and, on 16 October 1953, the Centralian Advocate reported a parting of the ways and that the businesses would once again operate separately: this was finalised by 3 December 1954. Reasons for the collapse of this partnership are speculative but presumed to be based around differing personalities and approaches.

In 1957 Tuit bought Bond out when he left the Northern Territory in 1956 and, despite not wanting to, had to partner with Pioneer Tours due to financial difficulties. The business became 'Pioneer-Tuit Tours Ltd of Alice Springs'.

== Later life ==
Tuit died on 15 May 1976 in Queensland.

== Gallery ==
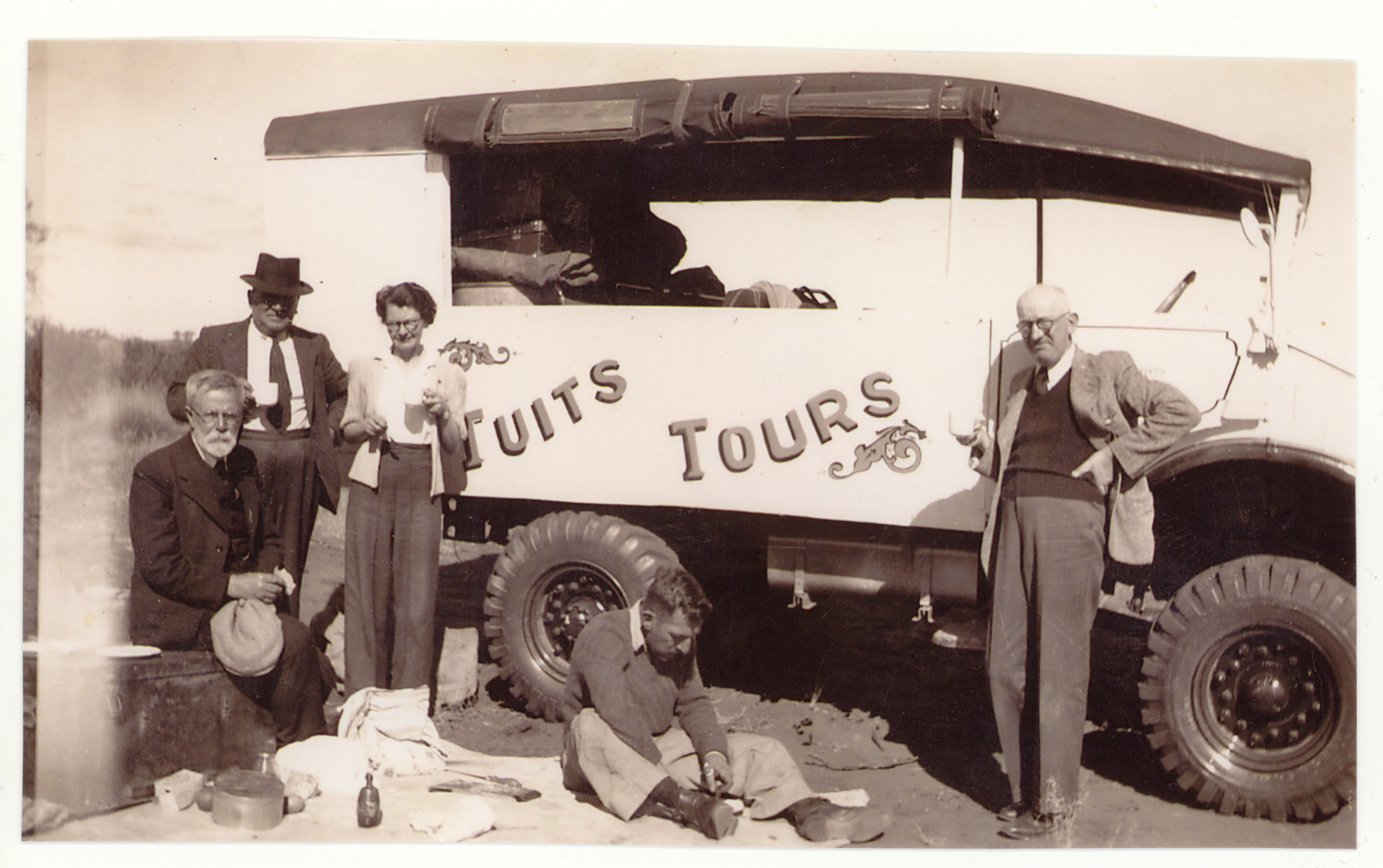
A Tuit's tour bus in 1946

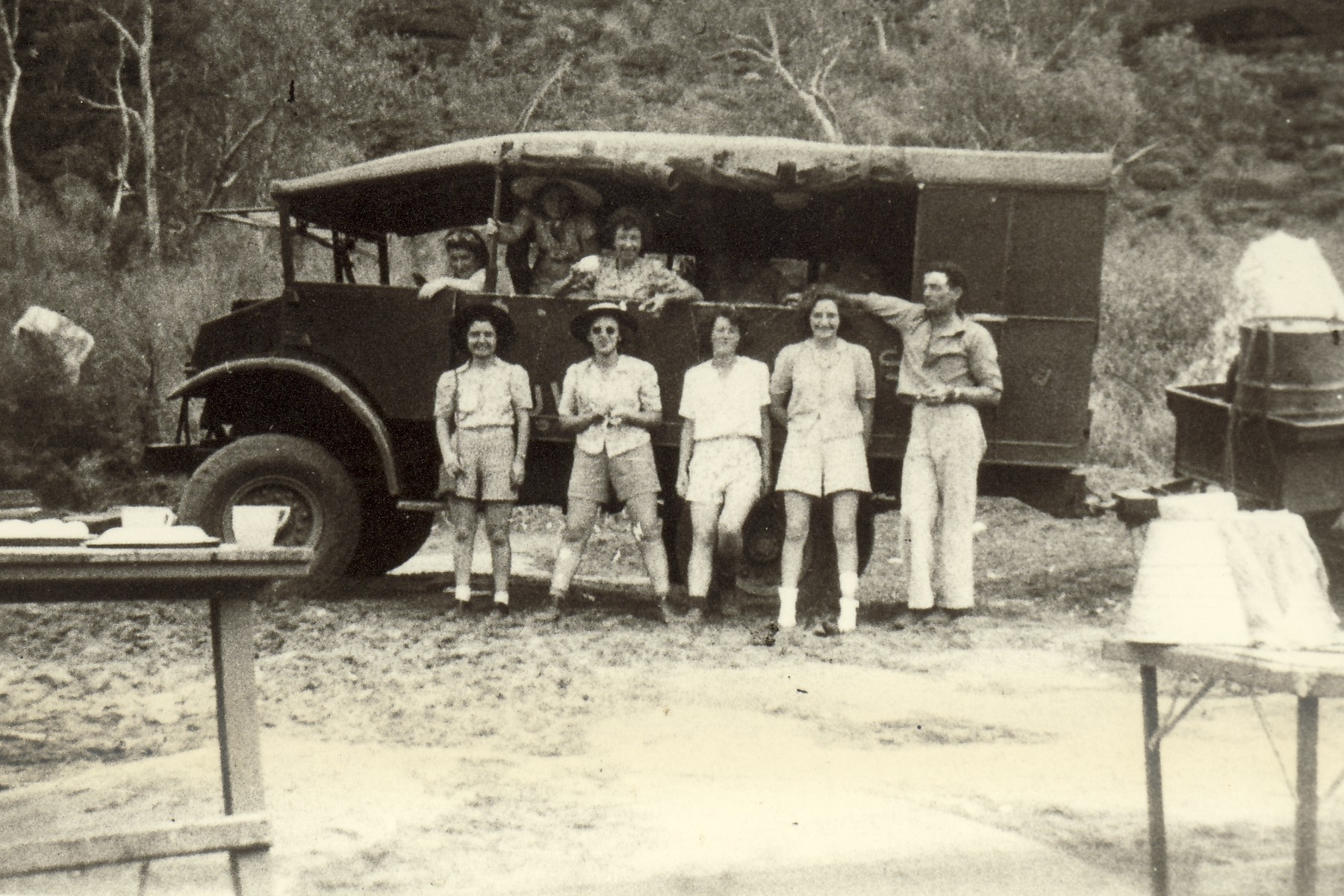
Photo from a Tuit's Tour, 1947

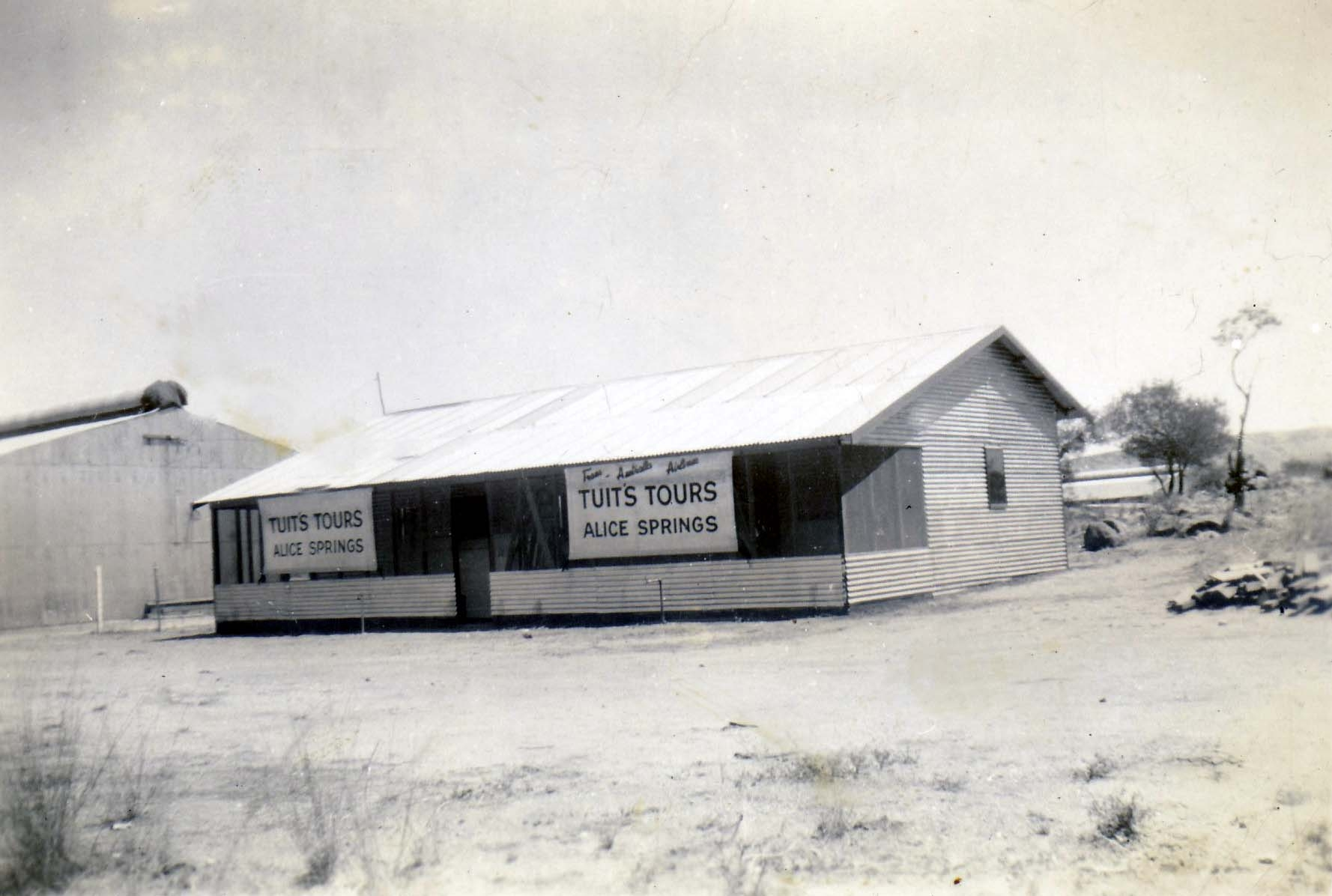
Tuit's Depot, c. 1950s

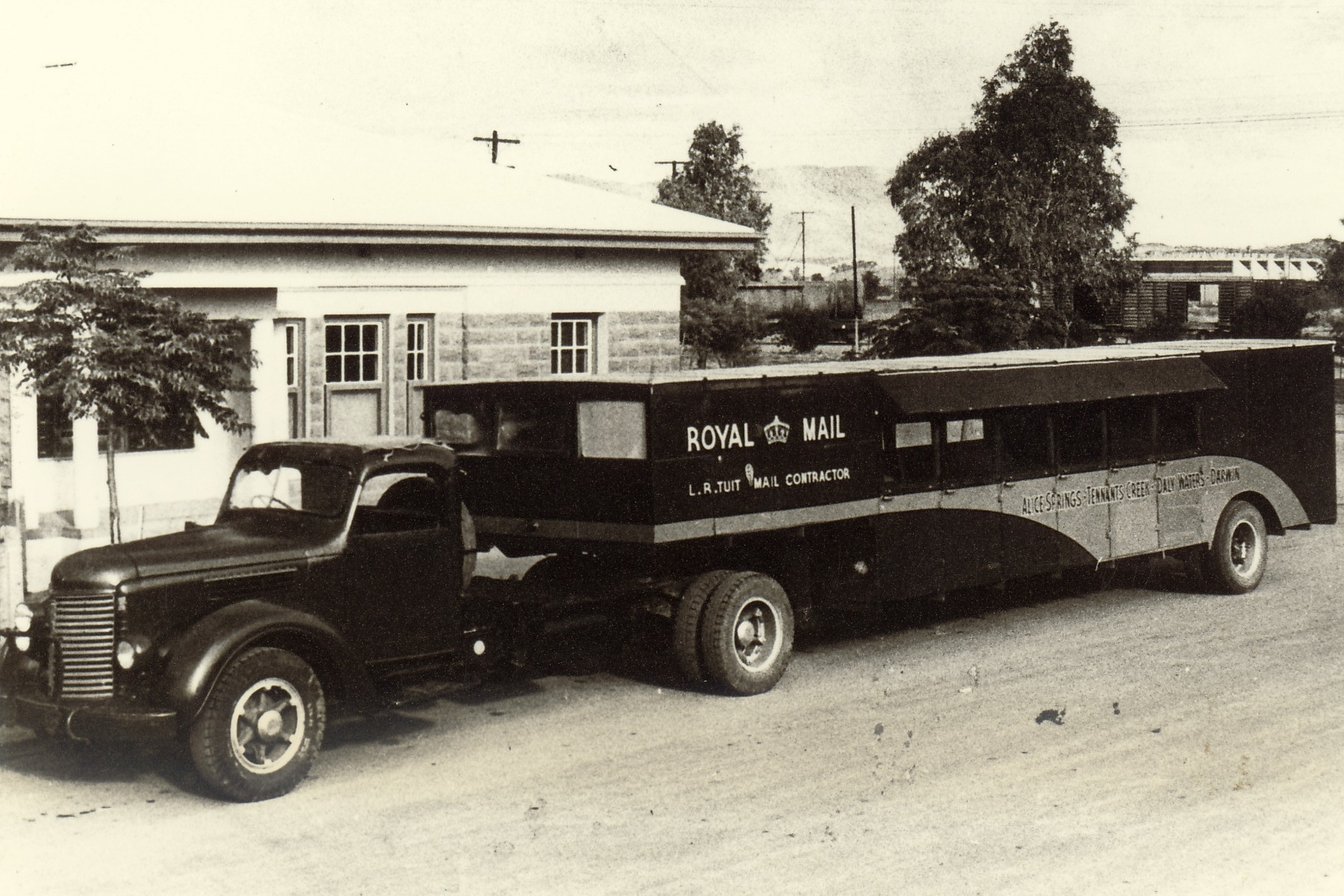
A Tuit vehicle acting as a mail contractor, pictured outside the Alice Springs Post Office, c. 1950s

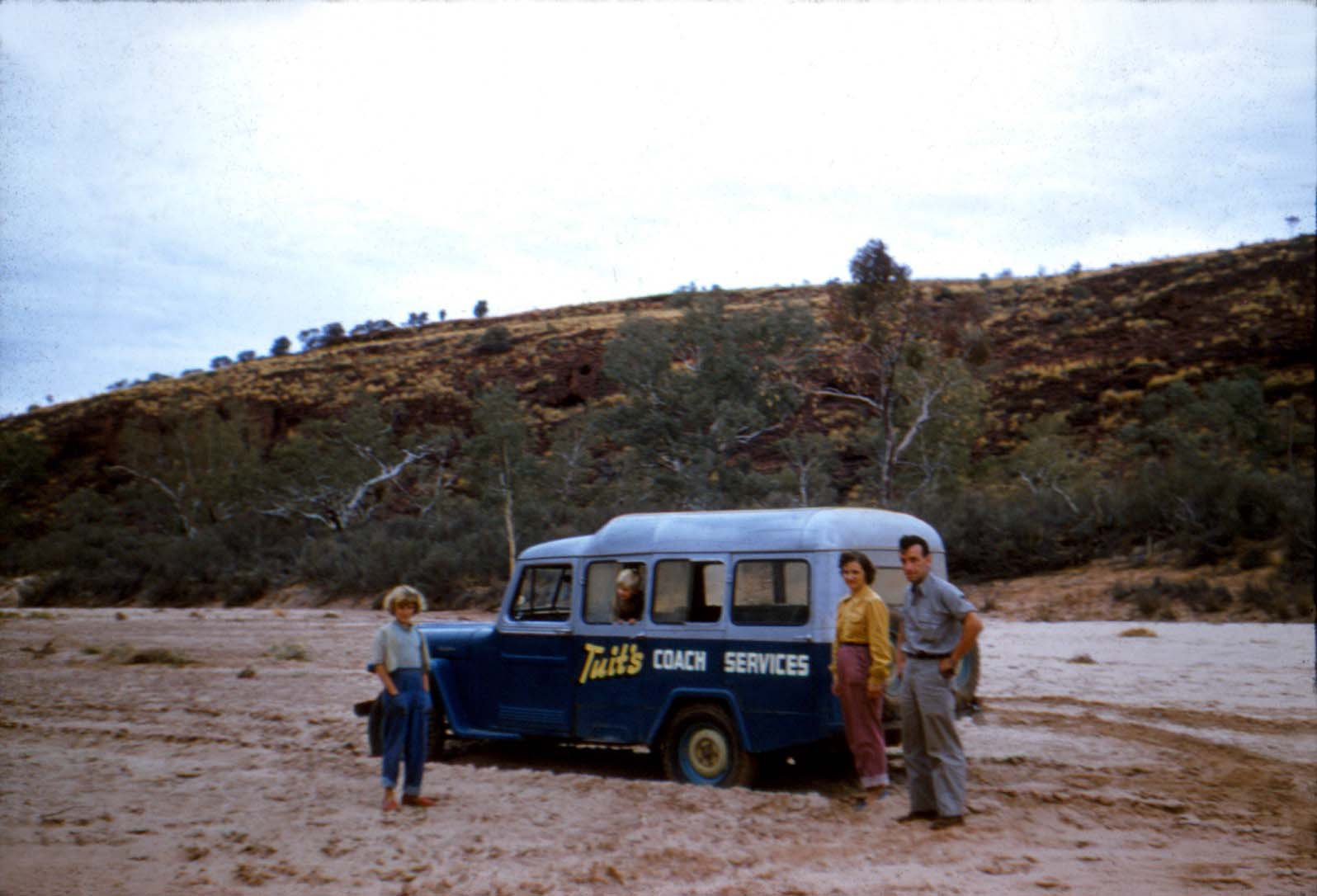
8-seater Jeep, a part of Tuit's Coach Services, bogged in Finke River, c. 1957

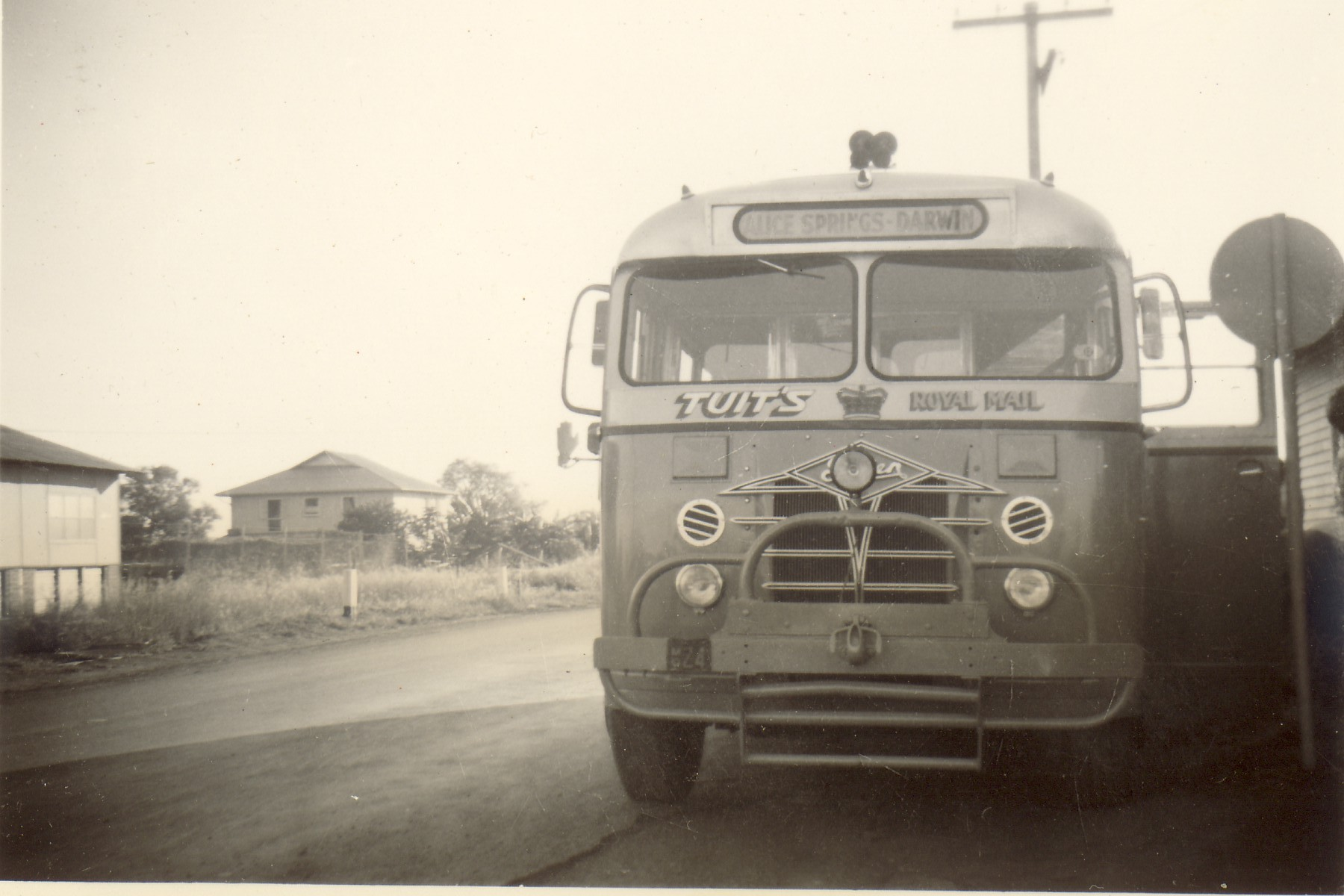
The Darwin service operated by Tuit in 1957

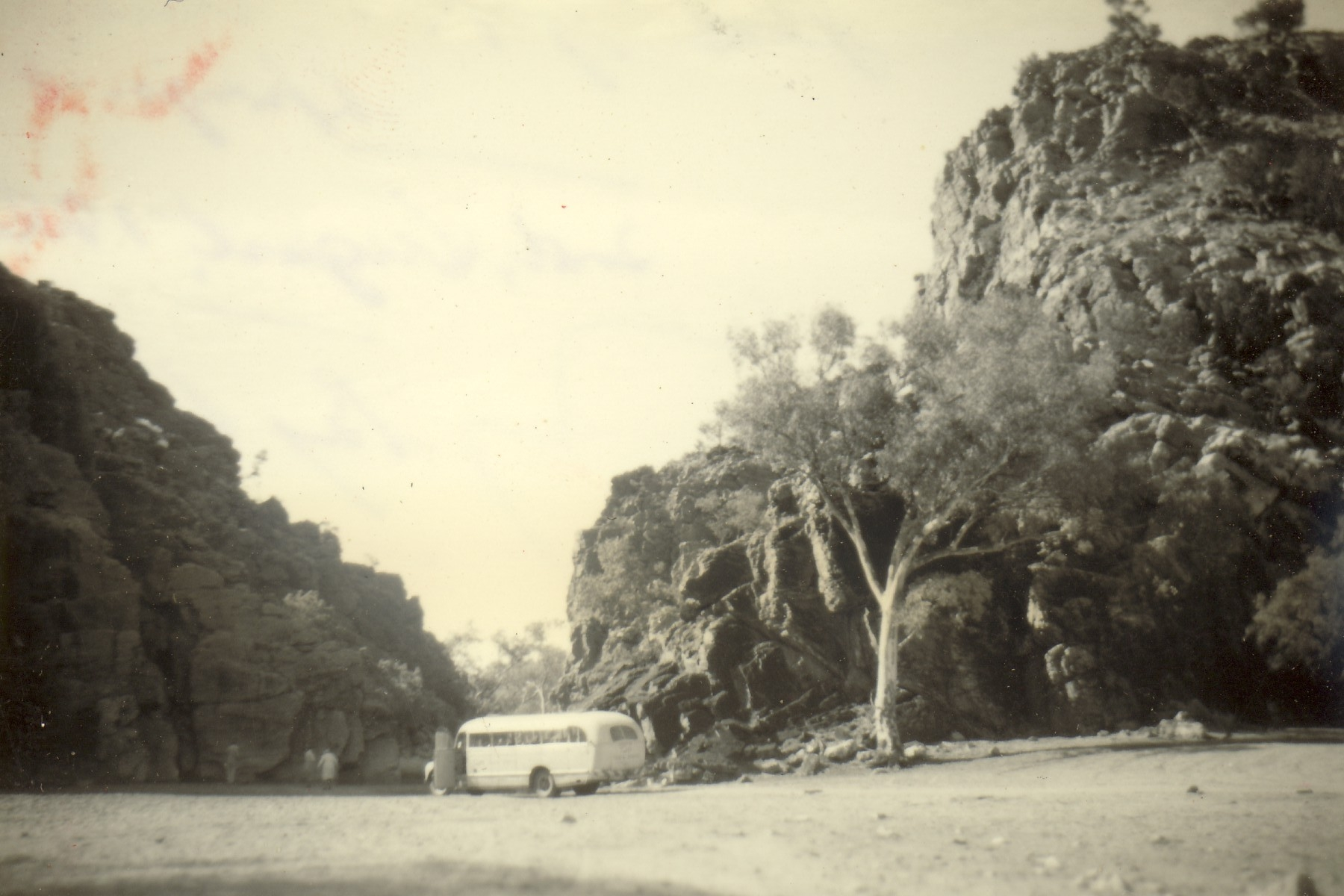
A Tuit's bus at Emily Gap (Anthwerrke), c. 1957

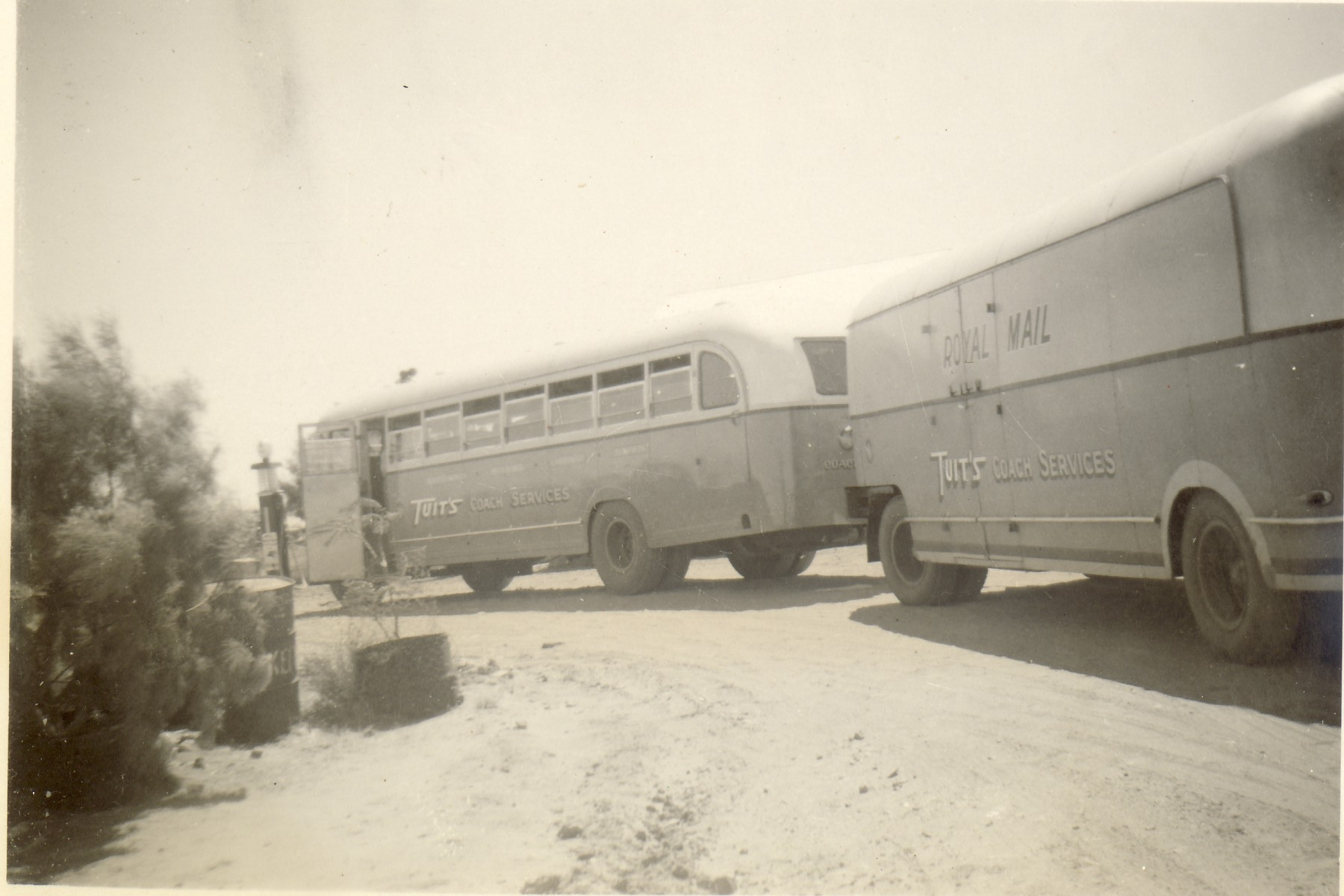
A Tuit's bus in the late 1950s
