= Alice Springs Telegraph Station =

Telegraph station in the Alice Springs, Australia

Coordinates: 23.672°S 133.888°E

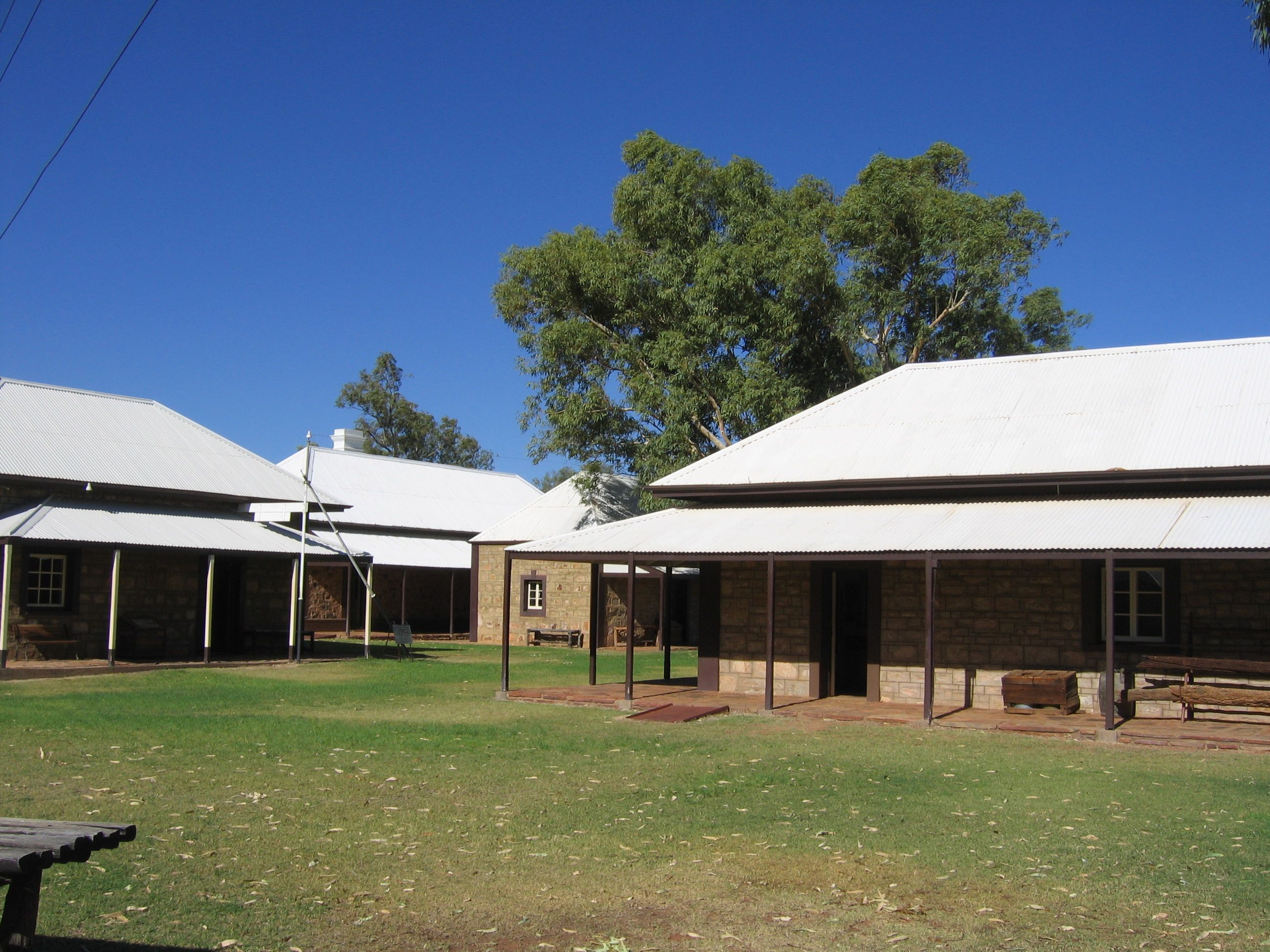
Alice Springs Telegraph Station

The Alice Springs Telegraph Station is located within the Alice Springs Telegraph Station Historical Reserve, four kilometres north of the Alice Springs town centre in the Northern Territory of Australia. Established in 1872 to relay messages between Darwin and Adelaide, it is the original site of the first European settlement in central Australia. It was one of twelve stations along the Overland Telegraph Line.

== History ==
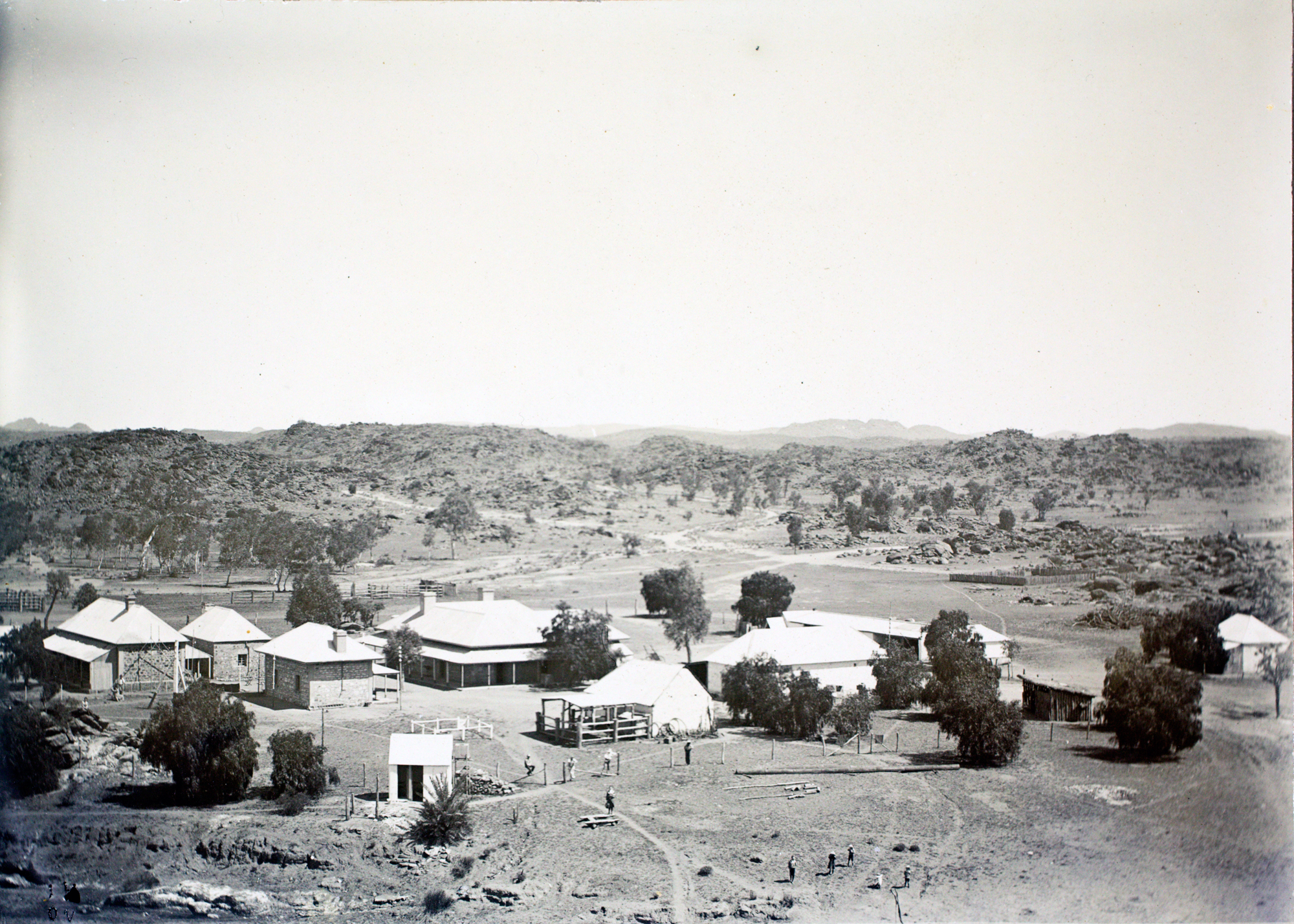
Alice Springs telegraph station buildings in 1905

European exploration of central Australia began in 1860. John McDouall Stuart successfully crossed the continent from north to south on his third attempt in 1863. He passed through the MacDonnell Ranges through Brinkley Bluff, although the terrain was considered to be too rough for the Overland Telegraph Line. The site of the Alice Springs Telegraph Station was first recorded by surveyor William Mills in March 1871, who was in search of a suitable route for the line through the MacDonnell Ranges. It was officially recorded that, while surveying, Mills came across a waterhole, which was a significant camping and ceremonial site for the Arrernte people, an Aboriginal group who still occupy Arrernte lands around Alice Springs. Known as Turiara. The creation story of this waterhole, known as Atherreyrre, describes an old Arunga (euro) man walking along the river and scratching out the waterhole. Mills named it Alice Springs after Alice Todd, the wife of his employer Charles Todd, the head of the overland telegraph project at the time.

There is, however, an alternative story, recalled by Errumphana [Ampetyane] to his granddaughter Amelia Kunoth, that he was among a group of warriors who came across the group at Honeymoon Gap and, in the spirit of friendship led them to the waterhole. He remembered being unsure, when first seeing the group, whether the strangers and their horses had blood or not. Errumphana was later called King Charlie by the Telegraph Station men.

Construction of the telegraph station began adjacent to the waterhole in November 1871 under the supervision of Gilbert Rotherdale McMinn. A number of structures were eventually built, including a harness room, buggy shed, police station, blacksmith's workshop, telegraph office, kitchen building and station master's residence. Supplies arrived from Adelaide just once per year, so self-sufficiency was critical. Stockyards and a large garden area were also developed. While the waterhole supplied the settlement with water, a well was later sunk to maintain supply during drought periods. After completion, the telegraph station operated for 60 years.

== Postmasters ==
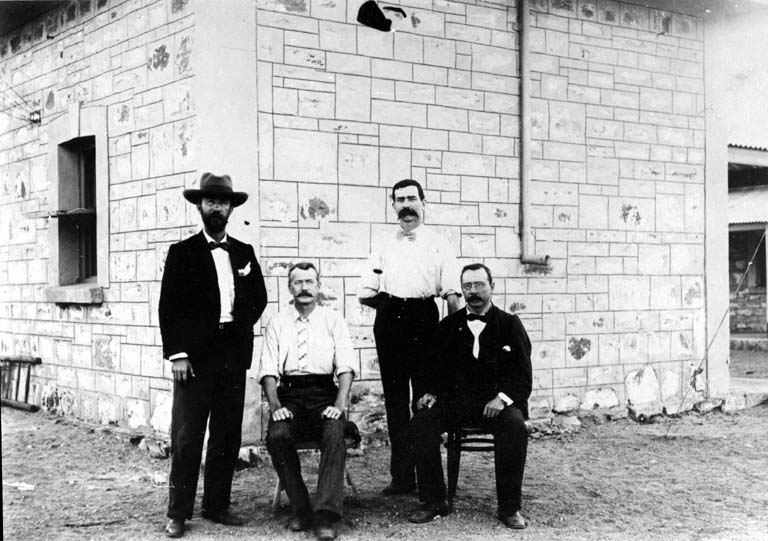
Staff at the Alice Springs Telegraph Station

Postmasters	From	To
Johannes Ferdinand Mueller	1 July 1875	31 August 1879
Ernest Ebenezer Samuel Flint	1 September 1879	17 July 1887
Joseph Skinner	1 September 1887	30 November 1892
Francis James Gillen	1 December 1892	31 March 1899
Thomas Andrew Bradshaw	1 April 1899	1908
John McKay	17 July 1908	1916
Frederick Alfred Price	1916	1924
Ernest Allchurch	1924	1932

Additional details:

- Mueller (1853 - 1 January 1922), the first postmaster, became Warden of Goldfields at Arltunga after leaving the Telegraph Station. He was dismissed from the role on 25 July 1906 and was later found guilty of having embezzled £42 at Arltunga on 4 May 1905 and sentenced to six months in Port Augusta Gaol. After completing his sentence he returned to the same goldfield as a prospector. He would later become the bookkeeper at Bond Springs station where cattleman Jim Turner came to know him well; he described him as an educated man who "enjoyed his liquor, often to excess, a habit which hindered the execution of his duty at times but not his popularity". He would die following a fall from a sulky at Wigley Waterhole nearby the telegraph Station. Mueller Street in East Side, Alice Springs is named after him.
- Bradshaw (1859 – 28 August 1934) joined the Post and Telegraph Department in 1878. He worked as a telegraph operator in Adelaide before being appointed postmaster of the Alice Springs Telegraph Station on 1 April 1899. Bradshaw and his family left Alice Springs in 1908 and Bradshaw continued to work as a postmaster at various locations in South Australia. In July 1924 he was forced to retire when he reached the age of 65 and his request to continue working was rejected by the Commonwealth Public Services Board. He unsuccessfully tried to sue the Commonwealth in 1925 for wrongful dismissal in the High Court of Australia. Bradshaw Primary School in Alice Springs is named after him.
- Pearl Powell (14 December 1909 – 24 May 2004) was the daughter of postmaster Fred Price, who documented her life growing up at the station in her memoir By Packhorse and Buggy (1996).

== The Bungalow ==
The station closed in 1932 following the construction of a new post office. It was then used as an institution for "half-caste" Aboriginal children known as The Bungalow, which was moved there from Jay Creek. An area of 273 hectares (670 acres) including the telegraph station was proclaimed an Aboriginal reserve by the Department of Native Affairs on 8 December 1932. Its purpose was to provide residence and education services to part-Aboriginal children ("half-castes").

The Freemans were the first Superintendent and Matron at the new location. It closed in 1942 when children were evacuated south in response to World War II. The majority of the children from the institution were sent south to Mulgoa in New South Wales and Balaklava in South Australia. The buildings were taken over by the Australian Army.

== World War II ==
During World War II parts of the station were used by the Australian Army between 1942 and 1945. It was used as the Native Labour Headquarters. It was returned to the Native Affairs Department in 1945 after the war. The station became an Aboriginal Reserve until 1963, when many Aboriginal people moved to Amoonguna, an Aboriginal Community southeast of Alice Springs.

== Current use ==
The station is on land proclaimed as a reserve on 5 June 1962 and now part of the Alice Springs Telegraph Station Historical Reserve. A number of stone buildings have now been restored. The historical reserve was listed on the now-defunct Register of the National Estate in 1980. It was listed on the Northern Territory Heritage Register on 19 April 2004. It is now operated as a tourist attraction, cafe and mountain biking destination.
