= Amelia Kunoth =

Indigenous Australian farmer (c. 1880s-1984)

Amelia Kunoth née Pavey (c. 1880s – 1984) was an Aboriginal Australian woman who developed well-known cattle stations in Central Australia, including Utopia, Bond Springs, Hamilton Downs and Tempe Downs.

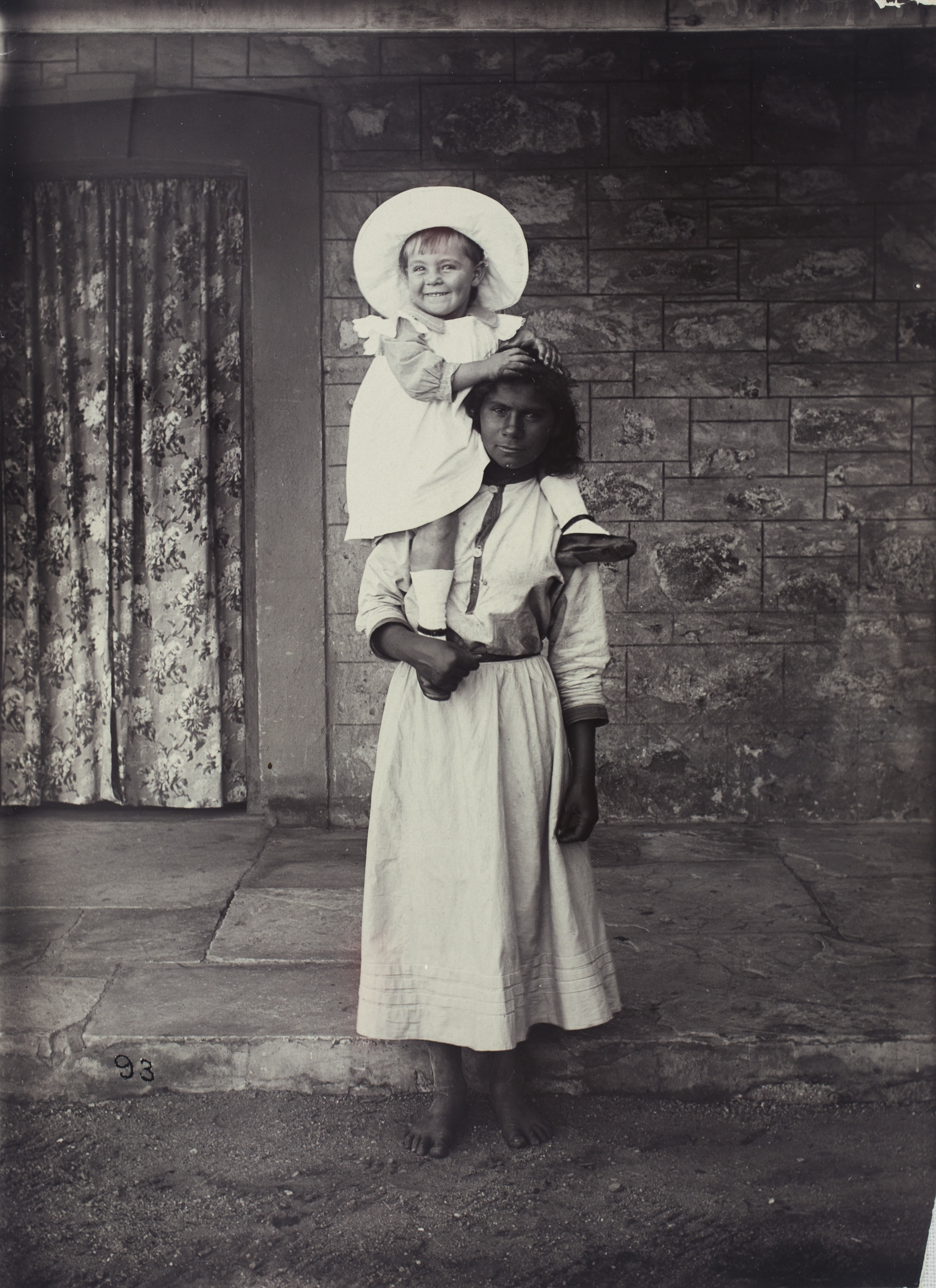
Amelia Kunoth, née Pavey, holding Edna Bradshaw at the Alice Springs Telegraph Station. Photo dated 1906.

== Early life ==
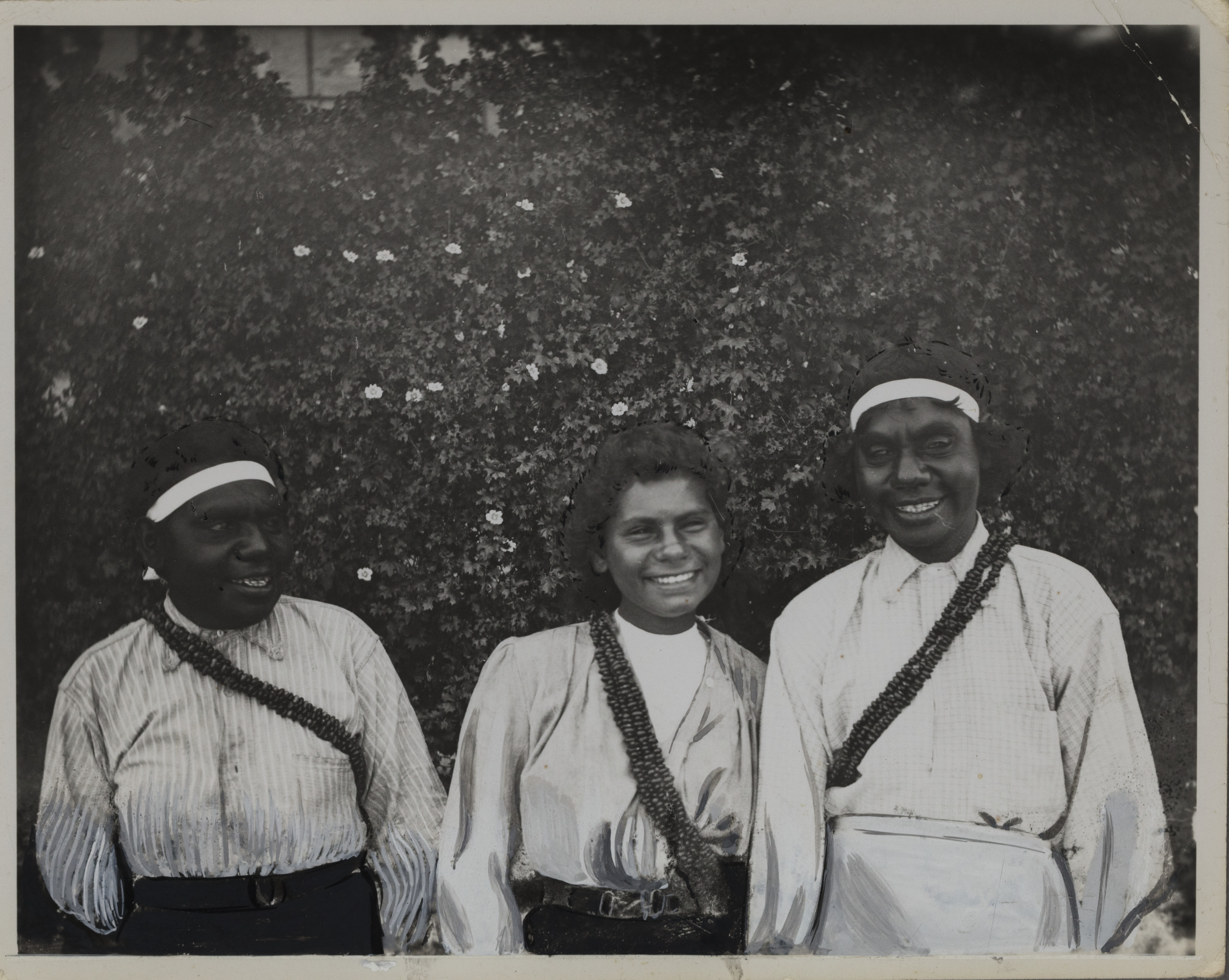
Bradshaw family's housegirls, left to right, Amboora, Amelia and Rungie in 1906.

Kunoth was the granddaughter of Unchalka/Erruphana (also called King Charlie) who controlled the land around Alice Springs before the white man came and decided who could enter his country through Heavitree Gap. Dick Kimber records his name as Errumphana [Ampetyane].

There is a story, told by Arrernte descendants today, that Unchalka and other Aboriginal men were at Honeymoon Gap when the first white man came through the area. People say that he approached them in a spirit of friendship and offered them water and some also say that he showed them the way to the Atherreyrre, a waterhole which would be renamed the Alice Springs Waterhole, and was directly next to what would become the Alice Springs Telegraph Station). When Unchalka recounted this story to Kunoth she saw this as an example that colour should never cause barriers.

Despite this account there was no mention of this made by surveyor William Mills. Unchalka was also the principal informant on ceremonial matters to Francis James Gillen, a former Alice Springs Telegraph Station station master turned anthropologist.

Her father was butcher Edgar Pavey, one of the first European residents in Alice Springs, which was then known as Stuart, and a local Arrernte woman whose name is not recorded. There is no official record of her birth and, at her death, there were conflicting reports that put her age at 93 or more than 103.

It does not appear that Kunoth was raised by her father and, after her mother died when she was very young, she lived at the Alice Springs Telegraph Station and was "brought up" by the Bradshaw Family, the family of the station master Thomas Bradshaw. From a young age she then worked for them as a companion and nurse for their seven children; it is said that she was so loved that she was almost a part of the family. This period of her life in recorded in some detail in Alice on the Line, written by one of the children, Doris Blackwell, who remembers her as a significant figure in her early life. When the Bradshaw family left Alice Springs, in 1908, according to Blackwell:

Our pretty little half-caste nursegirl, Amelia, wept for days when she learnt that we were leaving. She begged and implored mother to take her too. Like all aborigines, she had come to love the children she cared for as though they were her own, I thought my heart would break. Mother was so disturbed by her grief that she talked it over with my father, but both agreed it would be foolish and no kindness to the girl to take her so far from her tribe, with little hope of getting back if she once grew homesick, as she inevitably would.

— Doris Blackwell, Alice on the Line (1918)

Kunoth recalled in her oral history that she never attended school and that, although, there was no formal school set up in Alice Springs at that time Atalanta Bradshaw, the wife of Thomas Bradshaw and Blackwells mother, did want her to attend classes with the children but she declined; preferring to do work around the home. Kunoth and Doris Blackwell would send letters to each other for much of their lives.

Despite this description as being part of the Bradshaw family, it is elsewhere recorded (by Gordon Briscoe) that she did not live with them but worked as a "day girl" and lived at a camp on the opposite side of the river. Briscoe describes that she would go to work each day, shower and dress in clean clothes as an unpaid domestic servant and then, at the setting of the sun, leave her clean clothes and return to her camp in rags.

== Working life, marriage and children ==
After the Bradshaws left, Kunoth stayed on at the telegraph station, now doing laundry for the telegraph operators and other single male staff at the station. Kunoth developed an ongoing relationship with Harry Kunoth, who was then working as a linesman (sometimes recorded as a blacksmith) and this relationship, which had resulted in two children by 1911 (one deceased), drew the attention of the newly arrived Robert Stott. Stott took over from John Dow as the senior police officer in Central Australia and, in this position, was the Sub-Protector of Aborigines. Stott, concerned about the mixed-race nature of the relationship, made the linesman promise that he would end the relationship but, after another child was born, it was clear this had not happened and John McKay, the then station master, decided that he would send Kunoth away to Hermannsburg, which was then operating as a Lutheran mission. In a seeming change of heart, and after Harry Kunoth appealed to him, Stott granted him a licence to employ her, causing tension between McKay, Stott and Harry Kunoth. Following this Harry Kunoth decided to leave the telegraph station and briefly worked as a mounted constable with the South Australian Police Force, with Stott.

A number of years later, and before they moved to Bond Springs Station in 1916, the pair married, and they spent their lives together managing a number of Central Australian cattle stations, where Kunoth acted as the cook for all the station hands and ran the home. On 11 October 1939 it was declared in The Northern Standard that Kunoth "shall not be deemed to be a half-caste for the purposes of the Aboriginal Ordinance 1918 - 1939". This change would have meant that Kunoth was not restricted to the various implications of this legislation that enforced "prohibited areas", restrictions on alcohol, legal rights as far as arrest and employment and the ability for the government to remove children from care. This legislation also made the Chief Protector of Aborigines the legal guardian of every Aboriginal child, which likely had consequences for Kunoth's children. Despite this it is recorded that at least three of Kunoth's grandchildren, Sandra, Sam and Ngala (who would go on to be known as Rosalie Kunoth-Monks), spent time at the Stolen Generations-associated institution St. Mary's Hostel (Alice Springs).

Kunoth and her husband had eight surviving children together and, by the time of her death at the end of 1984, more than 50 great-grandchildren and a number of great-great-grandchildren.

== Legacy ==
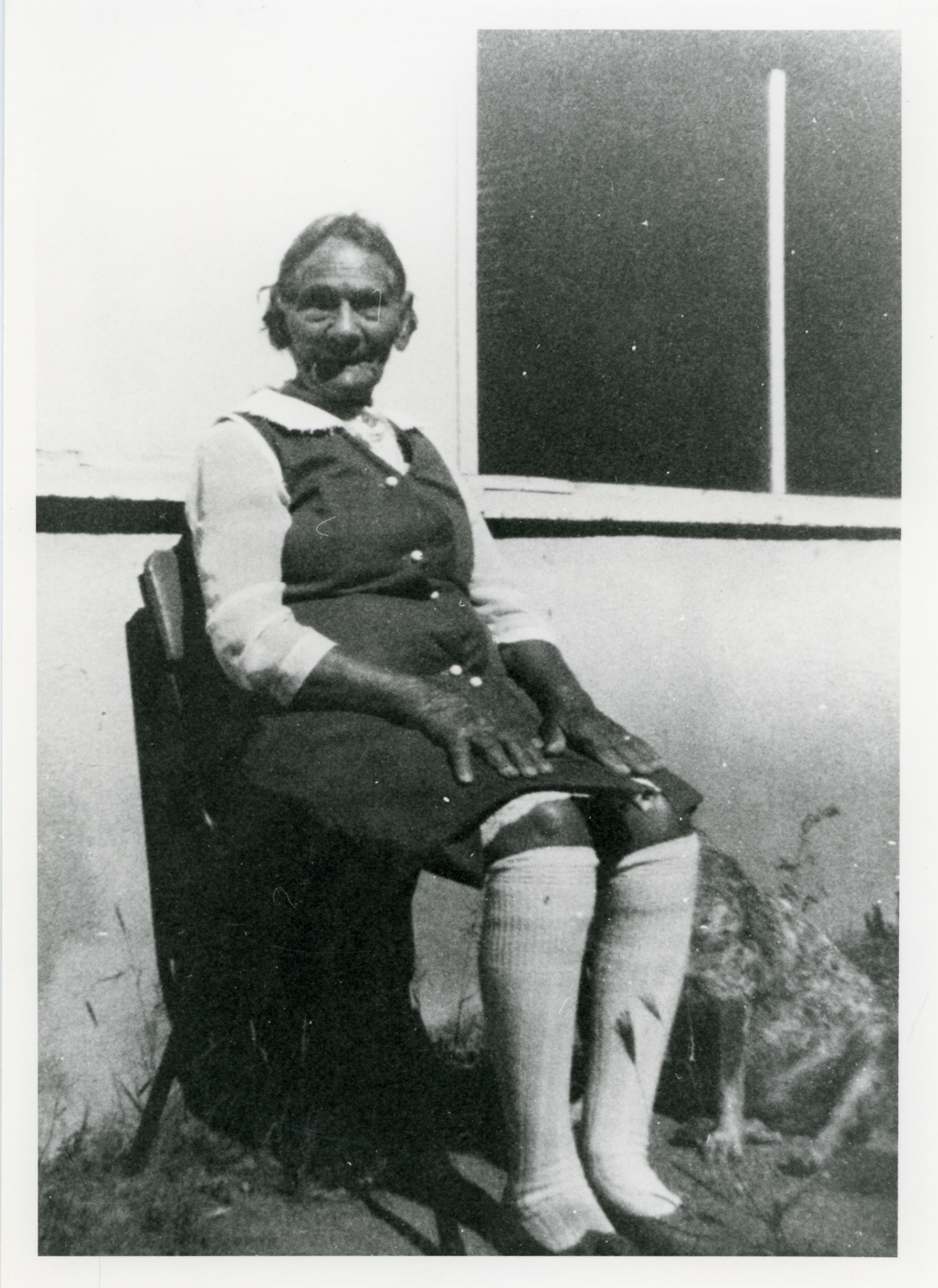
Amelia Kunoth in her later years, c. 1977

Kuthoth is said to have taught her children to have pride in their Aboriginal heritage but always insisted that they have a European education as well. She is the grandmother of Rosalie Kunoth-Monks, who gained national fame for her role in the film Jedda and went on to become very active both for her community and in politics more broadly.

Upon Kunoth's death the local newspaper, The Centralian Advocate, published an article saying that:

Mrs Kunoth was a true lady of the bush and was a resident of Alice Springs since the town was surveyed.

On Utopia Station they talk of her as if she was a saint.

In Alice Springs so many children called her "nana" that her real grand-daughter Mrs Rosalie Kunoth-Monks, when young, would shout jealously: "She's my nana, not yours."

— Jenny Brands, A grand old lady of the bush dies: Amelia Kunoth, daughter of Alice's owner., Centralian Advocate; 09 January 1985

Her oral history, recorded when she was 97 (as noted earlier this age is not definitive and open to debate), is available through Library & Archives NT: NTRS 226 TS 257.
