= Maryvale Station =

Cattle station, pastoral lease, Northern Territory of Australia

Coordinates: 24.6741°S 134.0722°E

Location in the Northern Territory

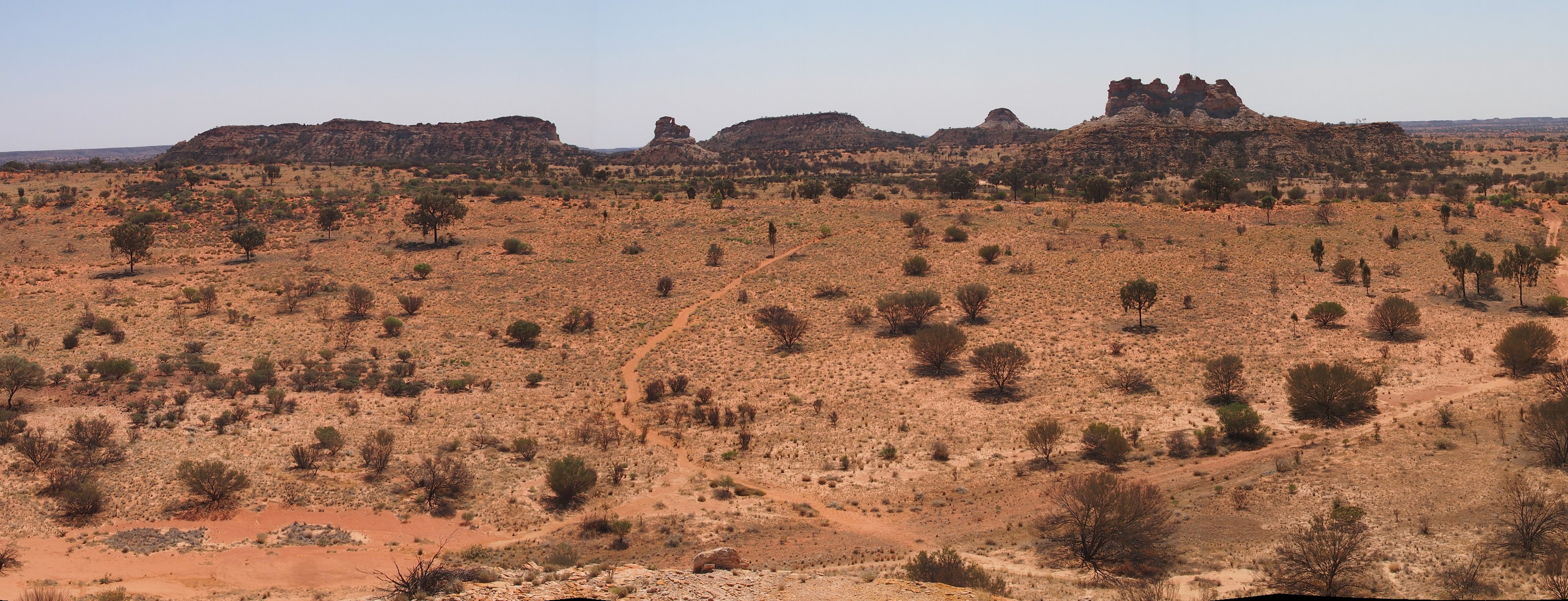
Chambers Pillar and Castle Rock are located within the station

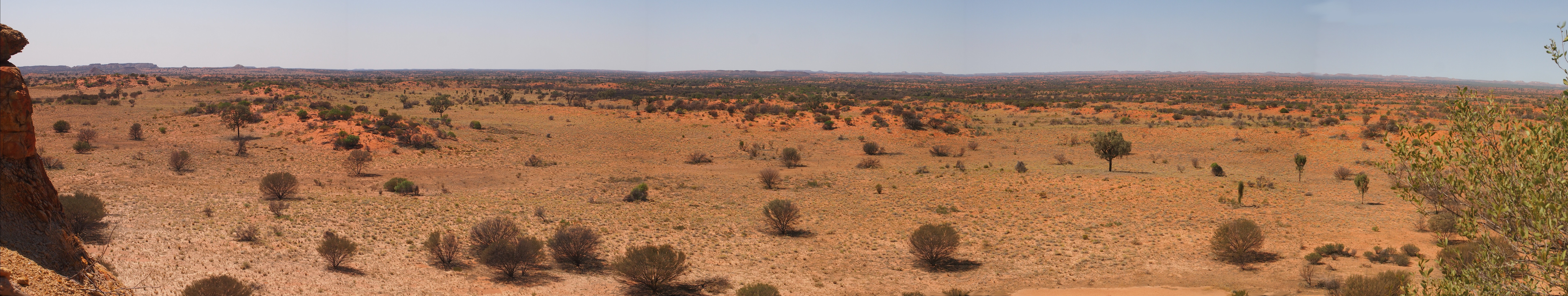
Station landscape from Chambers Pillar

Maryvale Station is a pastoral lease that operates as a cattle station in the Northern Territory of Australia.

It is situated about 107 kilometres (66 mi) south of Alice Springs and 320 kilometres (199 mi) east of Yulara. The ephemeral Finke and the Hugh River both flow through the property but it is still dependent on bores and dams for watering stock. The Indigenous Australian community of Titjikala is situated within the boundaries of the station. The property shares a boundary with Horseshoe Bend Station to the south, Allambi to the east, Deep Well and Orange Creek to the north and with Henbury and Idracowra Stations to the west.

The unusual rock formation, Chambers Pillar is situated within the station boundaries.

The property has an average stocking rate of approximately 6,500 head of cattle. It is equipped with a three bedroom homestead, a four bedroom staff house, workers' quarters, workshop, sheds, cattle yards and is divided into 14 paddocks.

As of 2014 the 3,244-square-kilometre (1,253 sq mi) property was still on the market along with at least 15 others in the Kimberley and Northern Territory. It was bought by Viv Oldfield in April 2018 for A$15 million.

== Early history ==
Maryvale Station is named after Mary Hayes, wife of William Hayes, who owned the station in the early 1900s, along with Owen Springs Station, Mount Burrell Station, Deep Well Station and Undoolya Station.

== See also ==
- List of ranches and stations
