= William Hayes (pastoralist) =

- Born: c. 1827; Liverpool, England
- Died: 17 November 1913; Adelaide, South Australia
- Occupation: Pastoralist
- Spouse: Mary Hayes
- Children: James, William, Mary, John, Elizabeth, Edward

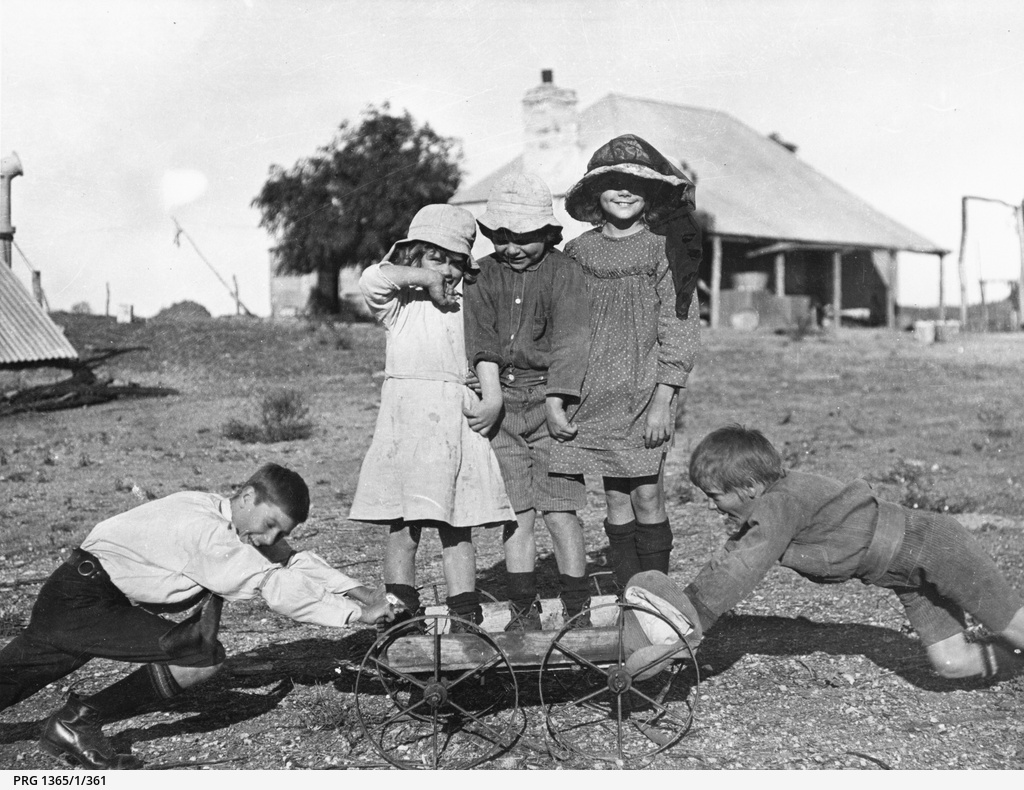
Bob Laver [left] with the Hayes children

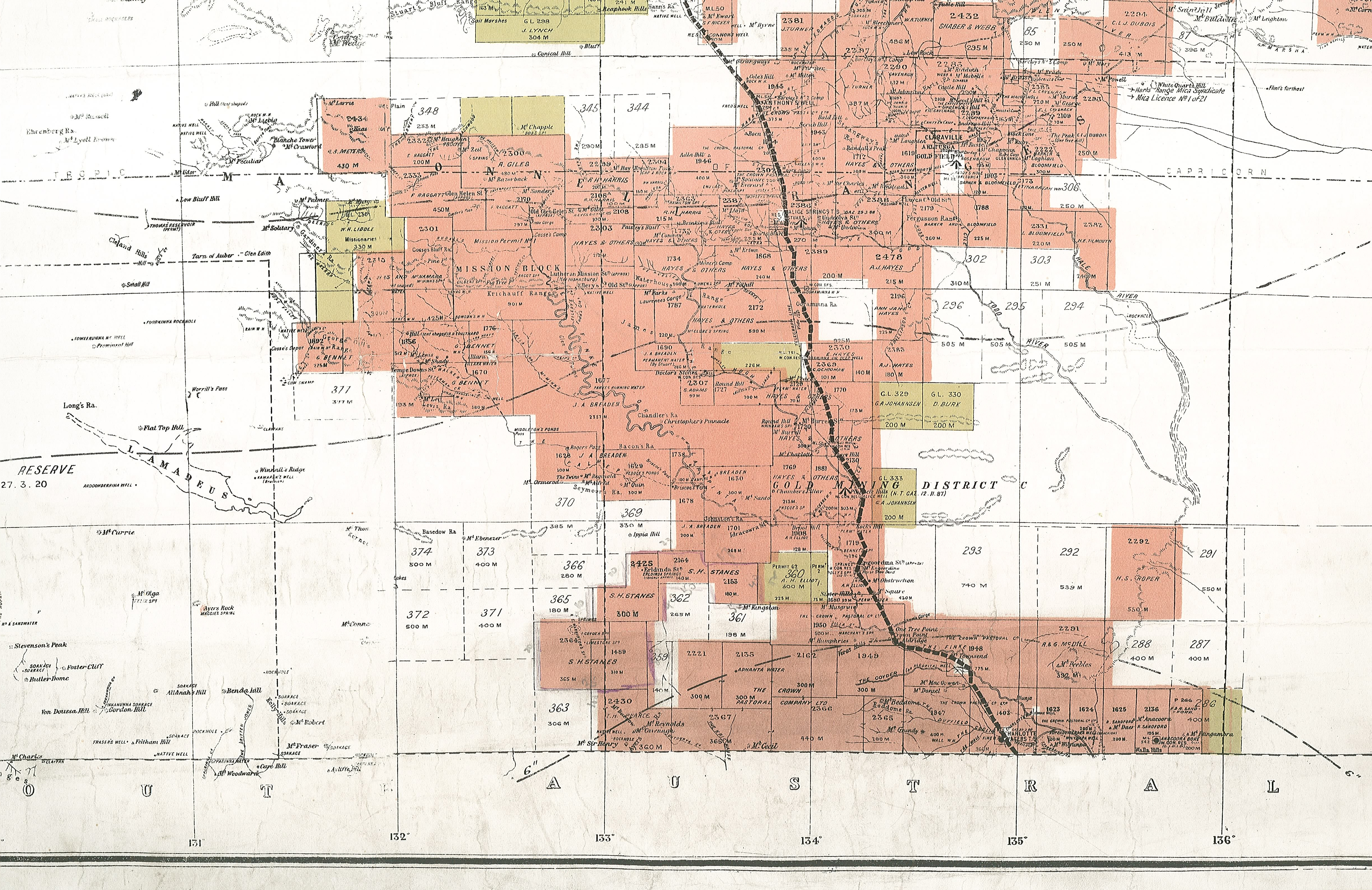
Central Australian pastoral lease owned by Hayes family in 1922.

William P. Hayes (c. 1827 – 17 November 1913) was a pioneer and pastoralist in Central Australia. He is best known for establishing a cattle empire over 13,478 square km of land, including Undoolya, Deep Well, Maryvale, Mount Burrell and Owen Springs Stations near Alice Springs in the Northern Territory of Australia.

== Early life ==
Hayes was born c. 1827 in Liverpool in the United Kingdom and grew up in Wales, where as a young adult he became a butcher.

Hayes migrated to Australia at the age of 21, arriving in Adelaide. He took up work in various locations throughout remote South Australia, including Yednaloo Station, north of Port Augusta and then Canowie. He purchasing a team of bullocks. In the drought of the mid-1860s, he lost all 30 bullocks. Of the wide variety of work he did during this period, it was the "conveyance of five tonnes of copper ore in one lump from Yudanamutpna Mine to Port Augusta for exhibition in London" that he regarded as his finest achievement, as he did it single-handed.

William and his wife Mary (née Stratford) arrived in Alice Springs in 1884 after the birth of their last child Edward. They undertook fencing work on Mount Burrell Station and Owen Springs Station for Thomas Elder. In 1890 they hauled a large consignment of steel telegraph poles to Alice Springs, to replace the original wooden poles of the Overland Telegraph Line.

== Pastoral empire ==
The Hayes applied for a lease on what was to become Deep Well Station in 1893, purchasing 162 cattle from Tom Williams of Paddy's Hole Arltunga. They expanded their holdings during the drought of the 1890s, securing a lease at Mount Burrell upon the withdrawal of Thomas Elder from the region. He was soon to own five others and abandon Deep Well. In 1903, he transferred his seven leases into the name Hayes and Family, his sights next on Undoolya Station. Over the next two decades the Hayes's holdings continued to expand until they owned more 11,000 cattle over 13,478 square km of land, which was about the same size as land owned by Sidney Kidman's at the time and included:

Station	No. of leases	Size (square km)
Mount Burrell/Maryvale	7	3,753
Undoolya	7	4,908
Owen Springs	6	4,817

William and Mary had six children, James, Edward, Elizabeth, Mary, William and John. William's views on the contribution of women on the station were progressive. In an interview in 1908, Hayes stated:

"I understand you acknowledge your daughters to be as good as yourself on the station?" remarked the reporter.

"I do, indeed," replied Mr. Hayes. "There is no phase of station and bush life that they an unable to tackle. There is nothing of the type of girls who want to drive out on Sundays about them. They are thorough, horsewomen, with or without saddles, and can muster cattle with the best men I ever saw. I bought a couple of new men's saddles for them only yesterday." "Can they shoe a horse?"— "Of course they can shoe a horse. That's easy."

"Can they brand cattle?"— "Yes: and shoot and dress a beast when the beef has run out They also break in colts, and go out for a week or two at a time with a couple of lubras mustering cattle. They think nothing of camping under the stars, and, in fact, can do anything with stock that men can do. I can tell you that if they were the bosses of a station things would have to be carried out their way."

In 1911, their holdings at Undoolya Station were threatened by an inquiry by the Commonwealth Department of External Affairs into the development of a horse breeding station in Central Australia, to meet a contract with the Indian Army to supply them with over 4,000 horses annually. The Undoolya leases were identified as a potential location since they were up for renewal in September 1911. After much uncertainty, the Undoolya lease was renewed on 15 September 1921. By then, William Hayes had died in Adelaide on 17 November 1913 aged 86, leaving his holdings remaining with his family.
