= Undoolya Station =

Pastoral lease in the Northern Territory

Coordinates: 23.694287°S 134.035119°E

Location in the Northern Territory

Undoolya Station is a 1,440 square kilometres (556 sq mi) pastoral lease 9 kilometres (5.6 mi) east of Alice Springs (Mparntwe) in the Northern Territory of Australia.

It was one of the first two pastoral leases granted in the region with the lease for it, and Owen Springs Station, being granted on 1 April 1872; five months before the completion of the Overland Telegraph Line.

It has been managed by the Hayes Family since 1906 and t is currently managed by Ben and Nicole Hayes.

== Early history ==
The Central Arrernte people have lived on Undoolya Station and the surrounding region for thousands of years.

Undoolya Station was established by South Australian pastoralist and stock agent Edward Mead Bagot. After working the southern section of the Overland Telegraph Line, Bagot applied for two leases adjoining the Alice Springs Telegraph Station in 1872. His friend Joseph Gilbert also applied for two blocks, closer to where Owen Springs Station is today.

Bagot's son Ted, Churchill Smith and Joseph Gilbert's son William, selected cattle on Gilbert's Pewsey Vale Station to stock the new Central Australian leases. They undertook the first large cattle drove from South Australia to Alice Springs in June. It is considered to be one of the great droving feats in Australia history, during which they met Charles Todd returning from his first inspection of the southern end of the Overland Telegraph Line, as well as well-known explorers Ernest Giles, Peter Warburton and William Gosse.

When they arrived in March 1873 with the cattle they first camped at Emily Gap (Anthwerrke), which was designed to be a temporary camp, until construction of a homestead began in 1873 near to Mount Undoolya. In doing so they did not realise that they were camping at a very sacred site, connected with Caterpillar Dreaming, for the Arrernte people. Stuart Traynor says that:

The men had no concept of Aboriginal spirituality or any inkling that what they had done was akin to taking livestock inside a cathedral.

— Stuart Traynor, Alice Springs: from singing wire to iconic outback town (2016)

Undoolya was purchased by William Hayes and his wife Mary in 1906. In 1911, the Commonwealth Department of External Affairs stated the need for a horse breeding station, to meet a contract with the Indian Army to supply them with over 4000 horses annually. The Undoolya leases were identified as a potential location since they were up for renewal in September 1911. After much uncertainty, the leases were signed and delivered to the Hayes family on 15 September 1921. By then William Hayes had died, so his son Edward Hayes became general manager and moved from Maryvale Station to Undoolya with his wife Ann.

According to the artist, Rex Battarbee, Ann Hayes had

"no time for the natives and says she would like to put them all in the Alice Springs jail and burn them...she would gladly put a match to them"

In 1930 the family company was dissolved and the Hayes family properties were put up for auction in 1930. He purchased Undoolya and sold Maryvale and Owen Springs. After serious drought conditions, Hayes realised the need for dams and developed the infrastructure on Undoolya. He also introduced Poll Herefords to the station, the first to bring them to Central Australia. By 1935 he had grown the station to 2000 cattle, 150 horses and 400 goats.

In 1950, Edward Hayes sold the station to his son Edward Junior, better known as Ted (-1988) and his wife Jean. In 1960 Ted purchased Deep Well Station. He was forced to move all his cattle to Undoolya Station in 1964 to 1965 due to drought, abandoning Deep Well. All staff relocated to Undoolya also. Despite challenging climatic conditions, Ted doubled the capacity of Undoolya over the last 30 years of his life, leaving the station to his wife and sons. The station remains in the family and is currently run by Ben and Nicole Hayes.

== Current use ==
=== Cattle ===
The Hayes continue to run Poll Hereford cattle on the property. It is European Union-accredited and has been part of a Meat Standards Australia grading program since 2009. They predominately supply cattle to T&R Pastoral abattoir at Murray Bridge or Victorian feedlots.

=== Horticulture ===
The Hayes Family cleared part of the station in 2002 to establish Rocky Hill Table Grapes. They now have 60,000 white grape vines over 60 hectares (148 acres). They have also grown lucerne, onions, cabbages and other vegetables. Rocky Hill was granted an increased water extraction license in 2015, causing concern among some local residents and environmental groups.

In 2022 it celebrated its 150th anniversary.

== Gallery ==
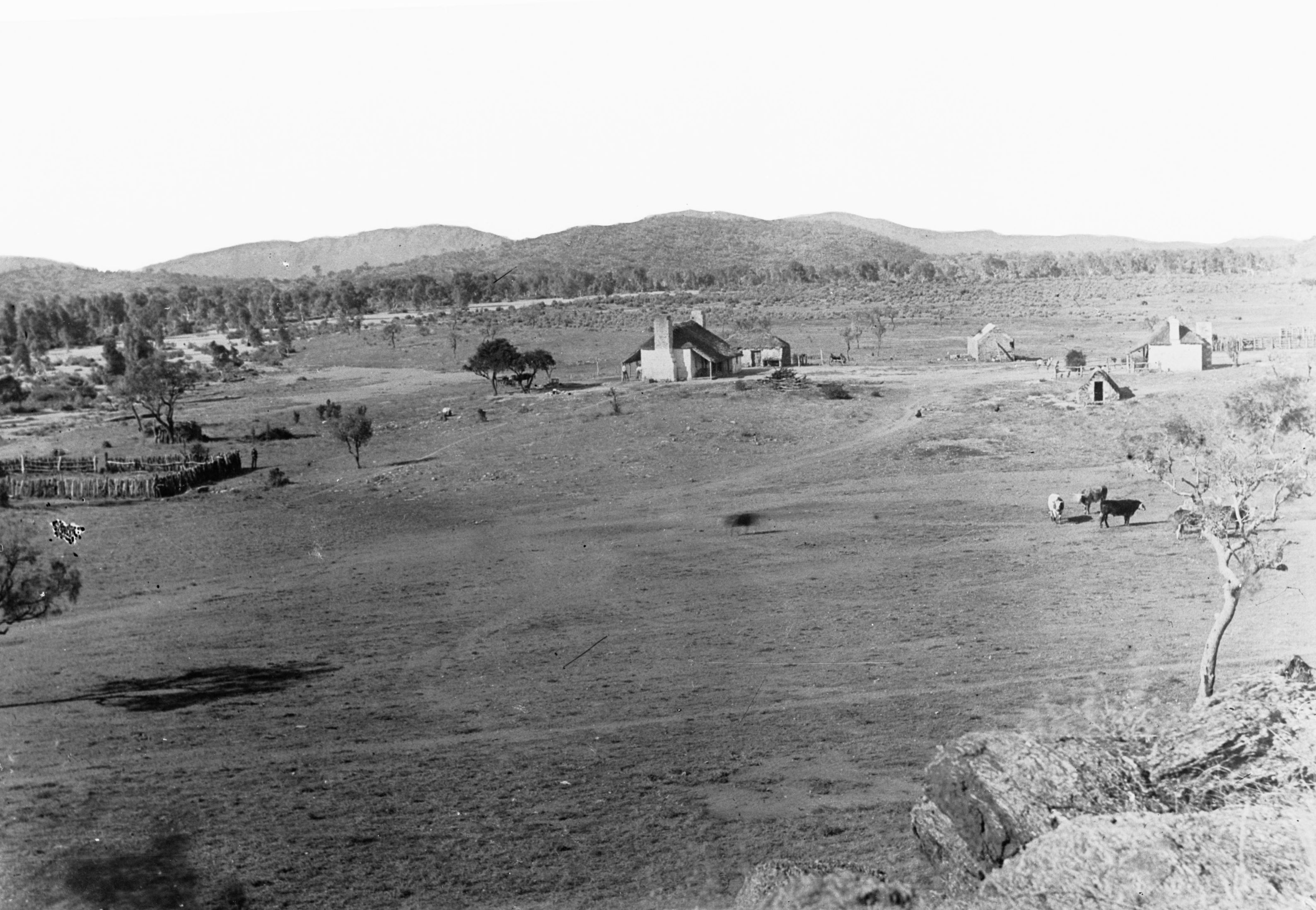
Undoolya Station, ca. 1905

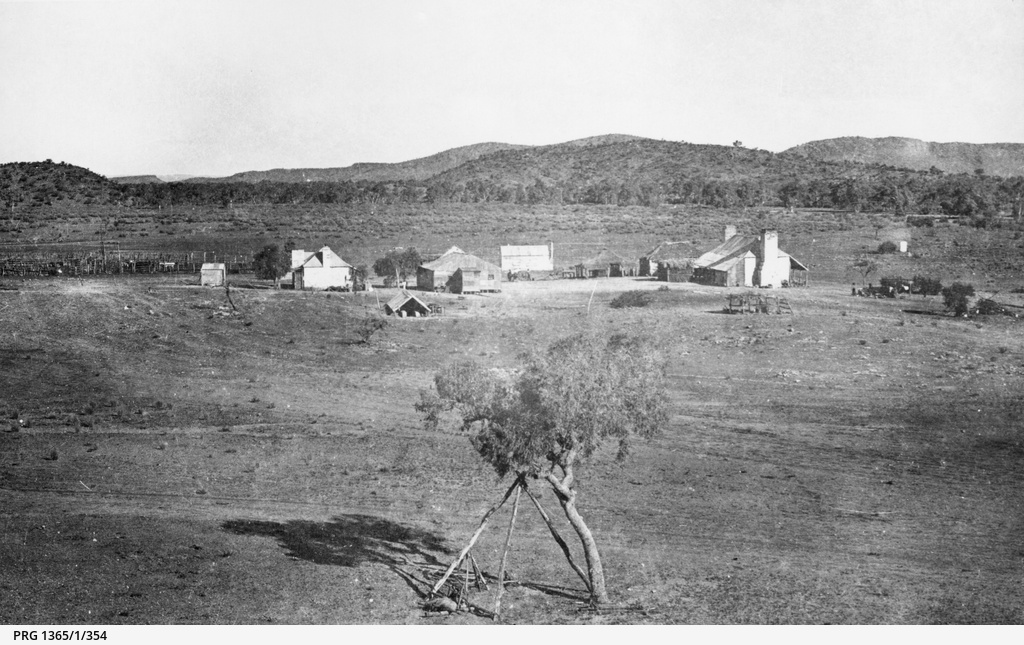
Undoolya Station, looking south, in 1922

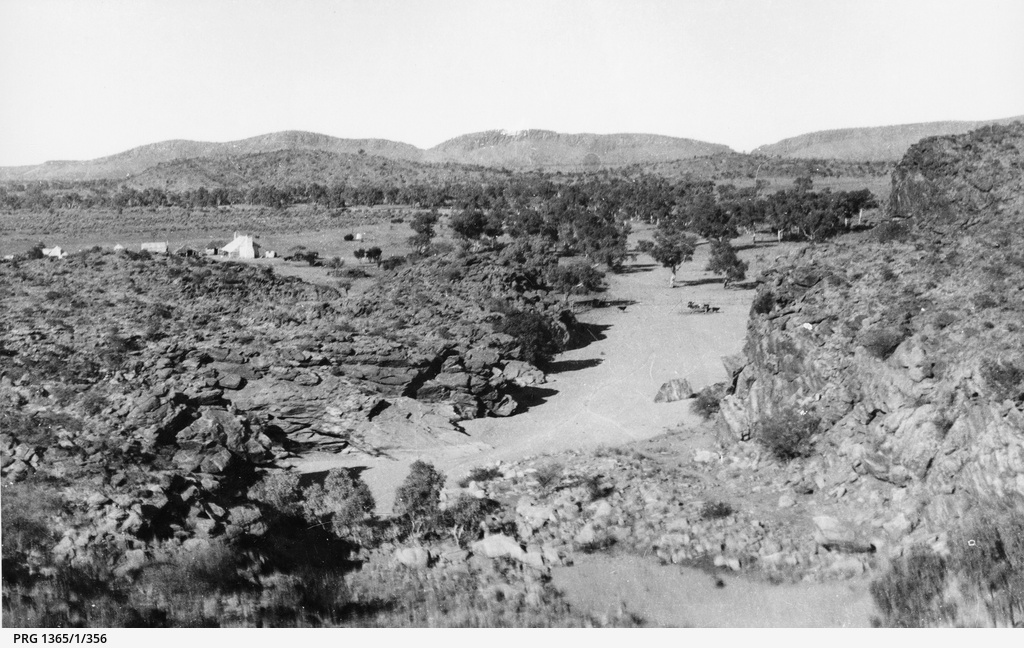
Undoolya Station in 1922 showing Undoolya Creek

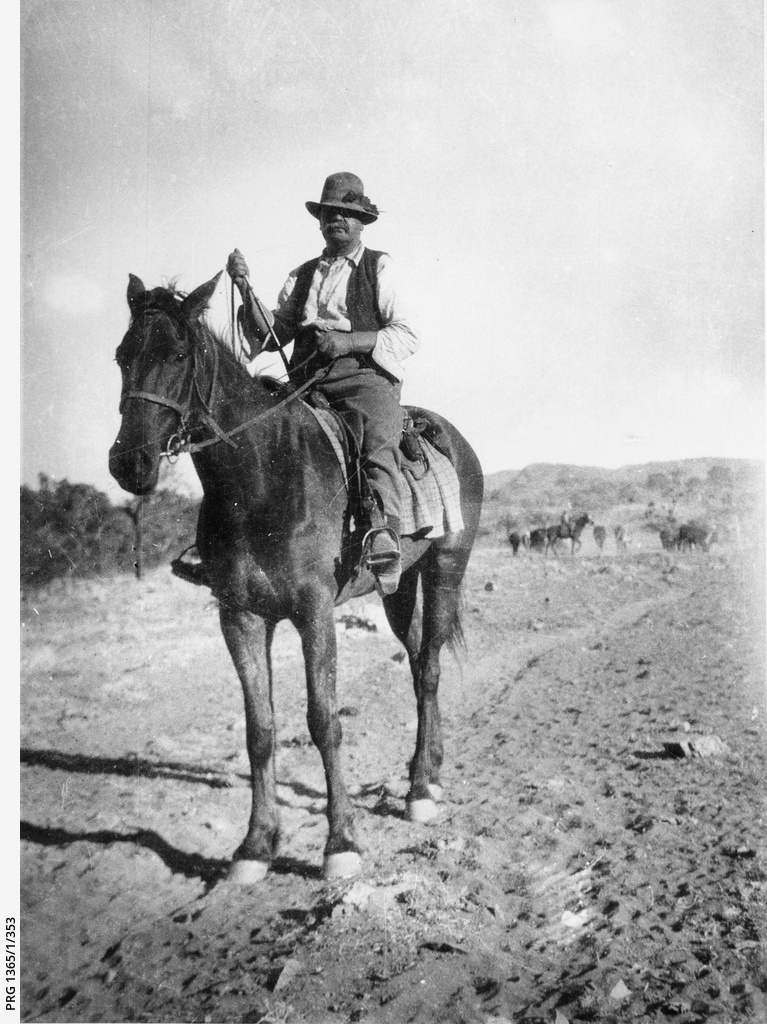
Edward (Ted) Hayes in 1922

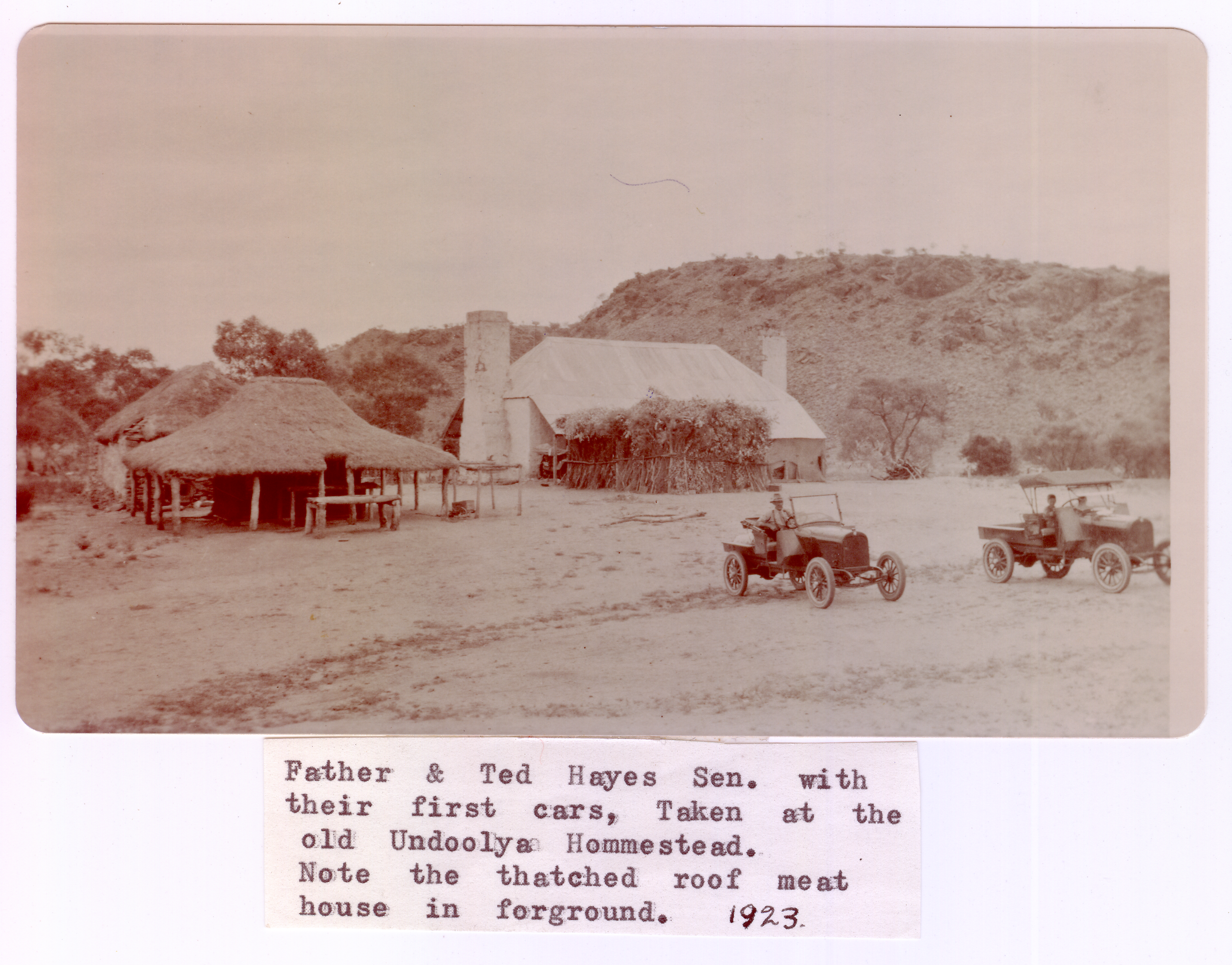
Gerhardt Johannsen and Ted Hayes Senior with their first cars at the Undoolya Station homestead, 1923

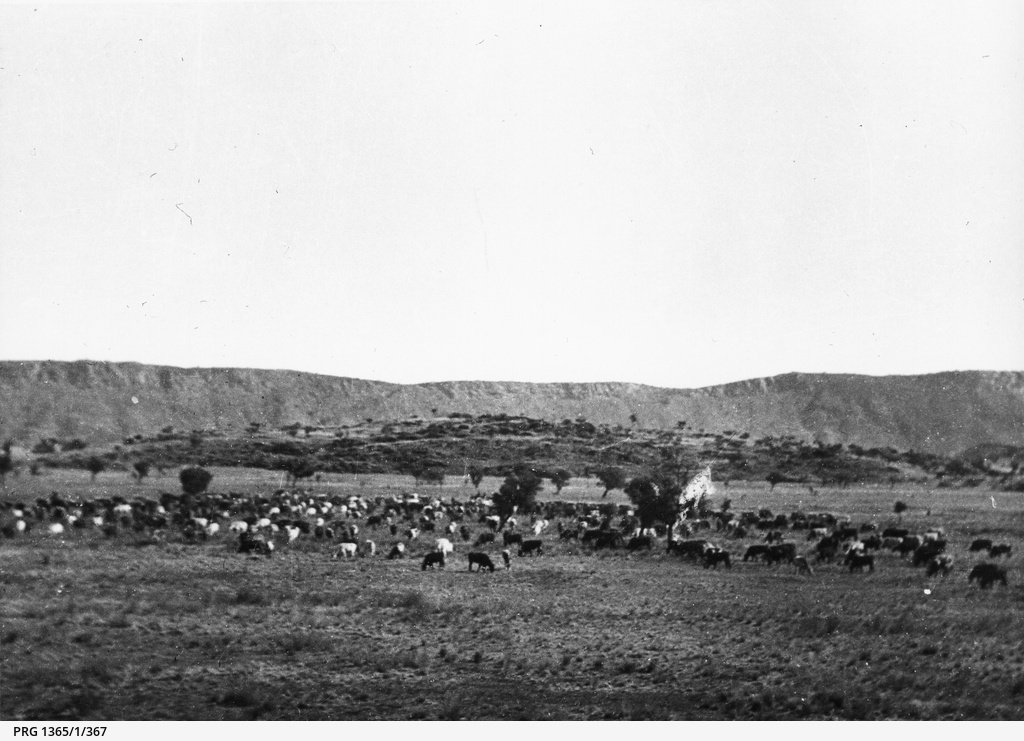
Cattle grazing on Undoolya Station in 1924

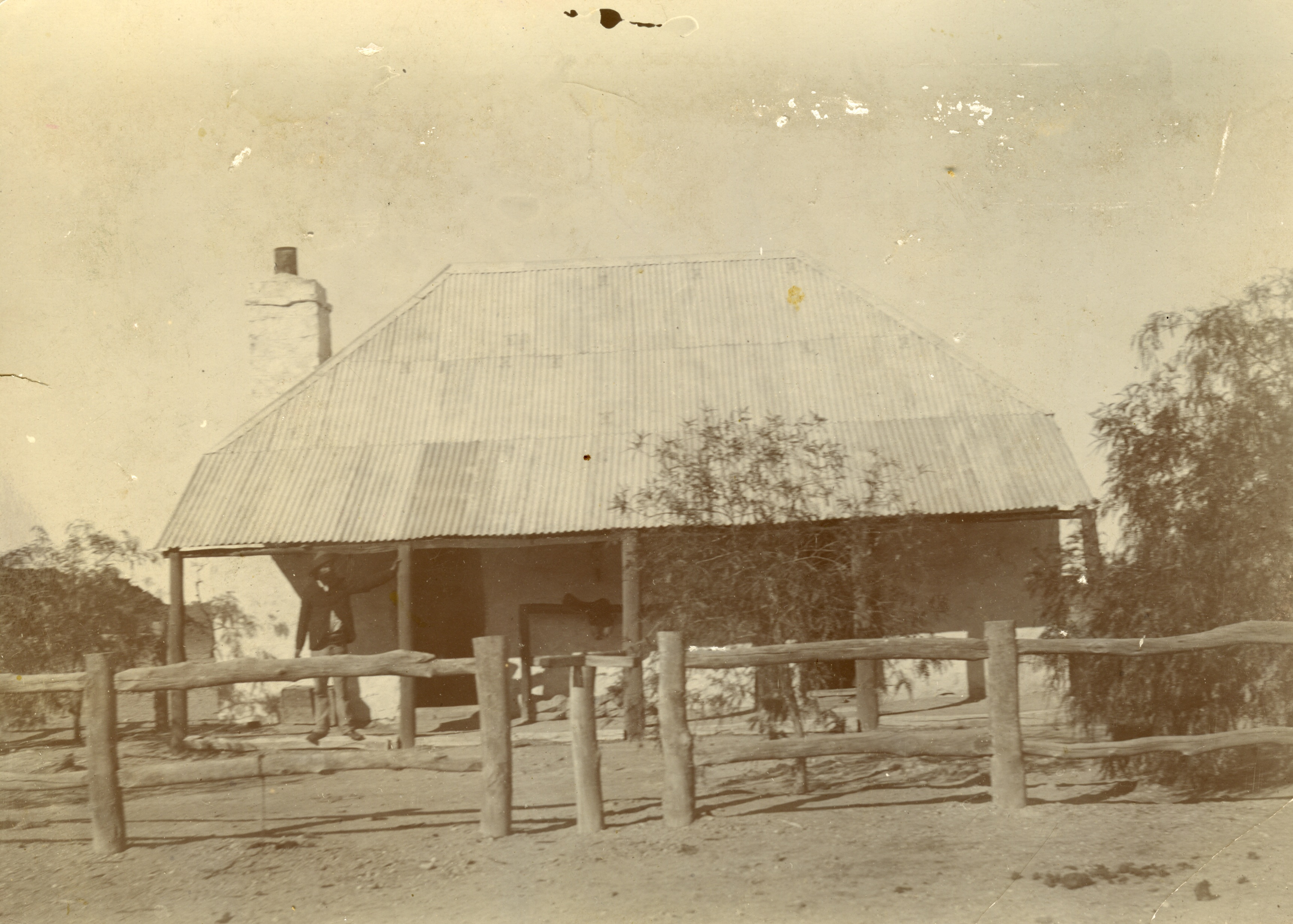
Manager's House, Undoolya Station, date unknown

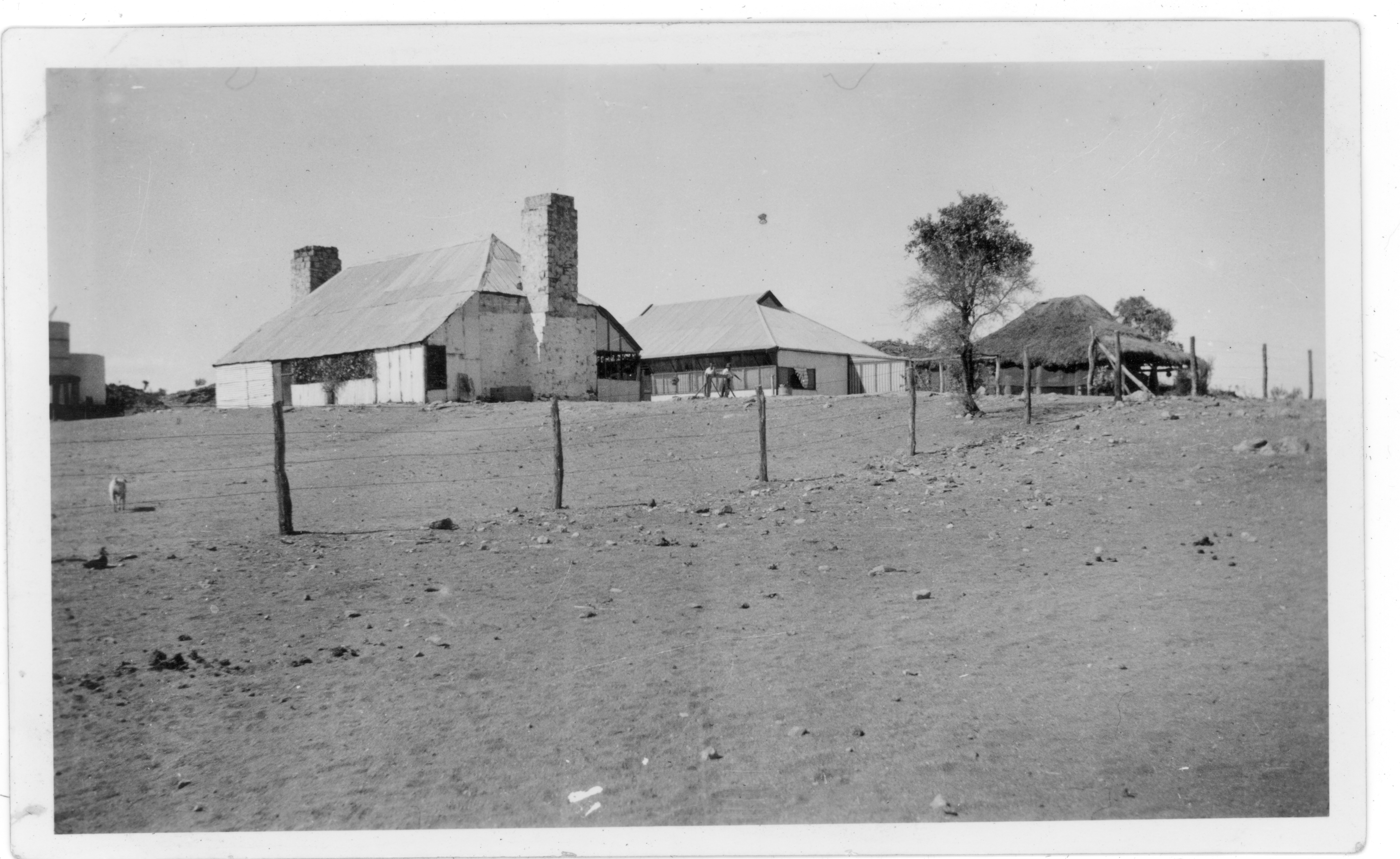
Undoolya Station in 1937-1938

== See also ==
- List of ranches and stations
