= Deep Well Station =

Pastoral lease in the Northern Territory

Coordinates: 24.2987°S 134.1444°E

Location in the Northern Territory

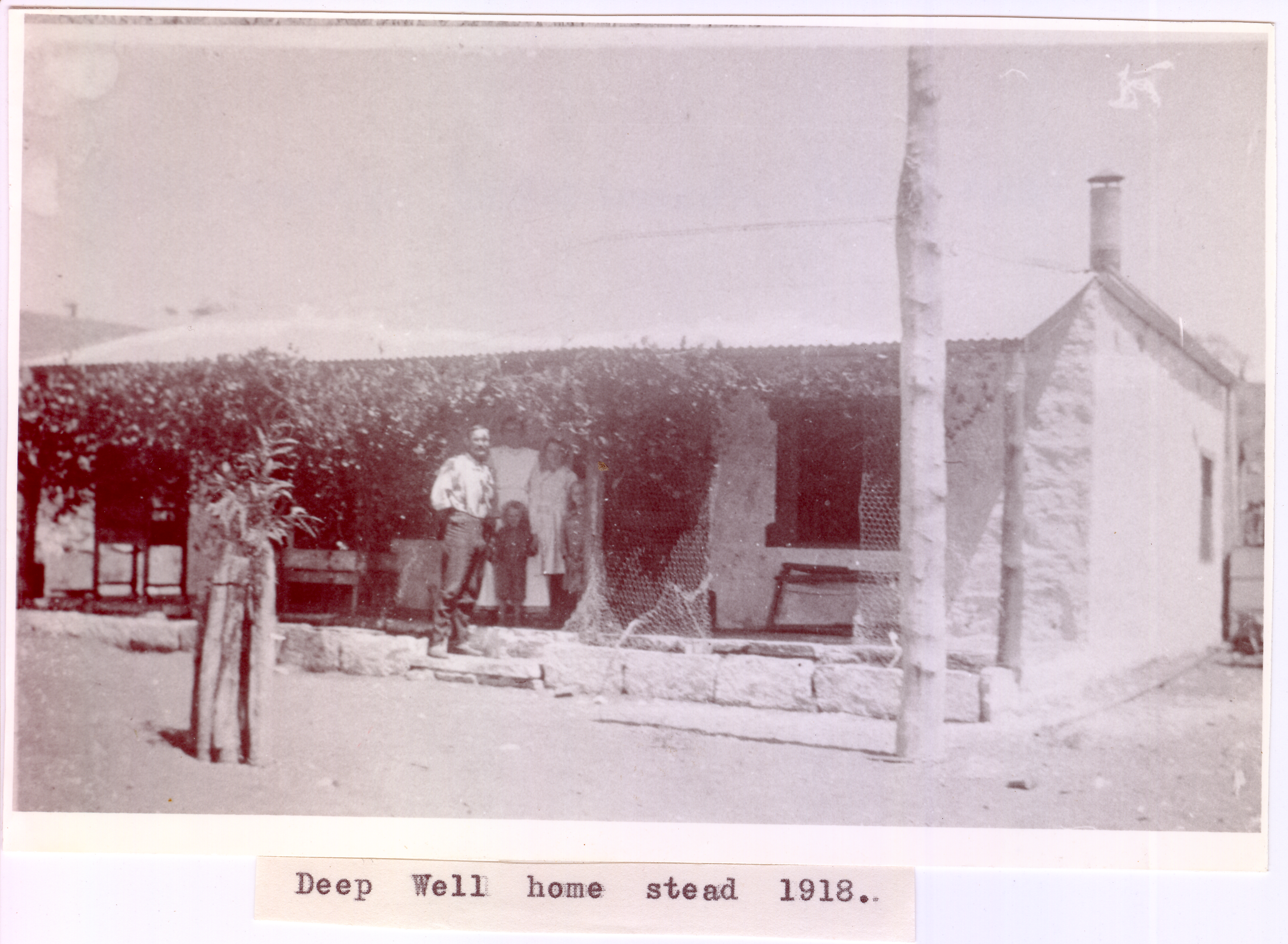
Deep Well Station homestead in 1918

Cattle muster at Deep Well, c. 1920s

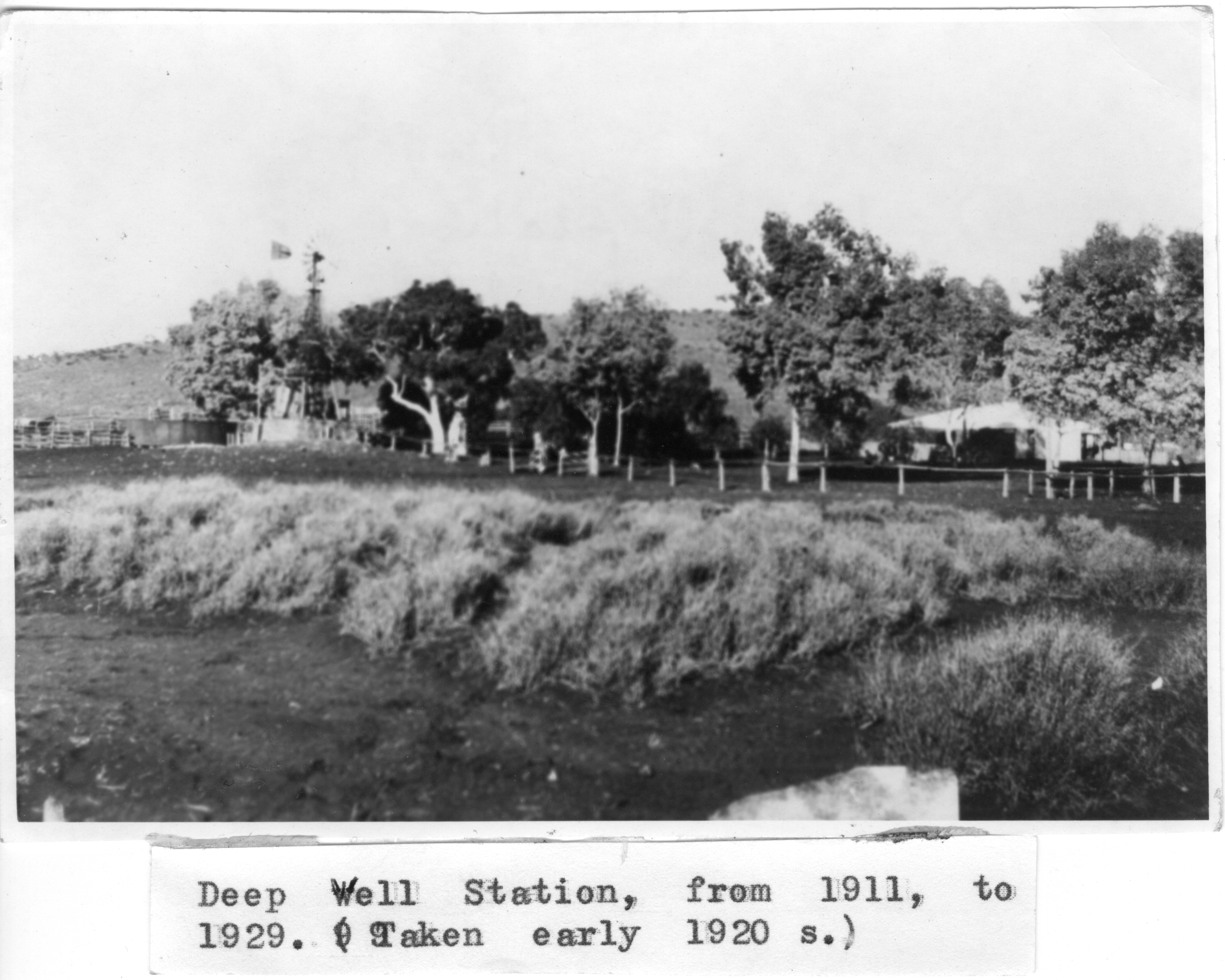
The Deep Well homestead in the 1920s

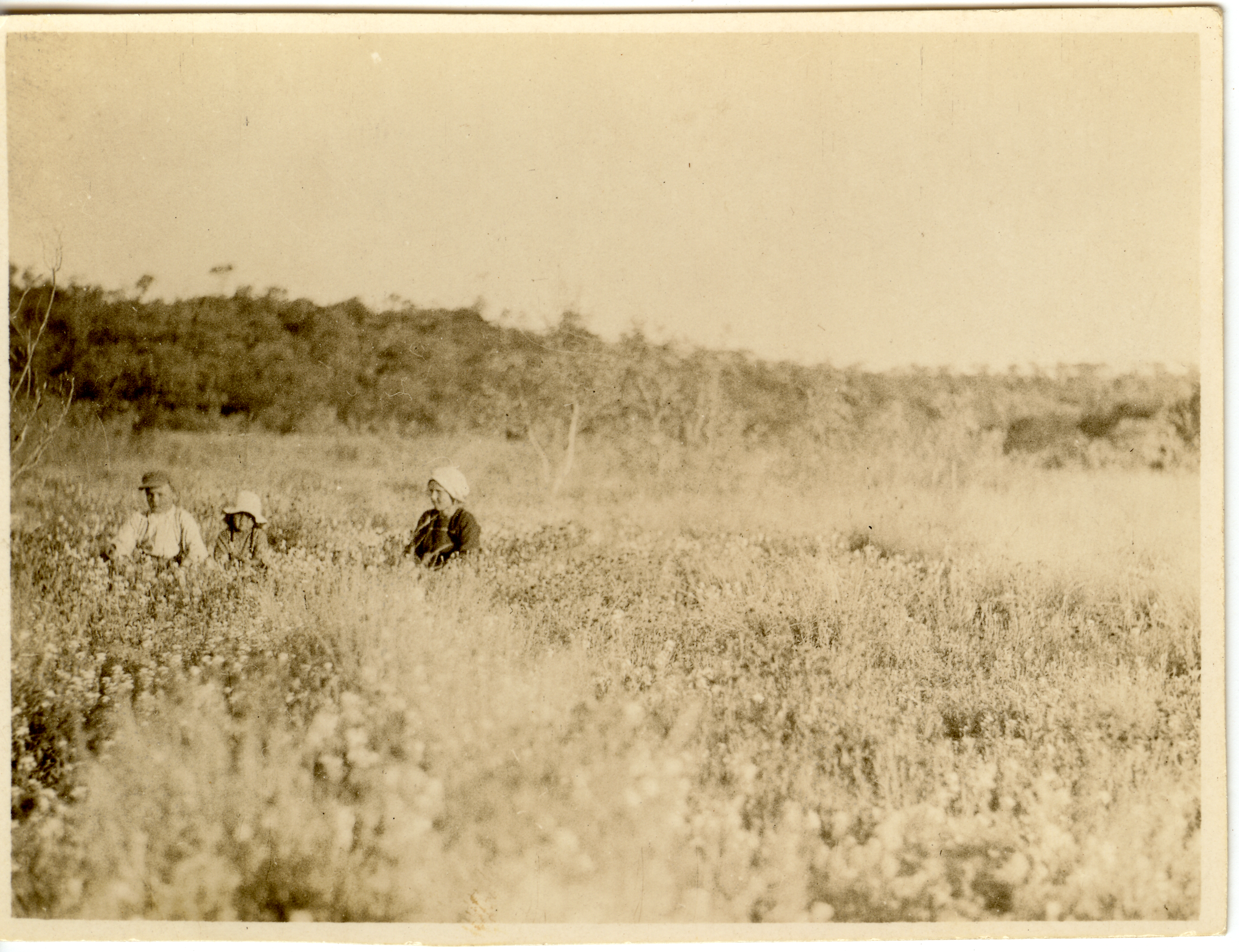
Kurt and Trudy (later Hayes) Johannsen with Emily in a patch of wildflowers at Deep Well Station in the 1920s

Deep Well Station is a pastoral lease that operates as a cattle station in the Northern Territory of Australia.

== Description ==
It is situated about 60 kilometres (37 mi) south south east of Alice Springs and 60 kilometres (37 mi) east of the Stuart Highway in the Northern Territory, just off the Phillipson stock route. Lying between the MacDonnell Ranges and the Simpson Desert and taking in much of the Ooraminna Ranges, the property is composed of a variety of land types including red sand hills, rocky outcrops and spinifex plains. Deep Well is just east of the former Central Australia Railway, which had a stop also called Deep Well.

== History ==
William Hayes and his wife Mary arrived in Alice Springs in 1884 with steel telegraph poles to replace the original wooden ones used to build the Overland Telegraph. They also worked on other properties in the area such as Mount Burrell and Owen Springs Station. The Hayes established the property in the late 1880s and it has remained in the Hayes family ever since. Billy Hayes, the fifth generation of the Hayes family, was inducted into the Stockman's Hall of Fame in 2009. Hayes was the hero in Turbulence, the bush poem written by Murray Hartin.

A drought from 1964 to 1965 resulted in Ted Hayes moving all the stock to Undoolya Station and temporarily leaving Deep Well abandoned. All the Aboriginal workers also left the property and set up camp at Undoolya as well.

During the early 1990s the area was struck by drought once more and had large debts. Some 5,000 cattle had been grazing at Deep Well up until the drought started. The Hayeses decided to diversify into tourism and built a lodge on the northern side of the station at Ooraminna. Shortly afterwards Ted Egan approached the family asked if he could build a movie set in the same location for a film version of his song The Drover's Boy. The film did not progress but the replica buildings of Newcastle Waters from 1921 remain at Ooraminna and are used for tourist accommodation.

The property was again struck by drought starting in 2002, with Billy Hayes destocking the property in 2006 when the last of the dams dried up.

Billy Hayes died in 2011 died in a quad bike accident at the property. Following the death of her husband Jan Hayes placed the property on the market in 2013 with their son Billy Hayes Junior taking on the management of the property. As of 2014 the 1,641-square-kilometre (634 sq mi) property was still on the market.

In 2016 Billy Hayes Junior died in a plane crash while mustering on New Crown Station.

== See also ==
- List of ranches and stations
