= Titjikala =

Titjikala (Maryvale)
- Town
- Coordinates: 24°40′23″S 134°4′28″E
- Country: Australia
- State: Northern Territory
- LGA: MacDonnell Region
- Location: 120 km (75 mi) southeast of Alice Springs

Government
  - Territory electorate: Namatjira
  - Federal division: Lingiari
- Elevation: 367 m (1,204 ft)

Population
  - Total: 201 (2011 census)
- Postcode: 0872
- Mean max temp: 37.5 °C (99.5 °F)
- Mean min temp: 5.6 °C (42.1 °F)
- Annual rainfall: 188.8 mm (7.43 in)

Titjikala, also known as Tapatjatjaka and formerly known as "Maryvale" (after the cattle station of the same name) is an Aboriginal community in the south of the Northern Territory of Australia.

At the 2011 census, Titjikala had a population of 201.

== Geography ==
The traditional owners of the Titjikala area were custodians of an area extending from Horseshoe Bend through to Chambers Pillar, the Titjikala community area, and then across to Mount Burrell, Mount Peachy, and to Mount Frank.

Titjakala is about 100 km (62 mi) by mainly unsealed road south-east from Alice Springs, which is the main access road to the community. Titjikala is situated in the Simpson Desert, which occupies much of the southern portion of the Northern Territory. It is situated within the boundaries of Maryvale Station, a cattle station.

Chambers Pillar is a spectacular landmark, a multi-coloured rock column some 40 km (25 mi) away from the site.

== Climate ==
No specific weather records are kept for Titjikala. The nearest weather station was located to the southeast at Finke (Aputula) from 1932 to 1980, when it was decommissioned.

Finke experienced summer maximum temperatures of an average of 37.5 degrees Celsius in January and a winter maximum average temperature of 19.9 degrees Celsius in July. Overnight lows range from a mean minimum temperature of 22.8 degrees in January to 5.6 degrees in July. Annual rainfall averages 188.8 millimetres.

== Population ==
The Australian Bureau of Statistics recorded a population of 201 people (with 94% being of Aboriginal background) in the 2011 Census. That represented a decrease since the 2006 census from 219 people. 26.1% of the residents were below 15 years of age, and 2% aged over 65 years of age. Median weekly income was $276, some $70–80 more than other Aboriginal communities but still far short of larger white settlements.

Tapatjatjaka Community, on their website, stated in 2007:

There are also people who have been living in the Titjikala area for several generations, but whose family members came from other areas. Their children, having been born in this area, are connected to its dreaming. Consequently, Titjikala has become the home to Arrernte (traditional owners), Luritja and Pitjantjatjara people.

The above demonstrates the natural interconnection between language and cultural identity in Indigenous Australian culture.

== Languages ==
Traditional languages are Luritja, Arrernte, and Pitjantjatjara. Arrernte is said to be the language of the traditional owners of the land. English is spoken in varying degrees of fluency.

== History ==
Tapatjatjaka Community, on their website, gives the following history:

From the 1940s onwards families came to the Maryvale Station to work as stockmen and as domestic helpers. The station owners provided rations to the people who resided and worked on their stations.

Aboriginal people started settling in the area in the 1950s, when a mission truck visited every six weeks. Families would work at the surrounding stations as stockman, cameleers and domestic staff.

At this time the people still lived in traditional humpies. Water was fetched from a well mainly by donkey wagons, but also by foot or by camel. Children and women would travel back and forwards most of the day collecting water from the well and carrying it to the humpy area. The community obtained its food from rations from the station (flour, salt and meat). People also collected bush tucker including goannas, kangaroos, witchetty grubs, bush tomatoes and bush bananas.

Then in the early 1960s the community built their own sheds, much like garages, with concrete slabs for flooring. At this time the station laid piping from a good bore with the help of the Aboriginal people to provide a tap near the new buildings. As part of the village a church was built in the same garage style.

In the 1970s the first school was provided to the Titjikala people.

The community was originally a 200-hectare (490-acre) excision from the Francis Well water reserve and the stock route. It is within the Maryvale Station pastoral lease, which was registered in 1978.

Titjikala community obtained freehold title to the excision in 1987 and in 1988 the Northern Territory Government gazetted the Titjikala control Plan, which places certain restrictions on land usage and development in the community.

Titjikala was visited on 28 June 2007 by one of the Howard Commonwealth Government's "scoping teams" (comprising federal bureaucrats, social / health workers, police and soldiers), sent to enforce a "crackdown" on sexual abuse in Aboriginal communities. Commonwealth Minister for Aboriginal Affairs, Mal Brough said that the Government's "crackdown" on sexual abuse in Aboriginal communities would begin with five communities, comprising Titjikala, Mutitjulu, Imanpa, Aputula, and Santa Teresa.

== Transport ==
Access to Titjikala is by road or air. The roads and the airstrip can be washed out during heavy rains.

== Facilities ==
There is an Indigenous art centre, Tapatjatjaka Art and Craft, where paintings and sculptures are produced for sale.

Gunya Titjikala was a tourist resort operated by Gunya Tourism at Titjikala. ("Gunya" is another word for "humpy" or shelter.) Profits were delivered to the community through a trust account arrangement. Gunya Titjikala is unique in being funded through a private loan by Macquarie Bank executive Bill Moss, who provided $400,000 to start operations. The Indigenous Land Council contributed $250,000 in venture capital in 2006. The Australian newspaper reported on 9 October 2007 that Gunya had suspended operations due to the cancellation of the Community Development Employment Program as part of the Howard Government's Northern Territory National Emergency Response interventions in the Northern Territory.

Titjikala has a general store, school, women's centre, early learning centre, aged care program, laundry, mechanical workshop, basketball court, health clinic and Centrelink agent.

A primary school exists at Titjikala.

Titjikala and its surrounds are governed by the Tapatjatjaka Community Government Council.

A Lutheran church is based in Titjikala. The Lutheran Church has had a long association with the Titjikala community.

== Notable people ==
- Sally M. Nangala Mulda, artist, born in Titjikala
