= Sally M. Nangala Mulda =

Aboriginal Aboriginal artist

Sally M. Nangala Mulda (born 1957) is an Arrernte and Southern Luritja artist who lives and works in Alice Springs, Northern Territory, Australia. She paints for Tangentyere Artists.

== Life and painting ==
Mulda was born in Titjikala, 130 km from Alice Springs, and went to school in Amoonguna. A childhood accident left Mulda with vision impairment and losing the use of her left arm. Mulda moved to Alice Springs as a young woman and lives at Abbott's Town Camp (see Alice Springs Town Camps).

Mulda began painting early but it was not until she started working with Tangentyere Artists in 2008 that she started painting in what has now become her distinct style; this was assisted by surgery to improve her eyesight.

Mulda is known for her figurative and naive painting style in which she depicts many scenes from around Alice Springs including trees, homes, shops and figures. Equally important to this style is Mulda's addition of cursive script which is unique to her and introduces the paintings subject; all of which are political. Mulda paints about everyday life for Aboriginal people in Alice Springs, especially those living in town camps, and shows their gritty reality. A particular focus of her work is interactions between Aboriginal people and police and especially in relation to alcohol. Following the Intervention in 2007, it was illegal to buy and consume alcohol if you live in an Aboriginal community or a town camp; despite this it is easier to purchase alcohol when living in a town camp than more remotely and this has led to significant overcrowding in town camps and an increased police presence.

== Achievements ==
Mulda's work appears in major institution collections and in private collections and she has been a part of many major exhibitions; she has also:

- Finalist in the National Aboriginal & Torres Strait Islander Art Award in 2012, 2018 and 2019.
- Two solo exhibitions at Alice Springs' Raft Art Space, 2016 and 2020 .
- Featured in The National 2019: New Australian Art exhibition at the Art Gallery of New South Wales.
- Shortlisted for the 2019,2021,2022 Sir John Sulman Prize at the Art Gallery of New South Wales.
- Shortlisted for the 2021 Archibald Prize at the Art Gallery of New South Wales.
- Finalist for Hadley’s Art Prize in 2021.
- Featured in Adelaide's TARNANTHI: Festival of Contemporary Aboriginal and Torres Strait Islander Art in 2019.
- Four solo exhibitions at Brisbane's Edwina Corlette Gallery; 2018, 2019, 2020, 2023
- Mulda is featurted in a travelling exhibition Two Girls from Amoonguna, which began touring in 2023, in this she partnered with Marlene Rubuntja. This exhibition was commissioned by Artbank and ACMI. The centerpiece of this exhibition is the animated work Arrkutja Tharra, Kungka Kutjara, Two Girls which chronicles the artists’ successes and struggles.

== See also ==
- Art of Australia
