= Emily Gap =

Coordinates: 23°44′20″S 133°57′04″E

Emily Gap / Anthwerrke is a natural attraction and significant cultural site to the Arrernte people in the East MacDonnell Ranges, eight kilometres to the east of Mparntwe/Alice Springs, in Australia's Northern Territory. Various sections of the Gap include Aboriginal rock art.

It is a registered sacred site and sits within the Yeperenye / Emily and Jessie Gaps Nature Park.

== History ==
Adjacent to Jessie Gap, Emily Gap is a significant site for the dreaming stories of three ancestral caterpillars, Yeperenye, Utnerrengatye and the Ntyarlke. The caterpillar dreaming is one of the most important creation stories for Mparntwe/Alice Springs and the surrounding region. Many Arrernte people conceived in Alice Springs consider themselves direct descendants of these caterpillars.

From 1 April 1872 Emily Gap became part of the Undoolya Station pastoral lease and, when cattle first arrived as part of an overland droving trip from South Australia in March 1873 they first camped here. In doing so they did not realise or acknowledge that they were camping at a very sacred site and Stuart Traynor says that:

The men had no concept of Aboriginal spirituality or any inkling that what they had done was akin to taking livestock inside a cathedral.

— Stuart Traynor, Alice Springs: from singing wire to iconic outback town (2016)

Emily and Jessie Gaps are apocryphally thought to have been named for the daughters of Charles Todd, however the true basis of the names remain unknown.

== Gallery ==
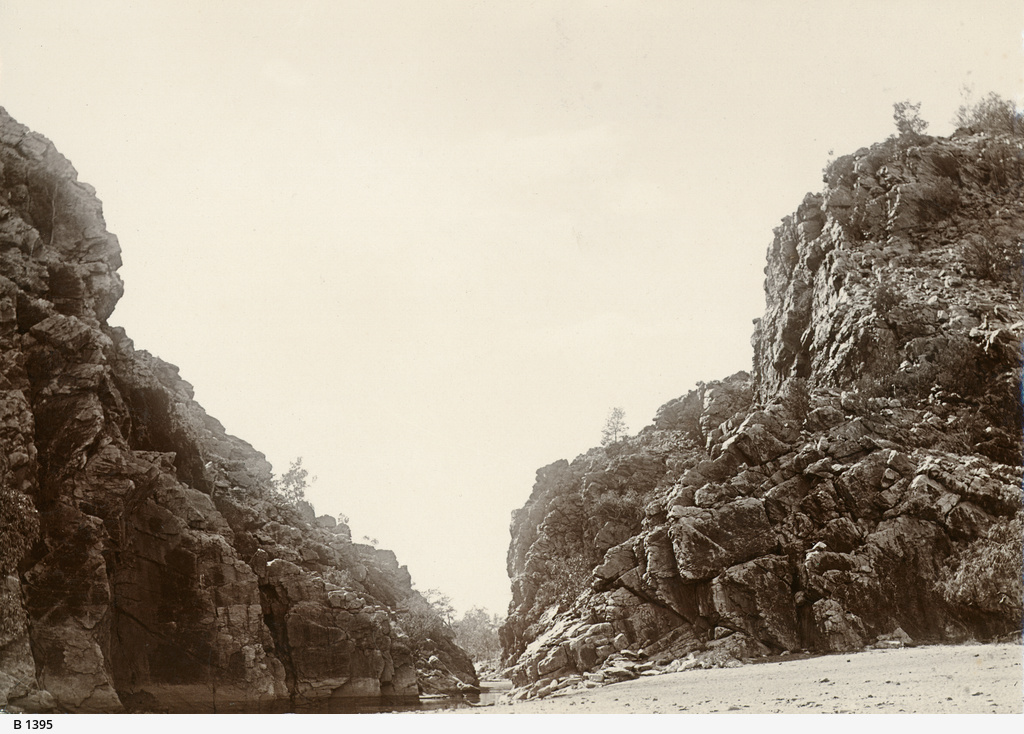
Emily Gap, 1900

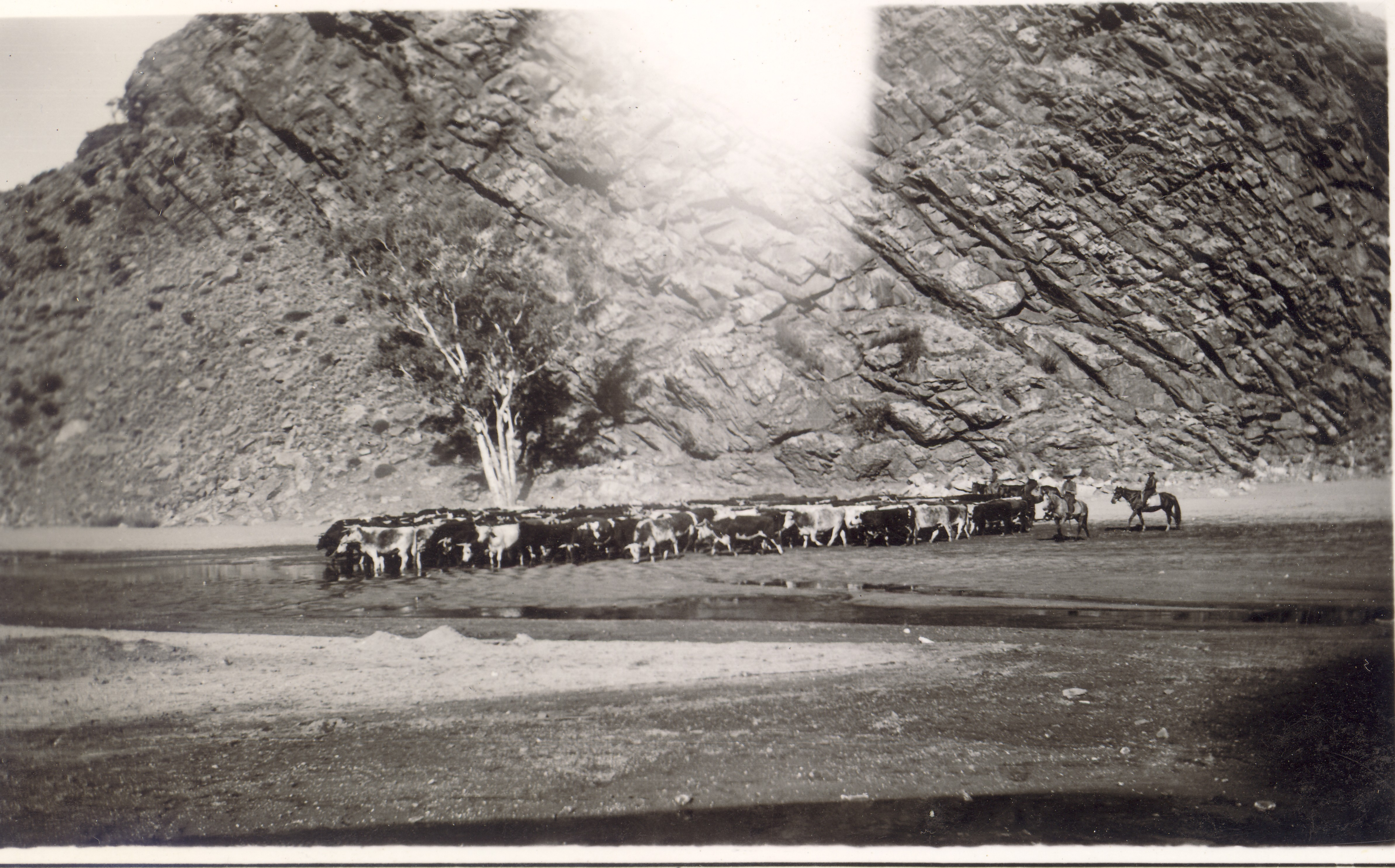
Cattle in Emily Gap, 1938 - 1948

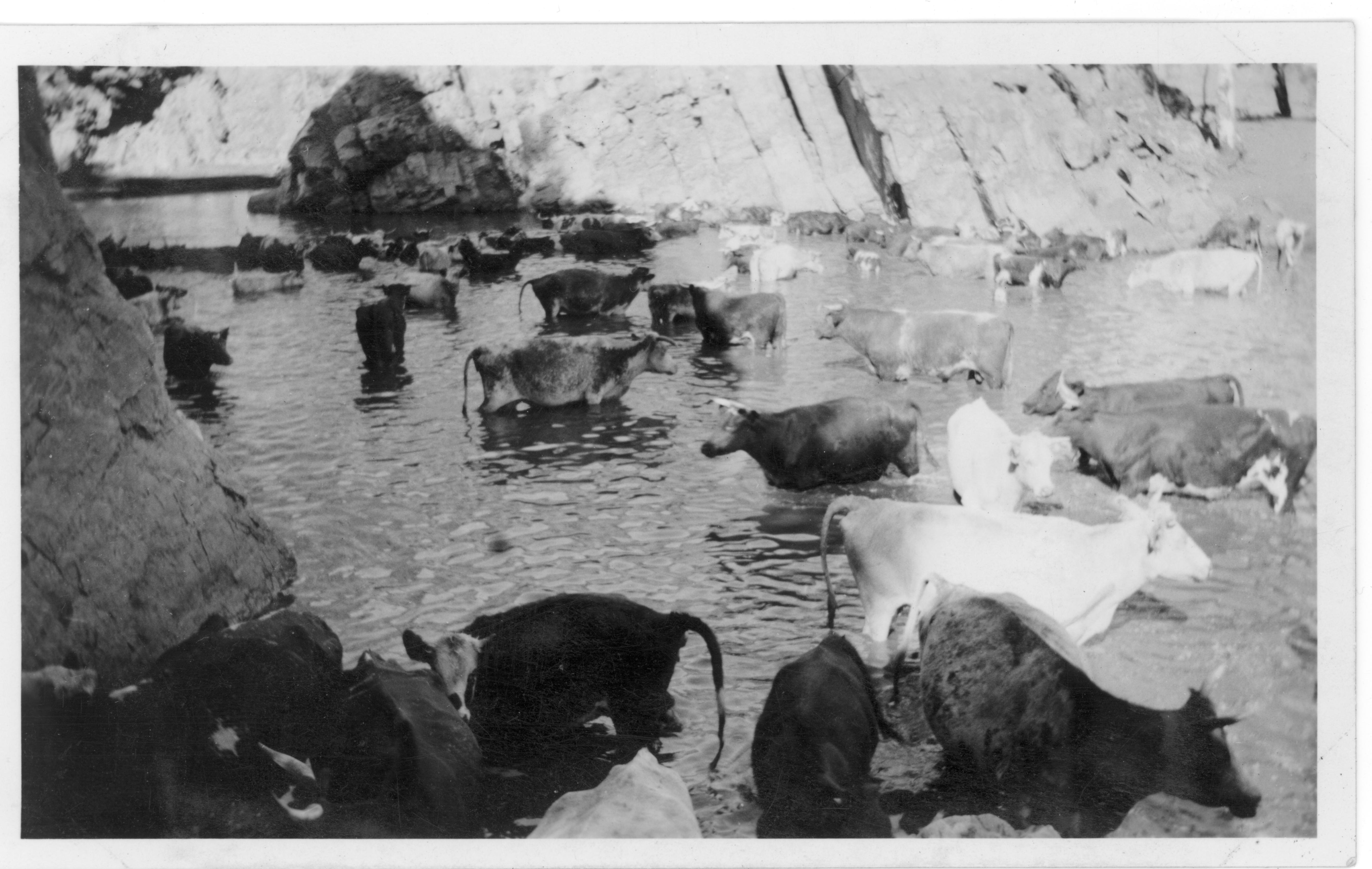
A close up of cattle in the Gap, c1937

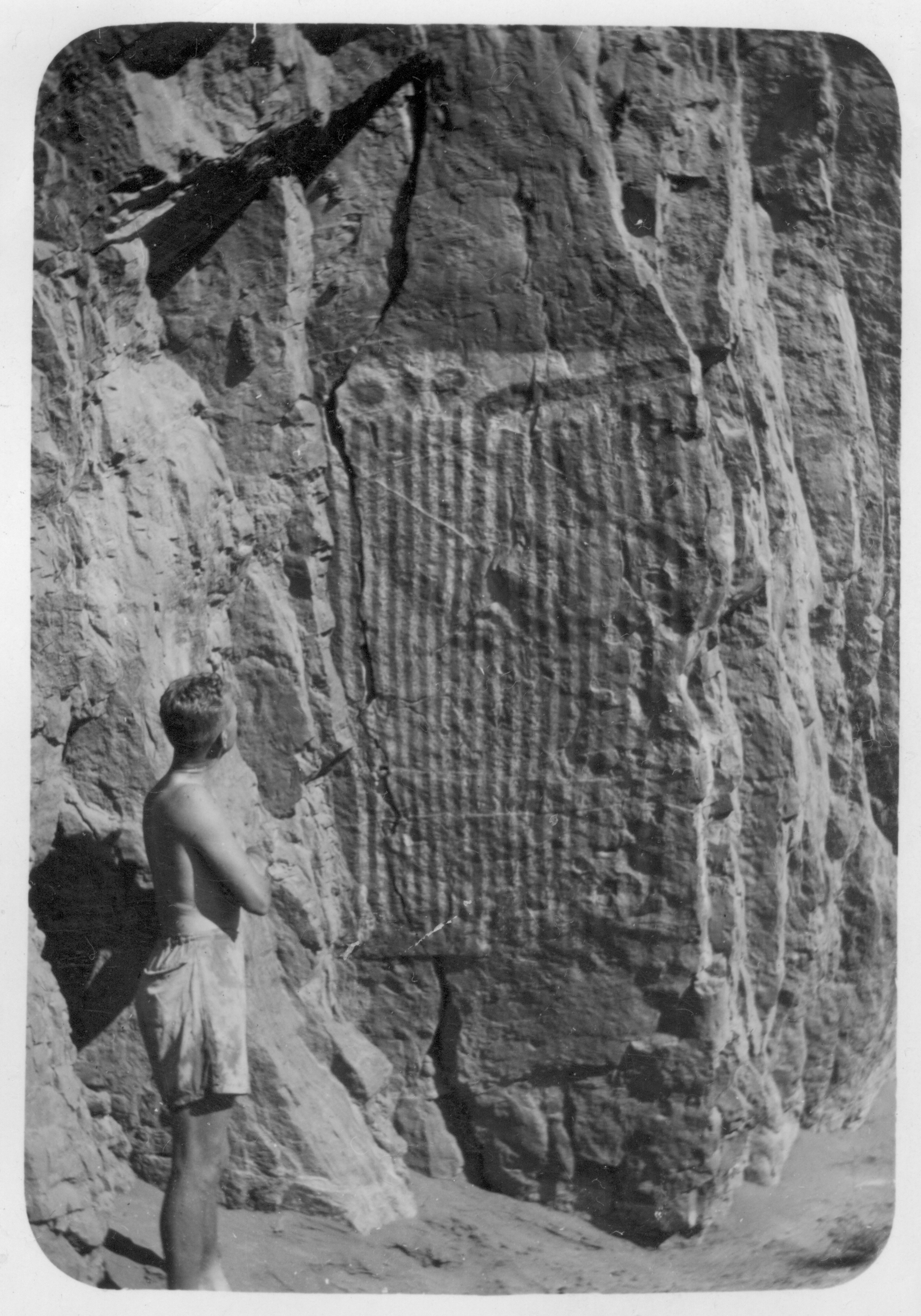
Man looking at rock art in 1941

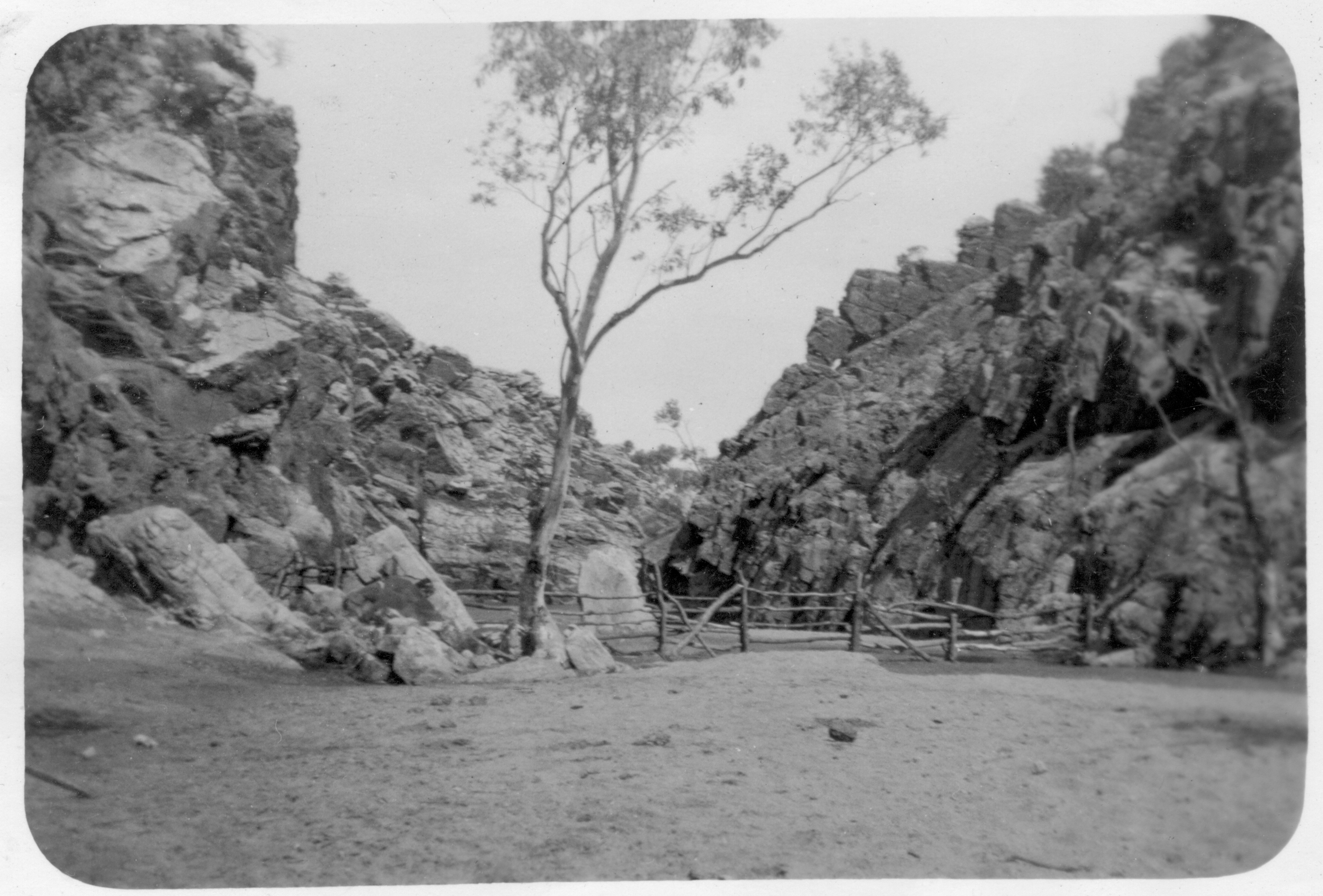
The stock fence on the northern side of the Gap, 1941

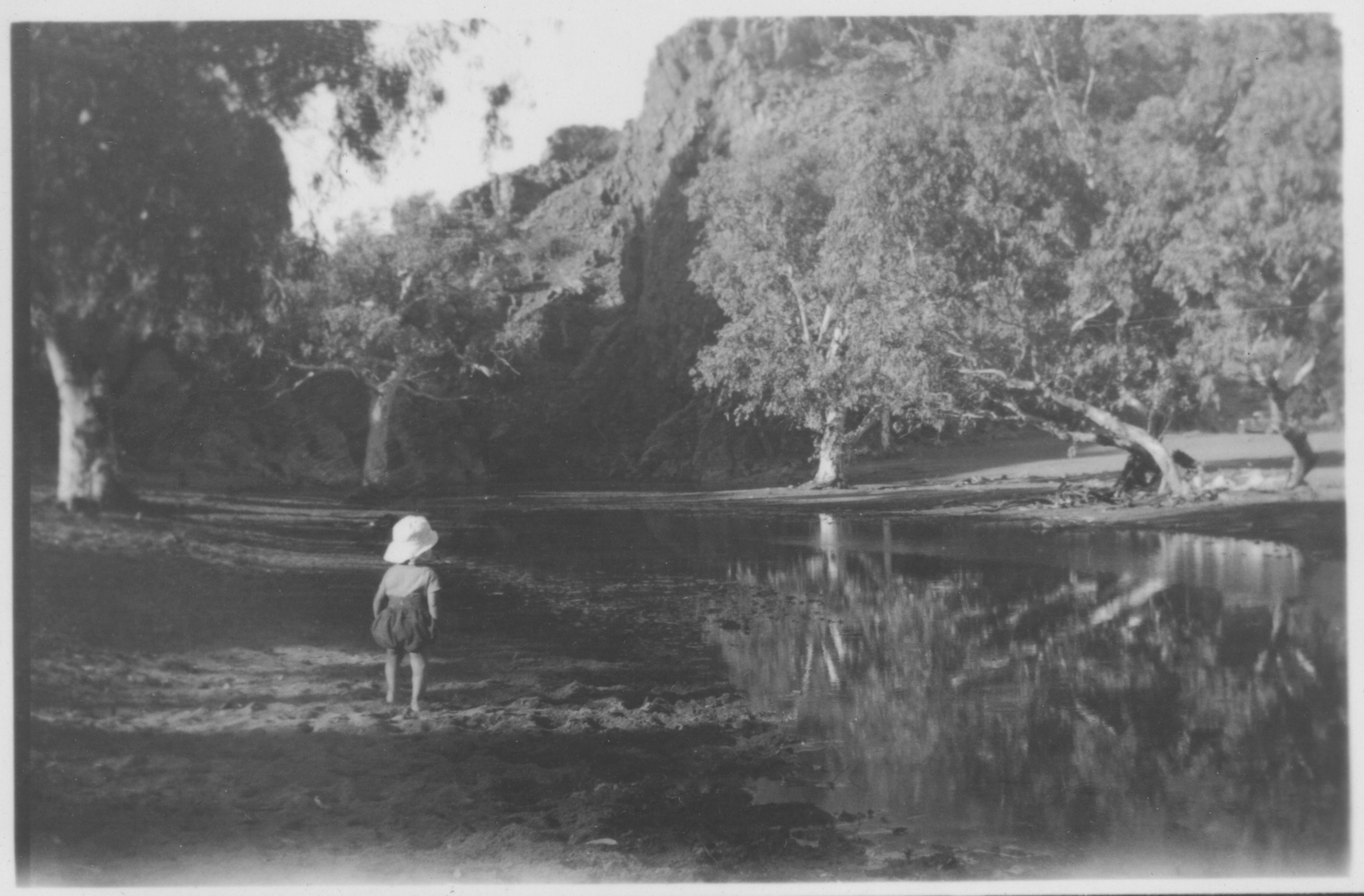
The waterhole at the southern side of the Gap, 1941

Emily Gap in 1946

== Geology ==
Around 300-350 million years ago a mountain building event created the MacDonnell Ranges. Since that time, folding, faulting and erosion have shaped the range and created numerous gaps and gorges, of which Emily Gap is one. The ranges are composed of many rock types, but are most famous for their red quartzite peaks and gorges. Other rock types include granite, limestone, sandstone and siltstone. Some of the valleys of the range contain fossil evidence of the inland sea that once covered central Australia.
