= George Edward Fulton =

George Edward Fulton (ca. August 1855 – 1 July 1895) was an engineer who ran an iron and steel foundry in the early days of South Australia.

== History ==
George was born the second son of David Fulton, of Craiglee House, Dennistown, Glasgow, and proprietor of the Duke Street calico printing works in that city. He was educated in Glasgow and, persuaded by the Hon. J. G. Ramsay that there was a future for him in South Australia, migrated and arrived in Adelaide in 1878.

He secured a position as a patternmaker at the locomotive workshops on Adelaide's North Terrace under L. Grayson, but, anxious to launch out for himself, he soon resigned and set up an office in Peel Street. He won a city corporation contract for enclosing city squares with iron railings. Not long after this, Arthur Robert Lungley (ca. 1848 – 11 May 1935), a government hydraulic engineer, joined with him to form G. E. Fulton & Co. They established "Fulton's Foundry" at Goodwood in 1879, initially to supply cast iron fencing for the Adelaide town square, then for other fancy architectural goods as well, such as fretwork, columns, ornamental capitals and so forth.

Aided by a substantial subsidy, he won a state government contract for £180,000 worth of cast-iron water and drainage pipes in 1884, enabling him to set up a factory in Kilkenny, for which purpose he travelled to Great Britain, ordering heavy machinery and engaging fifteen specialist workers. With characteristic energy, Fulton soon had production under way, to the discomfort of nearby residents. With New South Wales A. R. Lungley he took out patents for a hinged cover in May 1885, for a method of disconnecting water mains in December 1888, and for a method of supplying fuel to smelting furnaces in September 1889.

S. R. Wilson, a mining engineer with substantial experience of Broken Hill joined the company at the time of the great silver boom there, and the practical knowledge which Mr. Wilson brought to the firm led them to enter extensively into the manufacture of mining equipment and tools. The Broken Hill mines were good customers of the company, Broken Hill Proprietary in particular purchasing substantial machinery. They supplied furnaces to BHP's Block 14 and to the British companies in Broken Hill, pumping equipment for the Junction Smelting Works and two 300 horsepower steam engines for BHP. In 1901 his factory covered 5 acres and employed 350 men.

The reputation of the firm spread, and orders for mining machinery came from Victoria, New South Wales, and Queensland; in the latter State the firm supplied much of the machinery used on cattle stations. When the West Australian mines began to attract attention, S. R. Wilson left the company to take charge of his brother W. R. Wilson's interests in the Murchison, Coolgardie, and Mount Margaret districts.

The firm also provided of a new kind of steel pipe for the reticulation of the Beetaloo area, a work which was most successfully performed.

The importance of the West Australian goldfields soon became apparent to Mr. Fulton, and he was one of the first engineers visit the west and inspect the goldfields to ascertain what machinery they would require. Towards the end of 1894 he made a flying visit to both Coolgardie and the Murchison, securing a contract to erect of a public battery at Cue. Fulton died at Cue while he was supervising the battery's installation. His body was repatriated to Adelaide and received a public burial, which attracted a large attendance. A large water tank at Yalgoo for the Geraldton-Wiluna railway has G E Fulton and Co written on the western side. The company was liquidated in 1902, and purchased by Walter Weech Forward (of Forward Down and Co.), W. D. Watkins and A. C. Harley. The northern Kilkenny site was later owned by David Shearer and Co. The southern site (between Port Road and the railway line) became Australian Glass Manufacturing company's bottle manufacturing plant.

== Family ==
George Edward Fulton married Margaret Henderson ( – 7 March 1902), a daughter of the Presbyterian Rev. James Henderson (ca. 1820 – 19 April 1905) and a sister of Lady Downer, on 18 November 1881. Their homes were at Stanley Street, North Adelaide until 1888, then "Davaar" on the Hutt Street corner of South terrace (later owned by Sir Jenkin Coles), then from 1893 a residence in Brougham-place, North Adelaide, previously owned by E. M. Bagot. They also had a summer house at Mount Lofty.

They had four daughters, among them

- Maggie Ramsay "Madge" Fulton who married solicitor Charles Augustus Edmunds (ca. 1884 – 7 June 1941) on 25 April 1908. Charles was chairman of the South Australian Division of the Red Cross Society from 1935.
- Jane "Jean" or "Jeannie" Fulton (2 September 1886 – 5 October 1915), married Robert Milo Cudmore (13 February 1889 – 14 January 1969) on 27 September 1915. They settled at "Ivanhoe Downs", Morven, Queensland.
- youngest daughter Adelaide Fulton married James Henry Linden on 18 February 1914.
