= Edward Meade Bagot =

Ned Bagot
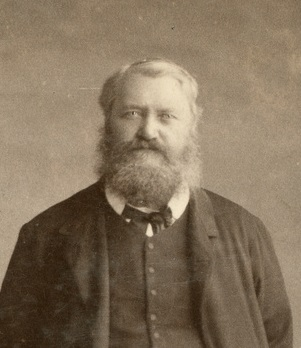

Personal details
- Born: Edward Meade Bagot; 13 December 1822 Rockforest, Clare, Ireland
- Died: 28 July 1886 (aged 63) Dry Creek, South Australia
- Spouse(s): Mary Pettman (d. 1855); Anne Smith
- Occupation: Pastoralist, landowner

Edward Meade Bagot (13 December 1822 – 28 July 1886) was an Irish-born Australian pastoralist and developer who held large properties in Central Australia.

== History ==
Edward Meade Bagot was born on 13 December 1822, in Rockforest, Tubber, County Clare, Ireland, the second son of Charles Hervey Bagot and his wife Mary (née MacCarthy). He was educated at a school run by Dr. King in Ennis, County Clare, and groomed for service with the East India Company, but was prevented by a health problem from taking a position. He emigrated to South Australia with his parents and siblings on the Birman, arriving in December 1840.

His father took up a pastoral property at Koonunga in 1841, which Bagot helped manage, then in 1843 took a position as accountant and store manager at the newly opened Kapunda copper mine at Kapunda. In 1850 he was appointed a director of the South Kapunda mine.

=== Pastoral interests ===
His properties included the Murthoo Run 1846–, Ned's Corner, on the River Murray, 1854–, Kulnine, Wall Wall, "Beefacres" (now Windsor Gardens) on the River Torrens, from 1853 to 1864, Mudla Wirra (with Richard Bowen Colley) 1865–, description of Beefacres at http://nla.gov.au/nla.news-article50169874

He purchased Northern Territory lease No.1 and No. 2 Undoolya Station, some 10 km east of Alice Springs in 1872, then his son Ted, his stepson James Churchill-Smith (1851 – 3 October 1922), and William Gilbert (1850–1923), son of Joseph Gilbert, drove 1,000 head of cattle to Undoolya Station from Adelaide and built the first homestead.

He took out a pastoral lease on Dalhousie Springs in 1873 and built the homestead (c. 100 km north of Oodnadatta), which is now in ruins. This area figured prominently in the search for Ludwig Leichhardt. Charles Todd ran the Overland Telegraph Line from Port Augusta to Macumba Well (c. 40 km north of Oodnadatta), with Benjamin Babbage supervising that part of the line, which was contracted by Bagot. His son, Ted, died there in 1881. The property, of 1,788 square miles (4,630 km^{2}) of excellent grazing country was purchased by John Lewis (father of Essington Lewis) in 1896.

He was persuaded to take up a mining lease in 1874, and set up the "Golden Reef Company", but dissolved it as soon as he found the claim worthless.

He was appointed Justice of the Peace in 1861 and resigned it in 1876. He was reappointed in 1877 after his insolvency had been settled. (He and partner Gabriel Bennett went into voluntary liquidation in 1877; creditors were awarded 5 shillings in the pound, but Bagot refused to evade his creditors as others had done, and by 1880 all his debts had been fully discharged, though it entailed selling most assets, including Undoolya station, on which he had just spent £30,000, at a loss staying on as manager.)

=== Other interests ===
He was a successful breeder of cattle and horses, winning many trophies. One of his horses, Don Giovanni, sired the 1873 Melbourne Cup winner, Don Juan. His thoroughbred mare Cowra won the Adelaide Cup in 1866 and 1867. Another horse, Neetlee had only one start, in 1867, when she famously threw her rider. Ned was a committee member of the S.A. Jockey Club in 1880. He was used as a test case to prove the validity of the Totalizator Repeal Act, which had the curious effect of exempting "the tote", while not a lawful instrument, from the Lotteries Act.

A section of grazing land held by Bagot and Bennett at Mile End, bounded by the thoroughfares now known as Henley Beach Road, South Road, Darebin Street and Bagot Avenue, was used by them from 1–2 January 1838 to 1869 as a racecourse ("The Barton Course"), notably for the South Australian Jockey Club. The first Adelaide Cup was held there in April 1864. Others were Saint Patrick's Day races in 1853 and Grand Annual Steeplechase in September 1866.

His skills as a judge of livestock were regularly called for by the Show Society.

== Death ==
His death was a matter of newspaper speculation for nearly a week. He had gone missing after leaving a Hunt Club celebration at H. E. Downer's at Magill. He was well-known (and sometimes, loved) for his eccentric dress — knee breeches, gaiters, shooting coat, and an out-of-fashion broad-brimmed belltopper hat, even in the hottest weather. There were many sightings of him up to North Adelaide, but then the trail went cold for the hundreds of citizens and police out searching for him. Eventually, he was found dead at the bottom of a Dry Creek quarry where he had presumably stumbled and fallen.

His residence on Brougham Place was purchased by George Edward Fulton.

== Family ==
Edward Meade "Ned" Bagot (13 December 1822 – 24 July 1886) married Mary Pettman (1830 – 5 March 1855) on 1 August 1853. He married again, to widow Anne Smith (née Walworth; 1830 – 16 February 1892), on 30 July 1857. Anne had at least one child, James Churchill-Smith (1851 – 4 October 1922) from her previous marriage.

Bagot's family included his 13 children:

- Edward Meade "Ted" Bagot Jr. (17 July 1848 - 5 June 1881)
- James Churchill-Smith (1851 – 4 October 1922)
- George Wall Wall Bagot (2 March 1858 - 3 July 1919)
- Richard Neetlee "Dick" Bagot (11 July 1860 – 20 January 1934)
- William Watermit Bagot (20 August 1861 – 16 July 1862)
- Charles Mulcra Bagot (9 March 1863 – 22 July 1895)
- Mary Bagot (25 August 1864 –)
- Lucy Cowra Bagot (18 November 1865 – 5 February 1898)
- Lille Nellnell Bagot (2 July 1867 – 1956)
- Sophie Rose Bagot (14 February 1869 – 5 November 1889)
- Annie Meade Bagot (31 July 1870 – 4 May 1910)
- Edgar Watermeit Bagot (8 September 1872 – 13 April 1895)
- Allan Walter Bagot (24 March 1874 – )

His 9 grandchildren:

- James Churchill-Smith Jr. (15 October 1894 – 15 March 1968)
- George Wall Wall Bagot Hughes, MBE, (15 September 1878 – 9 December 1940)
- Frank Neetlee Bagot ( – )
- John Neetlee "Jack" Bagot (17 December 1898 – 1977)
- Richard Neetlee Bagot Jr. (26 February 1904 – )
- Edward Meade "Ned" Bagot III (3 October 1888 - 23 September 1976)
- Charles Ernest Bagot (twin) (26 December 1893 – 7 December 1915)
- Almerta Annie "Girlie" Bagot (twin) (26 December 1893 – )
- George Edgar Bagot (24 April 1895 – 1987)
