= Horseshoe Bend Station =

Pastoral lease in the Northern Territory

Coordinates: 25°13′20″S 134°13′24″E

Location in Northern Territory

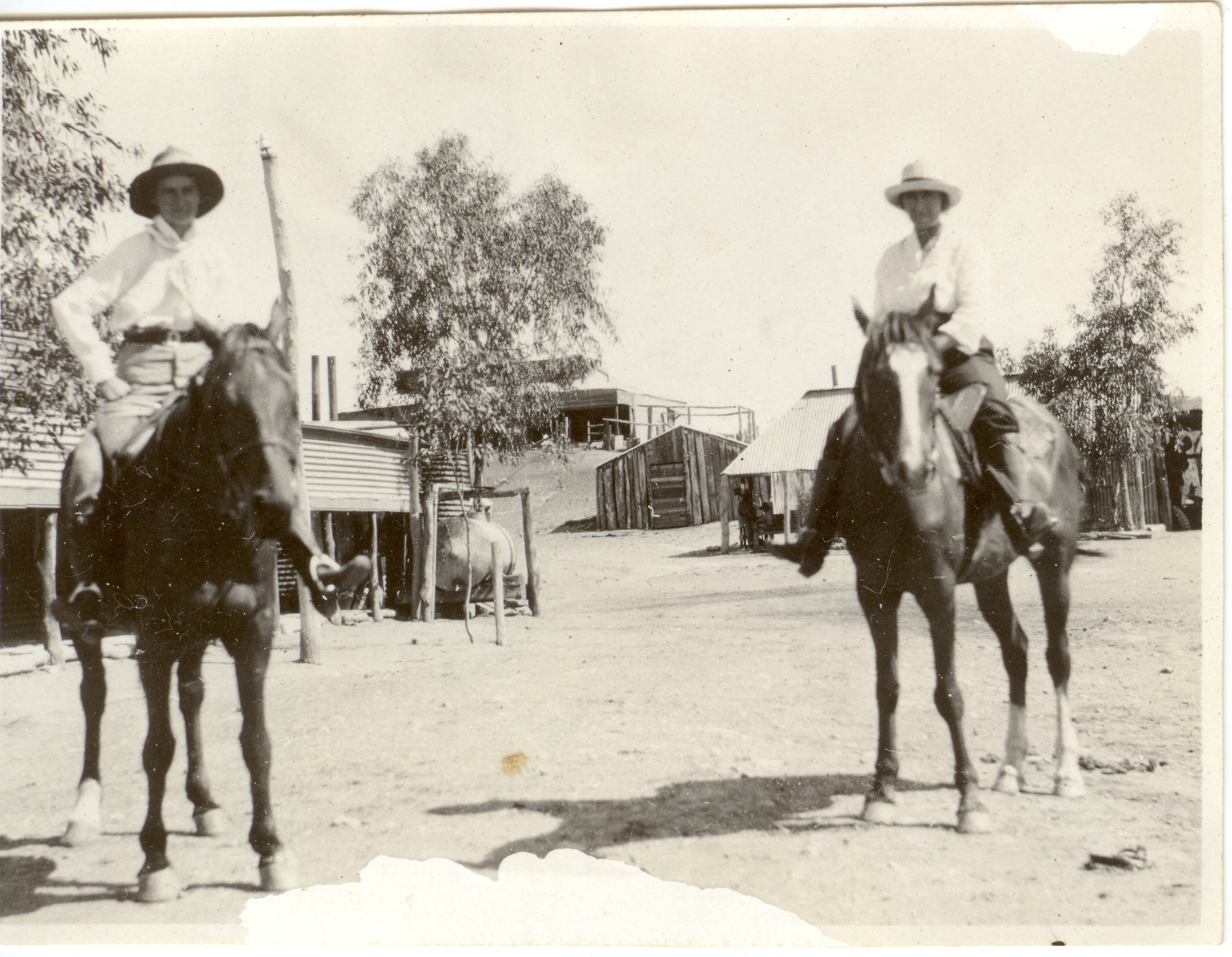
Two women on horseback at Horseshoe Bend Station, 1922

Horseshoe Bend Station is a pastoral lease that operates as a cattle station in the Central Australian region of the Northern Territory; it is located approximately 150 kilometres (93 mi) south of Alice Springs.

The property occupies and area of 5,936 square kilometres (2,292 sq mi) and includes approximately 80 kilometres (50 mi) of frontage to the ephemeral Finke River with a string of semi-permanent waterholes. Situated upstream of Crown Point Station, the homestead is on the Depot sandhills, 23 kilometres (14 miles) south of the junction of the Finke and the Hugh Rivers. The property includes a 2,000-square-kilometre (772 sq mi) desert block that has never been developed. The station was originally a staging post for the Overland Telegraph Line and the North–South Road, with a hotel and post office. The former Central Australia Railway line passed about 72 kilometres (45 mi) west of the homestead.

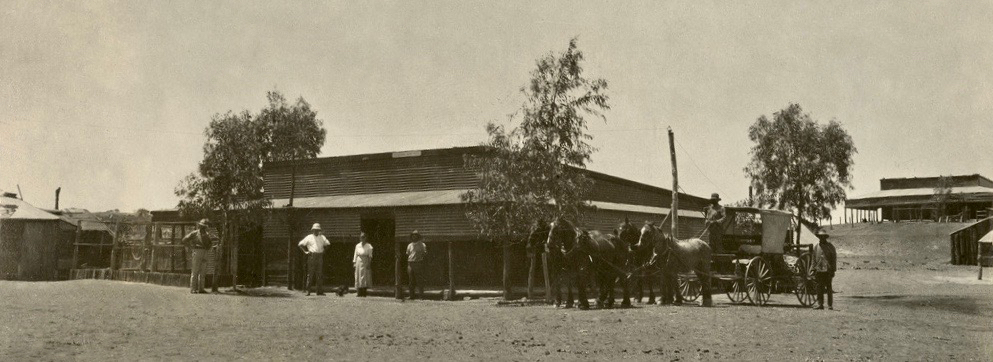
The hotel on Horseshoe Bend station, when the property was a staging post for the Overland Telegraph Line and the North–South Road; it also operated a post office

The area around the station was hit hard by drought in 1897, so much so that several of the surrounding properties were abandoned. The second owners of the property were the firm of Sargeant and Elliot, who also operated the hotel. They restocked the property with cattle; in 1908 they sent stock in 16 railway cattle cars from Oodnadatta to Adelaide and an unspecified number from Warrina. Sargeant, described as "one of the oldest and best-known residents of the far north", died in 1912.

Carl Strehlow, the founder of Hermannsburg, died and was buried at the station. He arrived at Horseshoe Bend in 1922 after a 250-kilometre (155 mi) buggy ride from Hermannsburg while en route to reach medical treatment in Adelaide.

By 2018, Horseshoe Bend Station was reported to be run by Viv Oldfield, who also owned other properties nearby including Clifton Hills Station, Andado Station and Pandie Pandie Station.

== See also ==
- List of ranches and stations
