= Crown Point Station =

Pastoral lease in the Northern Territory

Coordinates: 25.5017°S 134.3848°E

Location in Northern Territory

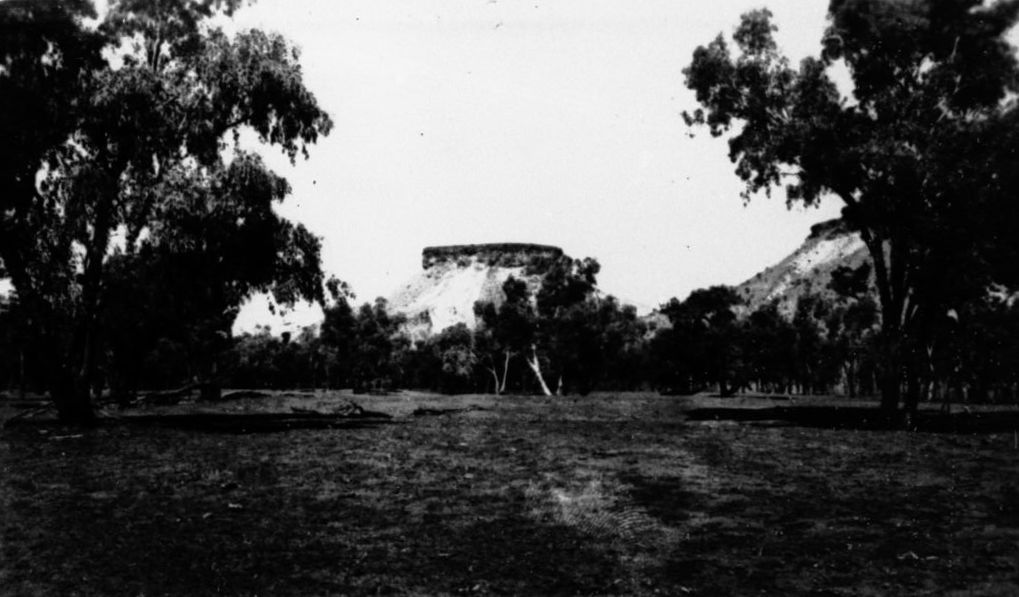
Crown Point, ca. 1905

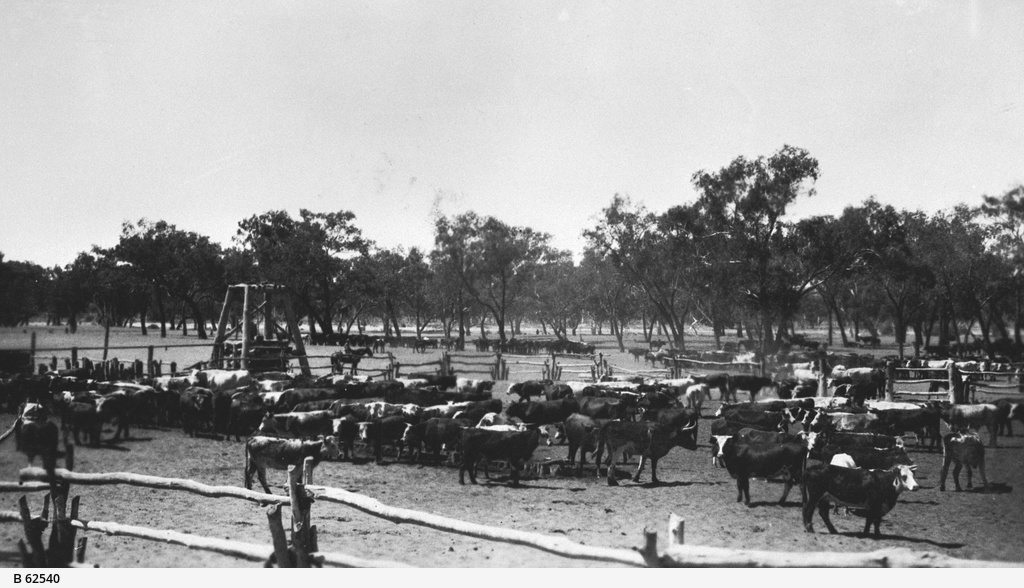
Some of the 1,100 head of cattle at Crown Point Station in the Northern Territory, 838 miles north of Adelaide, ca. 1925

Crown Point Station is a pastoral lease that operates as a cattle station in the Alice Springs region of the Northern Territory.

== Description ==
It is situated 22 kilometres (14 mi) north west of Aputula and 115 kilometres (71 mi) east of Kulgera. The ephemeral Finke River flows through the property which is bordered by Engoordina Station. The property is named after Crown Point, a pyramid shaped hill with flattened apex, near to a gorge along the Finke. The country is mostly gently undulating well covered by Mitchell grass and other fodder suitable for stock.

== History ==
The property was established at some time prior to 1886 at which time it was owned by Messrs Willoby, Harding and Co. The station was stocked with 3,000 head of cattle, 250 horses and 200 goats.

The owner of the property in 1890 was James Cowan who, along with another man named Bullimore, was killed in a railway accident the same year. The property occupied an area of 4,500 square miles (11,655 km^{2}) and was stocked with approximately 7.000 head of cattle and was being managed by Mr Ross. Drought struck the area in 1892 but this was followed by successive good seasons from 1893 to 1897. By 1910 the owner of the property was Horace Cowan and it was being managed by Richard Taylor.

The property was placed on the market in 1937 when it occupied an area of 4,646 square miles (12,033 km^{2}). Stock were watered by the Bloodwood Bore and 17 other wells as well as the Finke and Goyder Rivers.

== Historic photographs ==
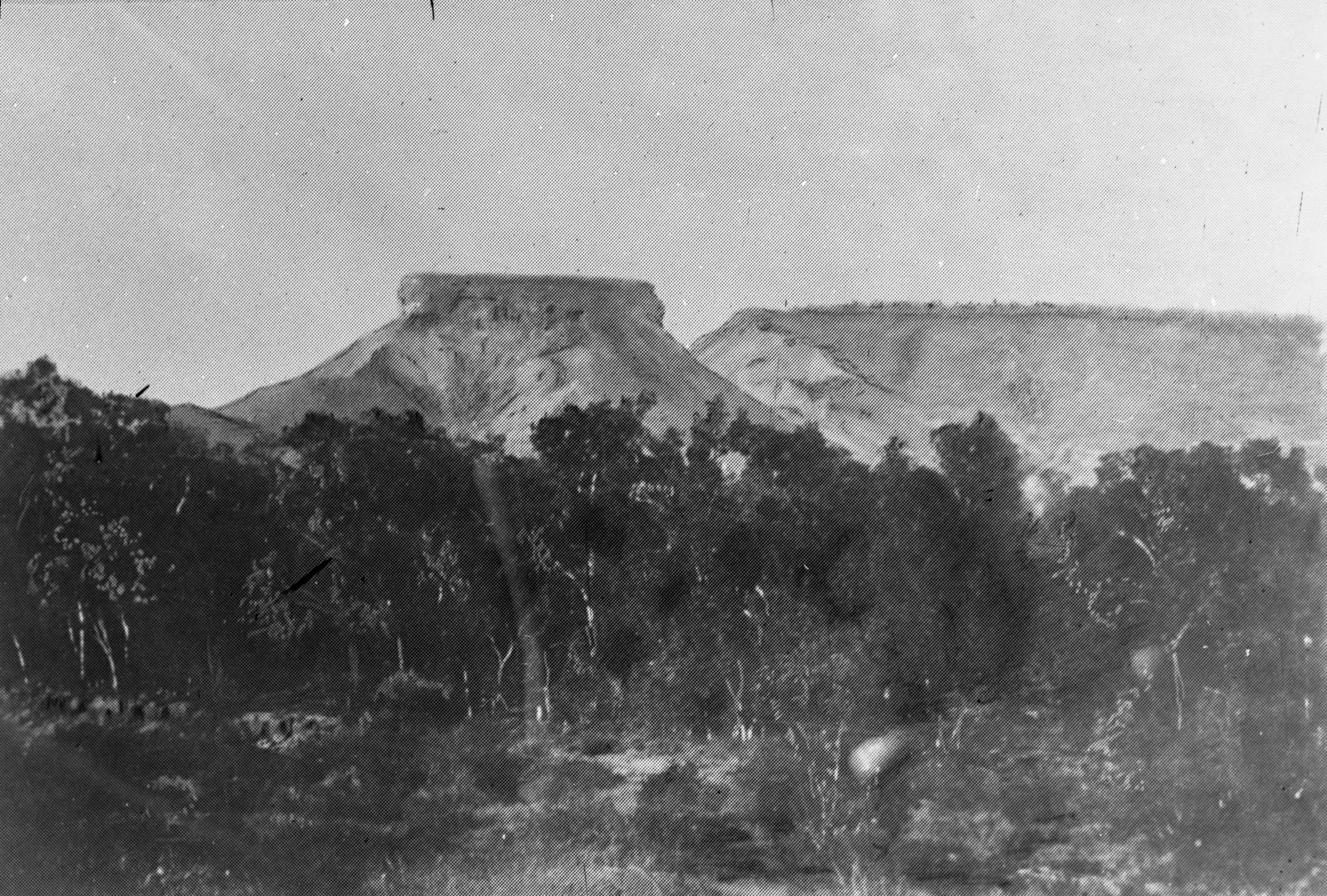

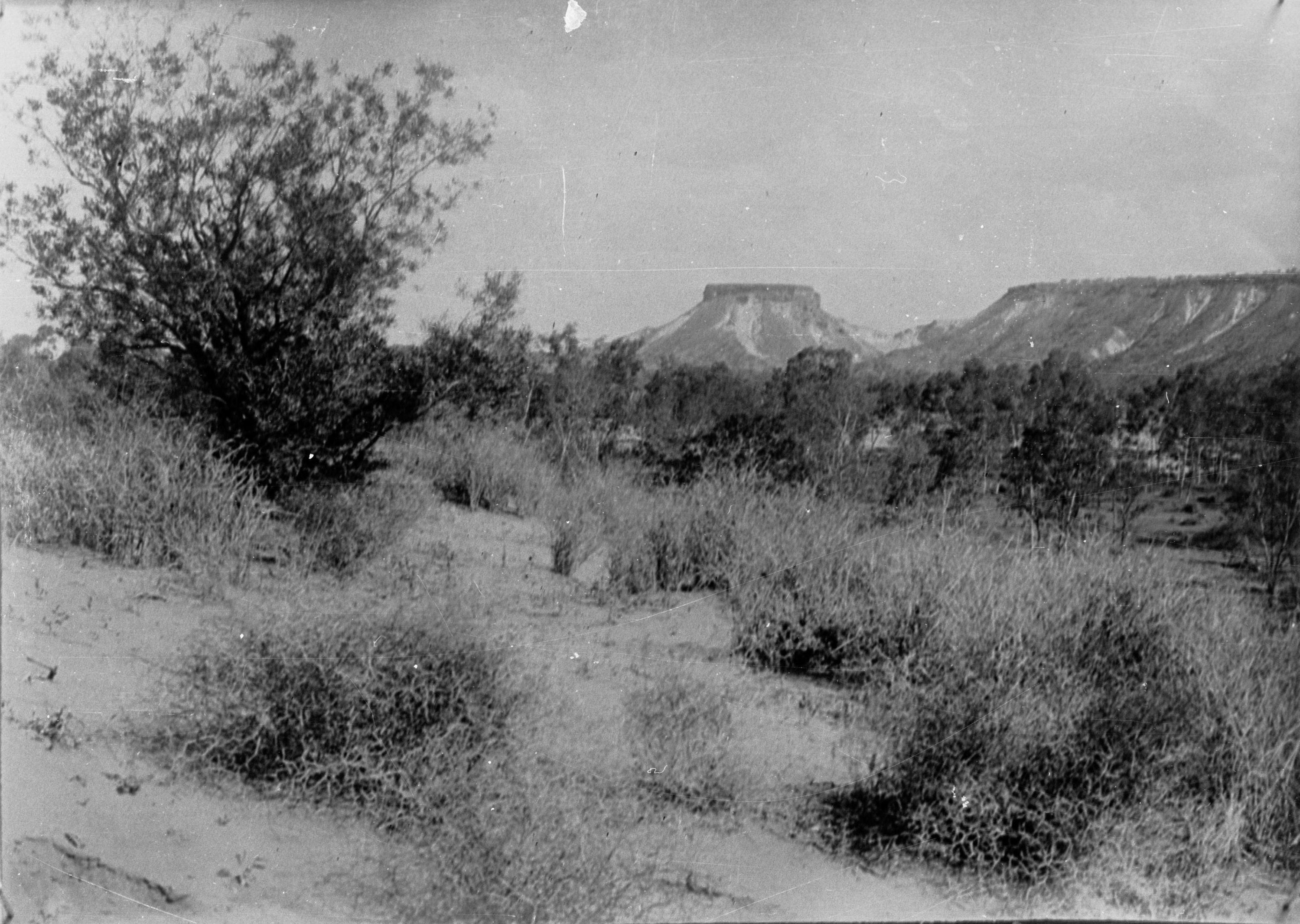

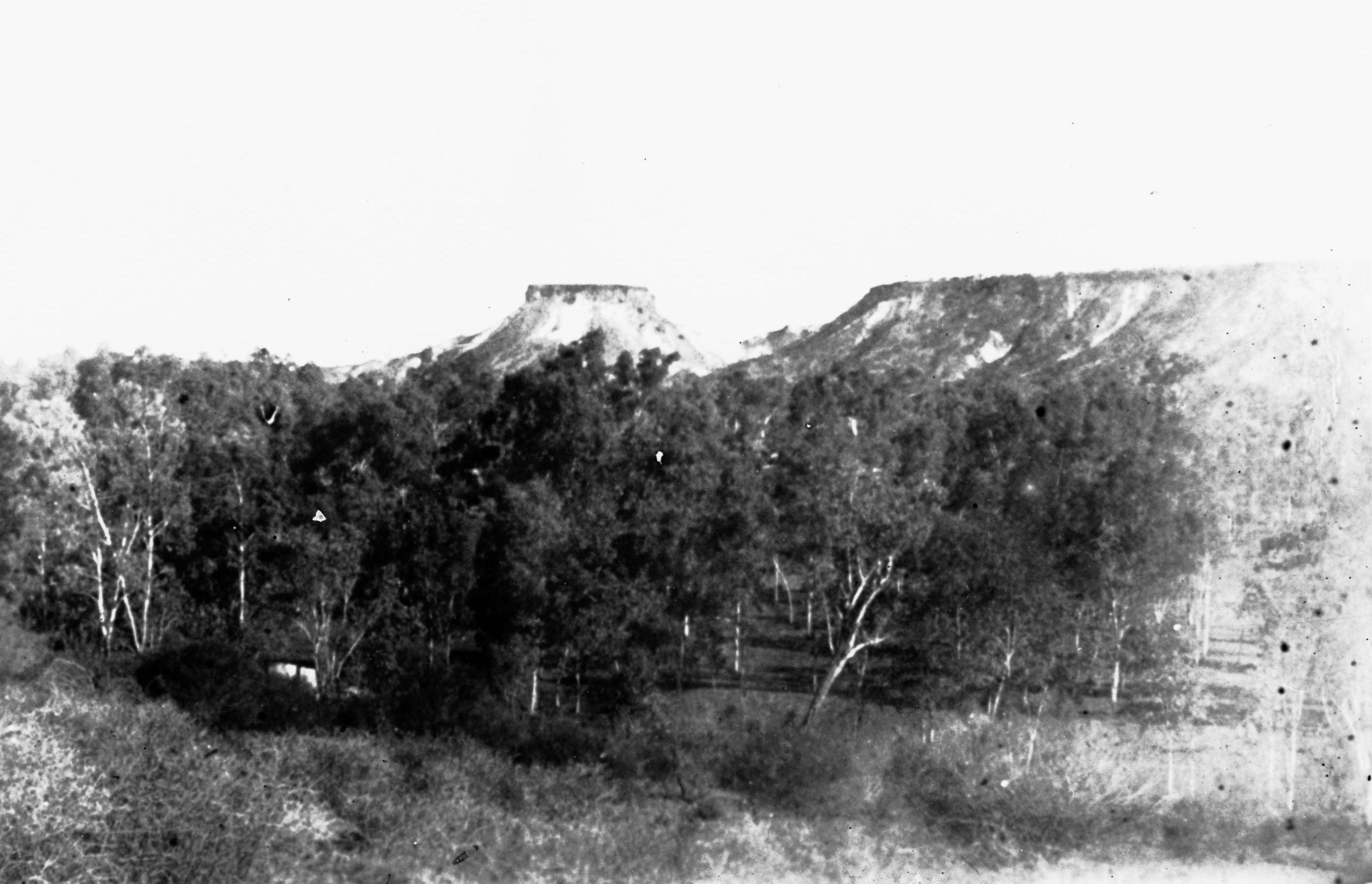

== See also ==
- List of ranches and stations
