= Mary Hayes =

Mary Hayes is a given name. Notable people with the name include:

- Mary Hayes Allen (1875–1935), American educator
- Mary Hayes Chynoweth (1825–1905), American psychic
- Mary Hayes Davis (c. 1884–1948), American writer, newspaper editor and publisher, and movie theater owner
- Mary Hayes Houghton (1837–1921), American journalist
