= Owen Springs Station =

Pastoral lease in the Northern Territory

Coordinates: 23.876116°S 133.469961°E

Location in the Northern Territory

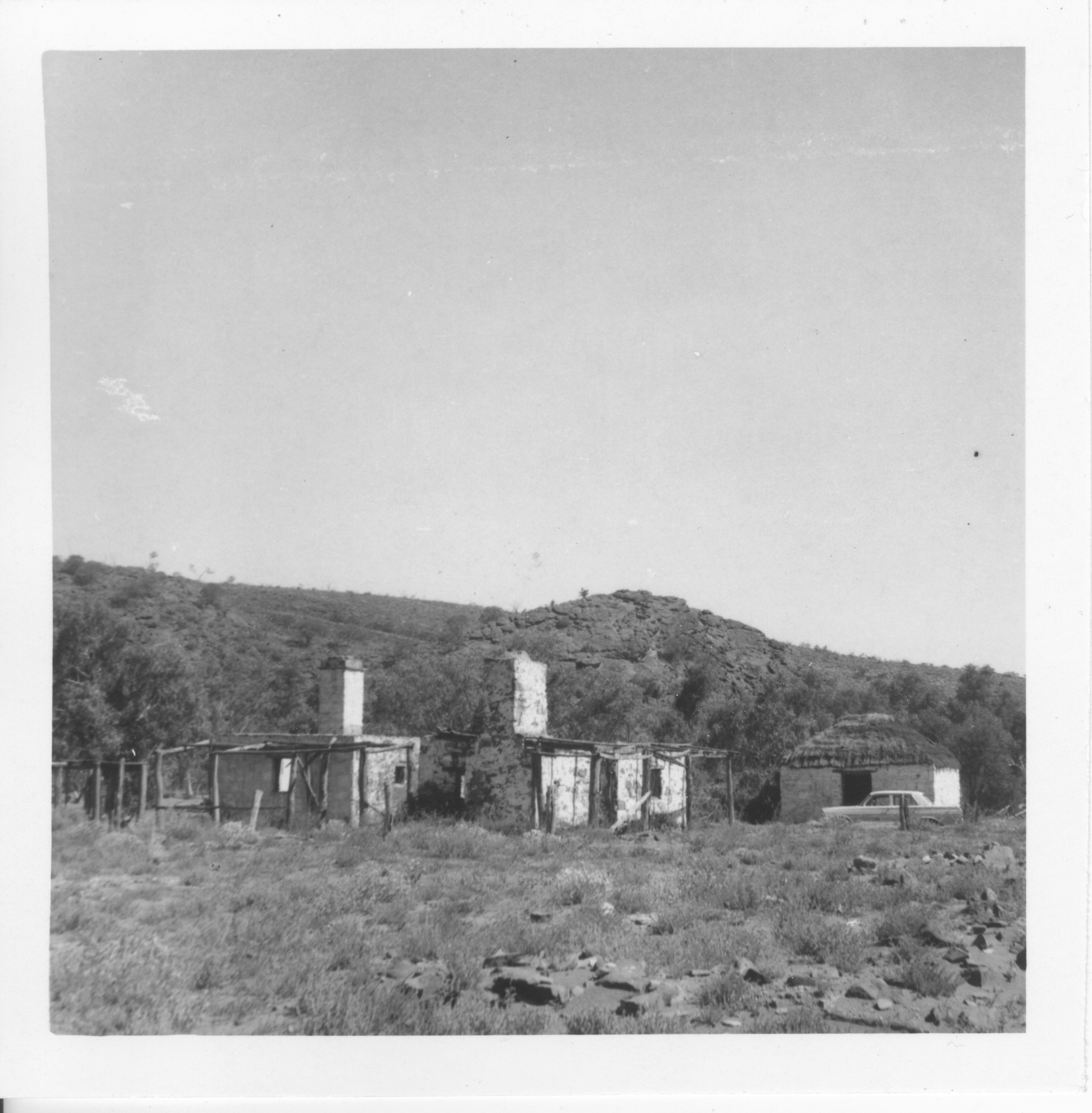
The Owen Springs homestead in the 1960s during a visit from the Alice Springs Camera Club

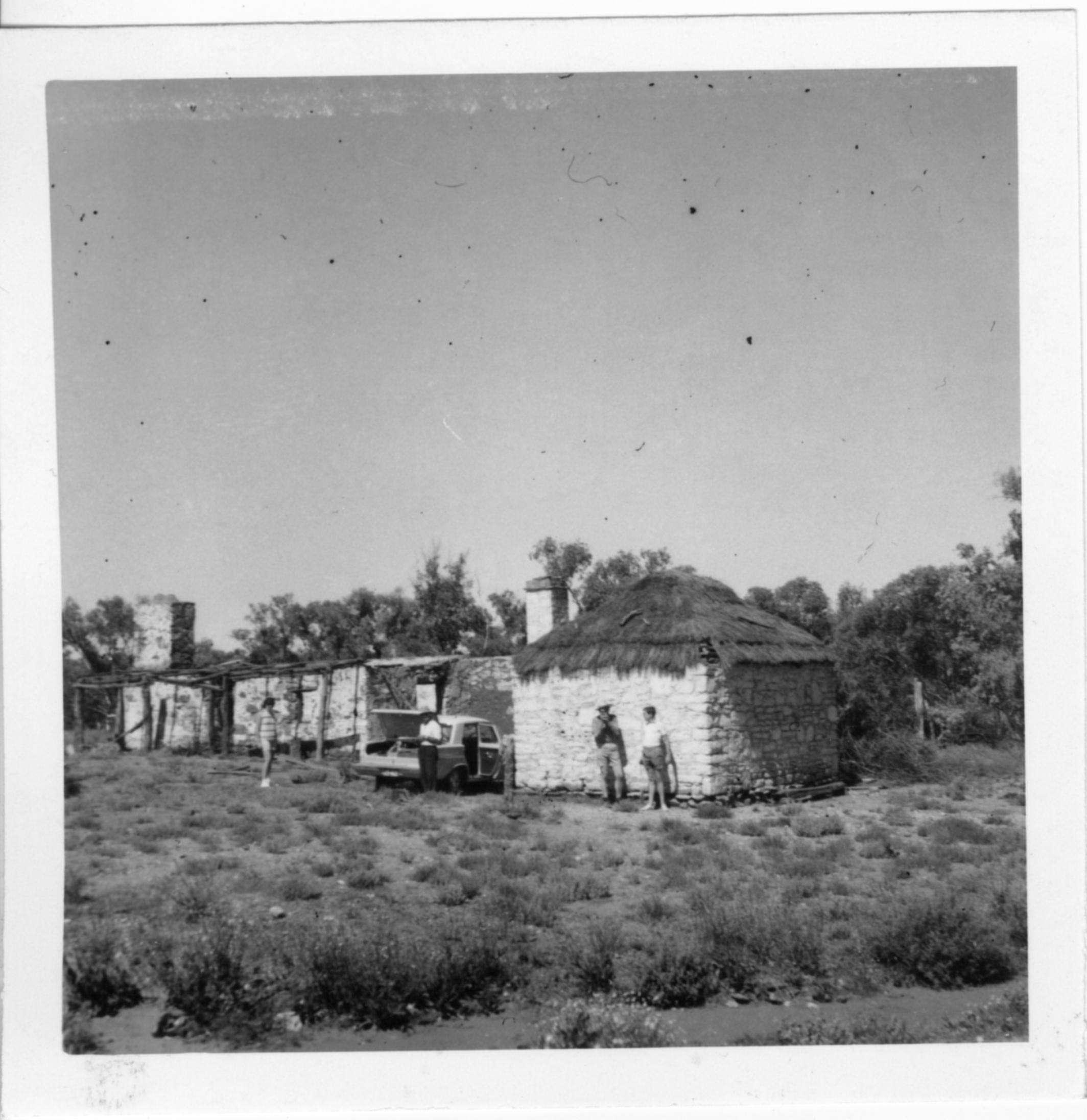
The Owen Springs homestead in the 1960s during a visit from the Alice Springs Camera Club

Owen Springs Station, now known as Owen Springs Reserve is a former pastoral station and now a 1,570-square-kilometre (606 sq mi) nature reserve west of Alice Springs in the Northern Territory of Australia. The Hugh River and Waterhouse Range (Urehne Pwetere) run through the reserve. It also features the first pastoral homestead built in Central Australia.

The traditional owners of this land are the Western and Central Arrernte people who have lived on Owen Springs Station and adjoining land for thousands of years.

== History ==
Explorer John McDouall Stuart's route through Central Australia passed through Owen Springs during his early 1860s expeditions. The Australian Overland Telegraph Line originally followed his track through Lawrence Gorge in the Waterhouse Range.

William Gilbert drove 1000 head of cattle from Adelaide to the MacDonnell Ranges in 1872, with Ted Bagot (1848–1881) and his foster-brother James Churchill-Smith (1851–1922). It was considered to be one of the great droving feats in Australian pastoral history. Gilbert obtained the lease for Owen Springs station in 1873, appointing Archie Conway as manager. The station was stocked with cattle and horses and two log huts were constructed. The first hut was completed by 7 August 1873 and the other was nearly completed. These timber buildings were the earliest buildings to be constructed in Central Australia. He sold the station after the death of his father to Sir Thomas Elder in 1886, who attempted to breed horses for the Indian Army. After sustaining significant losses, Elder was forced to sell Owen Springs in 1894, inclusive of the stock to an unidentified stock and station agent. The following year a consortium comprising Charles Gall, Allen Breaden and Sir Sidney Kidman purchased the station. From 1896 to 1901, Kidman and his brother Sack mustered horses off Owen Springs and sold them into southern markets before abandoning the station. Dennis White, a bushman who formed part of Peter Warburton's exploration team, committed suicide at Owen Springs Station in 1898.

In 1905, Norman Richardson purchased both Owen Springs and Undoolya Station. William Hayes (1827–1913) purchased numerous blocks, including Owen Springs between in 1903 and 1907. The Hayes family then sold Owen Springs to Hurtle and Tom Kidman, nephews of Sidney Kidman in 1930 only to purchase them back in 1937. William's son Edward and his new bride Jean (née Bloomfield) took on the management of the property. Contagious bovine pleuropneumonia was inoculated on the property in 1950. In 1992, 87 hectares (210 acres) of land was excised from the pastoral lease to create the site for the penal facility now known as the Alice Springs Correctional Centre.

Owen Springs was owned by the Hayes family until the death in 1999 of Mrs Elizabeth Milnes, the daughter of Edward Hayes.

== Owen Springs massacre ==
In 1887 a massacre of approximately 30 Aboriginal people took place at the station; this massacre was in response to alleged cattle killing.

== Nature reserve ==
Owen Springs opened as a nature reserve in April 2003 and is now managed by the Parks and Wildlife Commission of the Northern Territory.

The homestead and yards were listed on the Northern Territory Heritage Register under the name Old Owen Springs Homestead and Yards on 3 November 2004. Conservation works were completed the homestead during the years 2011 and 2012.

== See also ==
- Owen Springs Power Station
- Alice Springs Correctional Centre
