= Stan Cawood =

Australian tourism pioneer (1907–2003)

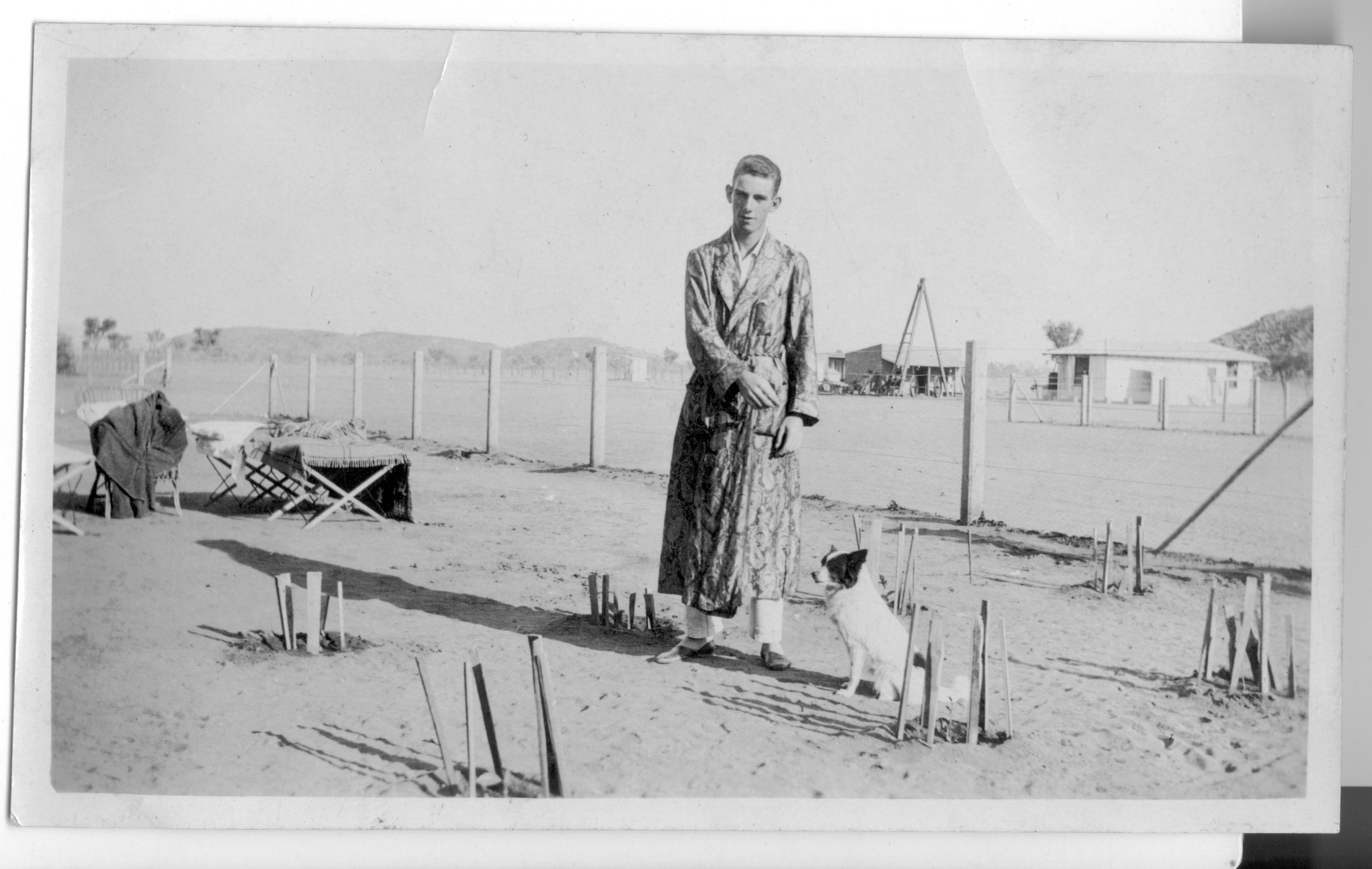
Stan Cawood, camping outside The Residency (Alice Springs) during the summer heat), c. 1927

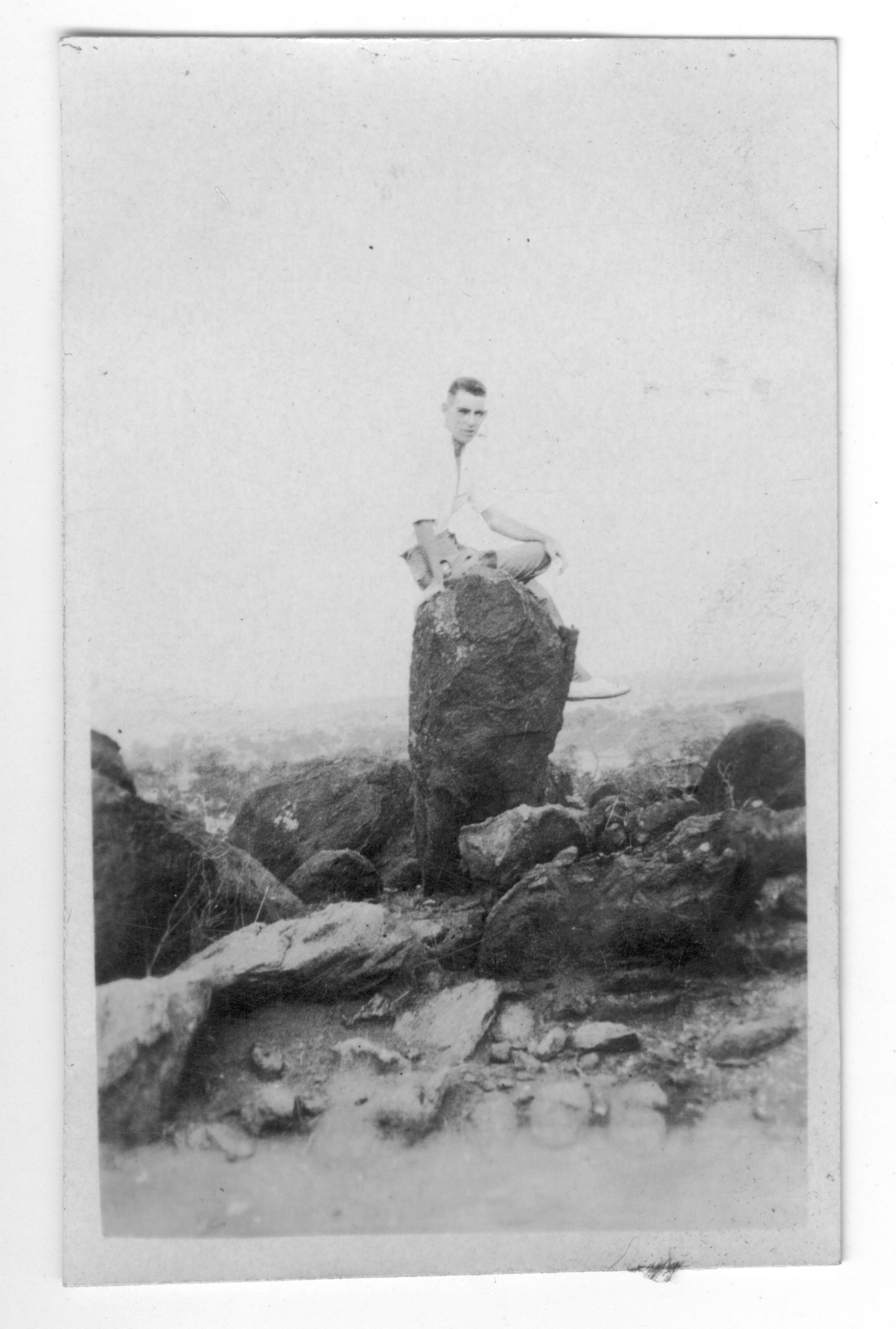
Stan Cawood during Kookaburra” expedition in 1929

Stanley Walter Cawood (8 March 1907 – 17 October 2003) was a pastoral worker, driver and tourism pioneer in Central Australia. He was the son of John Charles Cawood and spent some of his early life, between 1926 and 1929, living at The Residency in Alice Springs (Mparntwe) during his father's period as government resident of Central Australia.

== Early life ==
Cawood was born in Bellingen, New South Wales and, after primary schooling there, he attended De La Selle Collage in Armidale and then St Joseph's College in Hunters Hill. After completing his schooling he began working as a jackaroo in New South Wales before traveling to Kolkata, then known as Calcutta, in India to deliver 500 horses that had been sold to the Indian Army.

== Biography ==
Around the time that his father was appointed government resident Cawood moved to the Northern Territory where he worked as a jackaroo at Lake Nash Station, nearby to Alpurrurulam, where he was based for two years. He would sometimes travel with the police officer, constable Harry Allen over the Sandover track, to visit his father in Alice Springs; their vehicle was the second to be able to cover this route.

In 1928 and 1929 Cawood began driving for Bond's Tours, operated by Bert Bond, one of the first tourism operators in Central Australia who based his business from Alice Springs and he would take tour groups to places like Arltunga and Palm Valley; these tours often lasted several days. In 1929 he joined the search for the Kookaburra (aircraft) and helped retrieve the bodies of Keith Anderson and Henry Smith "Bobby" Hitchcock where they had crash landed in the Tanami Desert; he worked alongside William George Murray They reached the Kookaburra on 13 June 1929.

Later, in a newspaper report, Cawood recalled having seen Anderson and Hitchcock when they were refueling in Alice Springs before their crash and that he tried to impress on the importance of carrying ample water but that his warning was laughed off. Cawood said that there was an attempt to switch the last can of petrol for the journey with a can of water but that Anderson refused saying: "[n]o thanks. Petrol is more precious to me than water".

In 1932 Cawood married Ethel Underdown, the sister of Ly Underdown, and, soon after their marriage, they moved to New South Wales where Cawood took work as a forester with the New South Wales Forestry Department. They later moved to Queensland where he was the manager of a mill and, during World War II, begun cutting timber for the Army. In 1941, after contracting Dengue fever, he was sent to Sydney where he worked in procurement for the Army.

In 1942 he returned to Alice Springs where he managed the Capitol Cafe an Theatre which were owned by his moth-in-law Daisy Underdown. After the war Cawood began driving a truck and transporting cooper from the Home of Bullion mine, near Barrow Creek, and later from Hart Range. He also used his truck to transport beer from Alice Springs to Darwin.

In 1949 Cawood founded the Territory Transport Association in order to protect the interests of road transport operators in the Northern Territory; he also formed Co-ord which coordinated road and rail freight between Alice Springs and Larrimah as a part of a contract with the Commonwealth Government. He also acted as its chairman of directors from 1953 to 1957. Also in the 1950s Cawood started a tourism business, which he named Alice Springs Tours, which took visitors to what is now the Uluṟu-Kata Tjuṯa National Park and the Watarrka National Park. Eventually Cawood also took over the management of The Chalet, nearby to Uluṟu and he would run this for 20 years.

In 1961 Cawood sold his interests in Co-ord to focus on tourism and was part of establishing the Central Australian Tours Association and became its first chairman; another member of this association was Bernie Kilgariff. This was the first industry organisation in the region and it was later sold in the late 1970s.

In 1976 Cawood and his wife retired to live at Palm Cove, Queensland.

Cawood died on 17 October 2003 aged 96.

== Oral history ==
Three oral history recordings of Cawood's are held by Library & Archives NT.

== Collections ==
A collection of images taken by Cawood are available on Wikimedia Commons as a part of the Central Australian Historical images collection: Stan Cawood Collection.

== Legacy ==
- The Stan Cawood Truck Parking Bay, a rest area nearby to Ali Curung (Alekarenge), is named for Cawood.
- Cawood Street in Kilgariff, a suburb of Alice Springs, is also named for him.
