= Coniston massacre =

Massacre in Northern Territory, Australia

- Location within Northern Territory
- Date: August 14 – October 18, 1928
- Location: Coniston, Central Australia; 22°02′35″S 132°29′28″E
- Casualties: estimated at 90 people

The Coniston massacre, or series of massacres, took place in the region around the Coniston cattle station in the territory of Central Australia (now a part of the Northern Territory) between 15 August to 13 September 1928. It is the last known officially sanctioned massacre of Indigenous Australians and is considered by some to be one of the last events of the Australian frontier wars.

The massacre occurred in response to the murder of dingo hunter Frederick (Fred) Brooks, who was killed by a Aboriginal man on 7 August 1928 at a place called Yukurru. After the massacre the site became known as Brooks Soak. In a series of punitive expeditions led by Northern Territory Police constable William George Murray, many Warlpiri, Anmatyerre, and Kaytetye people were killed.

Official records, based of Murray's reports at the time state that 31 people were killed, however, analysis of documentation, remains found and Aboriginal oral histories reveal that the fatalities were likely to have ranged between 70 and 300 people. A recent study estimated that 90 people were killed.

== Background ==
Central Australia was Australia's last colonial frontier, sparsely populated and, by 1928, was facing the fourth year of the harshest drought on record. Parched conditions, though later discounted by authorities as a precipitating factor, were to play a key role in events at Coniston. (Note: In follow up inquiries the Commonwealth Government consistently downplayed or dismissed the drought and its effect as non-existent, or nugatory.) Appropriating water resources was fundamental to pastoral economy, and exclusive control over water was a priority to maintain cattle in good condition on any station. With the worsening of the drought, as waterholes dried up, the starving nomadic Aboriginals were forced to move back in towards the permanent waterholes and soaks located on the new station properties. It was generally believed in the white community that the interests of traditional Aboriginal land owners and those of cattle stations could not be reconciled. Either one or the other must prosper. (Note: 'If this country is to be settled with a healthy white population, we must give the pioneers every protection both for themselves and their stock otherwise the country must be left to the natives who have not the slightest idea of development in any shape or form.' Herbert Noblet to JC Cawood in the aftermath of the massacre.) Pastoralists regarded their presence, begging for food or spearing cattle, as an "aggravation", and would drive the incoming Aboriginals from these few remaining water sources, according to Cribbin, to ensure the survival of their cattle. (Note: While the relative prominence of Coniston is owed to this work, the book has virtually no footnotes and the sources are therefore not verifiable; yet Windschuttle – who considers that the 'role of the footnote is to make historians publicly accountable' – among others, considers the work an authority. Cribbin's story, however, contains errors of fact, is replete with incidents unmentioned in other sources, and misconstrues the sequence and nature of events (when compared with official testimony and records). It is the narrative interpretation of a journalist who did not apply even the most rudimentary archival research skills of the academic historian. Many of the inconsistencies in Cribbin's account have been inherited by subsequent writers, notably Bruce Elder and the supposedly circumspect Keith Windschuttle.')

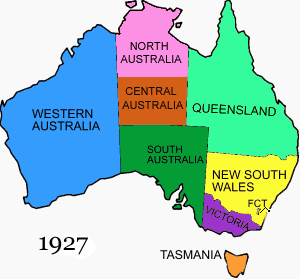
North Australia (pink) and Central Australia (brown)

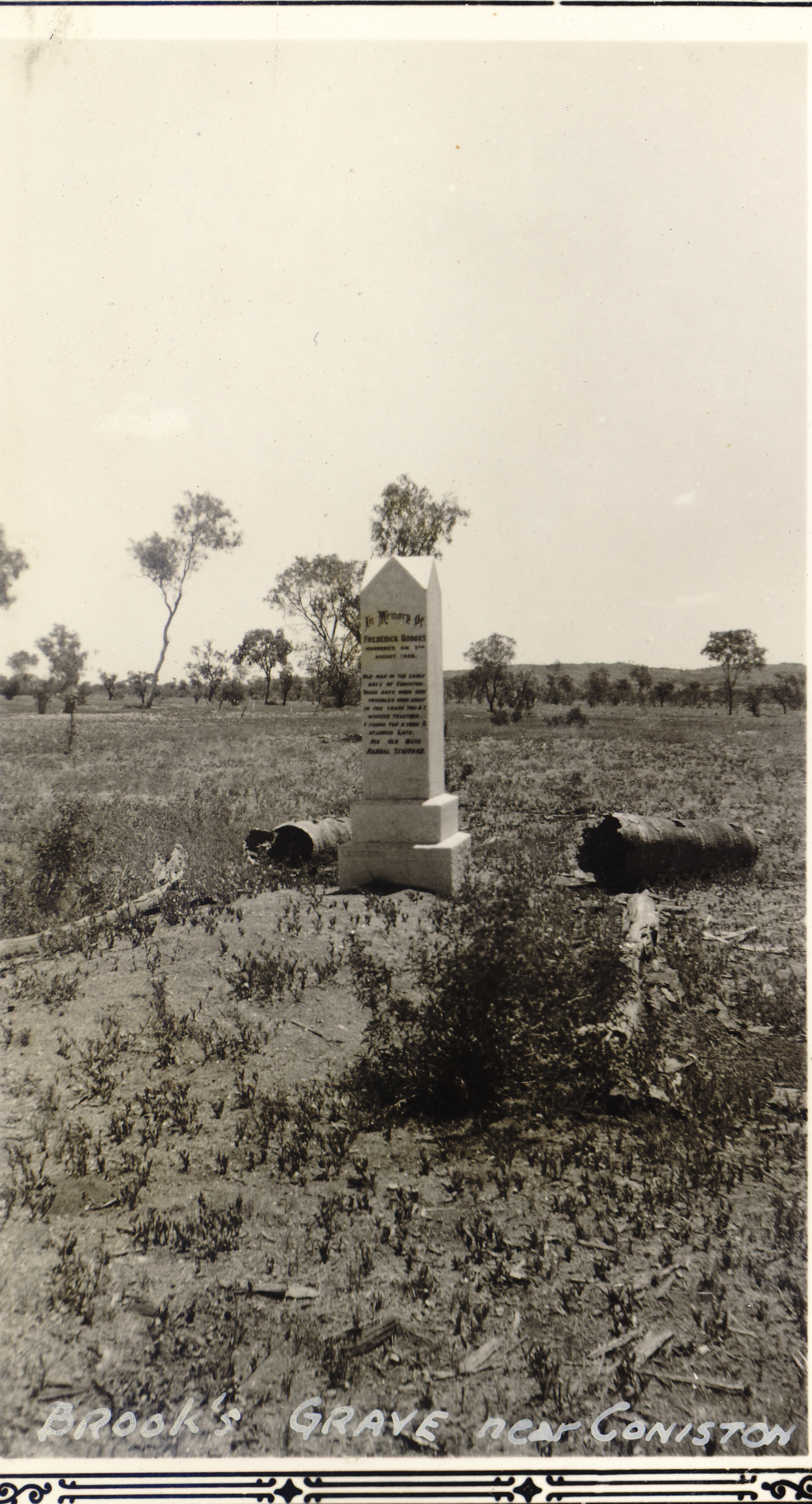
Fred Brook's grave near Coniston, photo taken between 1938 and 1948

=== The killing of Fred Brooks ===
61-year-old Fred Brooks had worked as a station hand on Randall Stafford's Coniston station, 240 mi (390 km) north-west of Alice Springs, in a number of stints since World War I. In July 1928 he asked Stafford if he could have a go at dingo hunting. Stafford warned him that he and the woman he cohabited with, Alice, had been threatened by "Myalls" (an offensive term denoting traditional living Aboriginal people) and that venturing any further than 22 km (14 mi) west would be unsafe. Alice was believed to have broken kinship rules by living with the white man. Brooks bought two camels and on 2 August, left with two 12-year-old Aboriginal children, Skipper and Dodger, as his camel handlers, to trap dingoes for the 10 shilling (equivalent to AU$45.49 in 2022) bounty on their scalps. Approaching a soak 14 mi (23 km) from the homestead, he found around 30 Ngalia-Warlpiri people camped. Brooks knew some and decided to camp with them. The first two days were uneventful and Brooks caught several dingoes.

According to evidence in a later inquiry, on 4 August, Charlton Young and a companion who were exploring the area for a mining company, stopped by and warned Brooks that the Aboriginal people had been getting "cheeky" lately by visiting the mining camps heavily armed, demanding food and tobacco. About the same time several Aboriginal children were being taken away to Alice Springs. According to one version, Brooks had been approached several times to trade but had so far refused, until 6 August. The Aboriginal tradition, related to Peter and Jay Read by Alec Jupurrula and Jack Japaljarri, holds that a Warlpiri, Japanunga (Note: Also transcribed as Japanangka.) Bullfrog and his wife were approached by Brooks who asked Bullfrog if he could take his wife, Marungardi, to do Brooks' washing in exchange for food and tobacco. Marungardi performed her chores but, either returned to Japanunga's camp without the promised supplies or did not return, so at dawn the next day, Japanunga killed Brooks. A third account is more detailed, stating that Japanunga became enraged when he found his wife in bed with Brooks and attacked him, severing an artery in his throat with his boomerang. This account claims that Bullfrog, his uncle Padirrka, and Marungardi then beat Brooks to death, and that Aboriginal elders, in fear for the foreseeable consequences, then banished Bullfrog and Padirrka and ordered Brooks' two boys to return to the homestead and say that he had died of natural causes. (Note: Under traditional law, Bullfrog had a right to physically punish Brooks for non-payment but no right to kill him. Bullfrog and Padirrka were banished while Marungardi, who had only held Brooks while he was beaten to death was allowed to remain as she was not guilty of anything in the eyes of traditional law. In their eyes, the banishment absolved the tribe of responsibility and they moved from the soak to Ngundaru, a sacred site 4 mi (6.4 km) closer to Coniston, believing they were safe from retribution.)

=== Discovery of Brooks' body and responses ===
Accounts vary as to who first came across Brooks' body. Until the publication of Cribbin's book in 1984, it was believed that Bruce Chapman, the prospector, was first on the scene. The following day an Aboriginal person named Alex Wilson camped at the now deserted soak and finding the body rode back to the station, where he described hysterically how Brooks had been "chopped up" by 40 Aboriginal people and the parts stuffed in a rabbit burrow.

Randall Stafford had been in Alice Springs requesting police to attend to prevent the spearing of his cattle. He returned to be told of the murder and dismemberment of Brooks but chose to wait for the police. No one returned to the soak and no one attempted to retrieve the body. On 11 August, the Government Resident John C. Cawood sent Constable William George Murray, the officer in charge at Barrow Creek who also held the post of Chief Protector of Aborigines, (Note: Constable Murray joined the police force in 1919 and, due to shortages of outback policemen, was posted the very next day to the Rankin River police station without any training. In 1928 he was given charge of Barrow Creek which included a government vehicle. Prisoners arrested on his rounds would wear horse hobbles and walk in single file chained to the vehicle. With no need for a horse the cattle stations supplied them when the terrain was too rough for a car.) to Coniston to investigate the complaints of cattle spearing. Told of the murder, Murray drove back to Alice Springs and telephoned Cawood, who refused to send reinforcements, telling Murray to deal with the Aboriginal people as he saw fit. Returning to Coniston, Murray questioned Dodger and Skipper who described the circumstances of the murder and named Bullfrog, Padirrka and Marungali as the killers. According to his own report, Murray also obtained the names of 20 accomplices. (He never recorded the names, or explained how his informants, who were not eyewitnesses, knew them; nor were these inconsistencies ever questioned at later proceedings.) Murray organised a posse consisting of tracker Paddy, Alex Wilson, Dodger, tracker Major (elder brother of Brooks' boy Skipper), Randall Stafford and two white itinerants Jack Saxby and Billie Brisco. (Note: None of the whites spoke Warlpiri. Paddy was the official tracker but he spoke only Aranda and English. Murray requested the use of Major to assist Paddy as a tracker because he spoke Warlpiri and Aranda however, Major spoke very little English. Communication problems caused confusion, for example, Major told Paddy that Woolingar was Padirrka's nephew and Paddy passed this on to Murray that he was Padirrka which was why his wounds were ignored and his companion Padygar arrested for Brooks' murder.)

== Massacre ==
Brooks was killed on or about 7 August 1928, and his body was partly buried in a rabbit hole. No eyewitnesses to the murder were ever identified, and there are conflicting accounts of the discovery of the body and subsequent events.

On 15 August, dingo trapper Bruce Chapman arrived at Coniston, and Murray sent Chapman, Paddy and Alex Wilson and three Aboriginal trackers to the soak to find out what happened. The three buried Brooks on the bank of the soak. (Note: On returning to Coniston Chapman complained of a headache. He died two days later of Meningitis and rumours quickly spread of a curse at Brooks Soak.) In the afternoon two Warlpiri, Padygar and Woolingar arrived at Coniston to trade dingo scalps. Believing them to be involved with the murder Paddy arrested them but Woolingar slipped his chains and attempted to escape. Murray fired at Woolingar and he fell with a bullet wound to the head. Stafford then kicked him in the chest breaking a rib. Woolingar was then chained to a tree for the next 18 hours. The next morning the posse, with Padygar and Woolingar following on foot in chains, set out for the Lander River where they found a camp of 23 Warlpiri at Ngundaru. With the posse encircling the camp, Murray rode in and was surrounded by Aboriginal people yelling, Brisco started shooting with Saxby and Murray joining in. Three men and a woman, Bullfrog's wife Marungali, were killed on the encounter, with another woman dying from her wounds an hour later. A subsequent search of the camp turned up articles belonging to Brooks. Stafford was furious with Murray over the shooting and the next morning returned to Coniston alone.

During the night, Murray captured three young boys who had been sent by their tribe to find what the police party was doing. Murray had the boys beaten to force them to lead the party to the rest of the Warlpiri but had they done so, they would have been punished by their tribe. To resolve the dilemma, the three boys smashed their own feet with rocks. Despite the injuries Murray forced the now crippled boys to lead the party; according to Cribbin. By nightfall they reached Cockatoo Creek where they sighted four Aboriginal people on a ridge. Paddy and Murray captured two but one ran with Murray firing several shots at him which missed, Paddy then knelt and fired a single shot hitting the fleeing man in the back and killing him instantly. After questioning the other three and finding they had no connection with the murder Murray released them. The next two days saw no contact with Aboriginal people at all as word had spread with many Aboriginal people heading into the desert, preferring to risk dying of thirst rather than face the police patrol. Returning to Coniston, Murray left Padygar, Woolingar and one of the three boys, 11-year-old Lolorrbra (known as Lala, who would become a chief witness at the enquiry), whose crushed feet had become infected, in Stafford's custody before heading north to continue the search.

Following tracks, the patrol came upon a camp of 20 Warlpiri, mostly women and children. Approaching the camp Murray ordered the men to drop their weapons. Not understanding English the women and children fled while the men stood their ground to protect them. The patrol opened fire, killing three men; three injured died later of their wounds and an unknown number of wounded escaped. By Murray's account, he met four separate groups of Warlpiri, and in each case was obliged to shoot in self-defence – a total of 17 casualties. He later testified under oath that each one of the dead was a murderer of Brooks. The Warlpiri themselves estimated between 60 and 70 people had been killed by the patrol.

On 24 August, Murray captured an Aboriginal person named Arkirkra and returned to Coniston, where he collected Padygar (Woolingar had died that night still chained to the tree) and then marched the two 240 mi (390 km) to Alice Springs. Arriving on 1 September, Arkirkra and Padygar were charged with the murder of Brooks while Murray was hailed as a hero. On 3 September, Murray set off for Pine Hill station to investigate complaints of cattle spearing. Nothing has been recorded about this patrol, but he returned on 13 September with two prisoners. On 16 September, Henry Tilmouth of Napperby station shot and killed an Aboriginal person he was chasing away from the homestead; this incident was included in the later enquiry. On 19 September, Murray again departed, this time under orders to investigate a non-fatal attack on the person of a settler, William "Nuggett" Morton, at Broadmeadows Station, by what Morton described as a group of 15 Warlpiri people who were also in the same area.

Morton, a former circus wrestler, had a reputation for his sexual exploitation of Aboriginal women and violence against both his white employees and Aboriginal people. On 27 August, he left his camp to punish Aboriginal people for spearing his cattle. At Boomerang waterhole he found a large Warlpiri camp; what happened here is unknown but the Warlpiri decided to kill Morton. During the night they surrounded his camp and at dawn 15 men armed with boomerangs and yam sticks rushed Morton. His dogs attacked the Aboriginal people, and after breaking free Morton shot one and the rest fled. Morton returned to his main camp and was taken to the Ti Tree Well mission where a nurse removed 17 splinters from his head and treated him for a serious skull fracture.

From the station, on 24 September, a party consisting of Murray, Morton, Alex Wilson and Jack Cusack (the latter two being of Aboriginal descent), embarked on a series of encounters: three incidents were later described by Murray, in which 14 more Aboriginal people were reportedly killed, but it is likely that there were more. At Tomahawk waterhole four were killed, while at Circle Well one was shot dead and Murray killed another with an axe. They then moved east to the Hanson River where another eight were shot. Morton identified all of them as his attackers. The party now returned to Broadmeadows to replenish their supplies before travelling north. No records of this patrol were kept. According to the Warlpiri, this patrol encountered Aboriginal people at Dingo Hole where they killed four men and 11 women and children. The Warlpiri also recount how the patrol charged a corroboree at Tippinba, rounding up a large number of Aboriginal people like cattle before cutting out the women and children and shooting all the men. There is anecdotal evidence that there were up to 100 killed in total at the five sites.

Murray was back in Alice Springs on 18 October where he was asked to write an official report on the police actions. The report was only several lines long; he wrote: "....incidents occurred on an expedition with William John Morton, unfortunately drastic action had to be taken and resulted in a number of male natives being shot." No mention was made of the number killed, the circumstances of the shootings or where they occurred.

== Trial of two Aboriginal people ==
The trial of Arkirkra and Padygar for Brooks' murder took place in the Supreme Court of Central Australia located in Darwin in North Australia on 7 and 8 November before Justice Mallam.

The first witness was 12-year-old Lolorrbra (known as Lala) who testified in detail that he saw Arkirkra, Padygar and Marungali kill Brooks. He also testified that all the Aboriginal people that had helped them were now dead. Murray took the stand next, his evidence becoming so involved in justifying his own actions in killing suspects that Justice Mallam reminded him that he himself was not on trial and to avoid facts not relevant to the guilt of the accused. The court then adjourned for lunch. The verdict was a foregone conclusion as all that remained was the reading of the confessions made by the accused in Alice Springs. Despite lunch for the jurors being provided by the local hotel, two of the jurors went home to eat. A furious Justice Mallam dismissed the jury, ordered a new jury be empanelled and a new trial to be convened the following day. The new trial began with Lolorrbra being asked to repeat his evidence. This time his evidence, although still maintaining that the accused were the murderers, was completely contradictory. Under cross examination it became apparent within minutes that he had been coached on what to say. When the prosecution tried to introduce the written confessions of the accused, Justice Mallam pointed out that as the accused had been charged by a South Australian rather than Central Australian magistrate he would disallow the statements. The prosecution declined to call the accused to testify. Murray took the stand next, angering Justice Mallam when he repeated his justifications for killing suspects. The judge remarked "It appears impossible for all those bands of natives to be associated with the murder of Brooks. It looks as if they were shot down at different places just to teach them and other aborigines a lesson." With no evidence of guilt presented, Justice Mallam ordered the jury to acquit the accused.

During his testimony, Murray said that the group had "shot to kill":

Justice Mallam: Constable Murray, was it really necessary to shoot to kill in every case? Could you not have occasionally shot to wound?

Murray: No your honour, what is the use of a wounded blackfellow hundreds of miles from civilization?
Justice Mallam: How many did you kill?
Murray: Seventeen your honour.
Justice Mallam: You mean you mowed them down wholesale!

—The Northern Territory Times, 9 November 1928

In the courtroom to hear this and other evidence of massacre was Athol McGregor, a Central Australian missionary. He passed on his concern to church leaders, and eventually to William Morley, outspoken and influential advocate of the Association for the Protection of Native Races, who did the most to secure a judicial enquiry. The Federal government was also under considerable pressure to act. The British media had been reporting on Australia's treatment of Aboriginal people (Australia was in financial difficulties at the time and an economic mission from London was considering financial assistance), a federal election was due on 17 November and the League of Nations had publicly criticised the case.

During the trial Murray was billeted with the Northern Australia police. Although Murray officially admitted to only 17 deaths, Constable Victor Hall said he was shocked with Murray's "freely expressed opinions of what was good enough for a blackfellow", and claimed he bragged to fellow officers that he had killed "closer to 70 than 17".

== Board of Inquiry ==
The Board of Inquiry was presided over by police magistrate A. H. O'Kelly and was deeply compromised from the start – its three members being hand-picked to maximise damage control, J. C. Cawood, Government Resident of Central Australia, and Murray's immediate superior, being one of them. Cawood revealed his own disposition in a letter to his departmental secretary shortly after the massacre: "…trouble has been brewing for some time, and the safety of the white man could only be assured by drastic action on the part of the authorities … I am firmly of the opinion that the result of the recent action by the police will have the right effect upon the natives."

The board sat for 18 days in January 1929 to consider three incidents (Brooks, Morton and Tilmouth) that resulted in the deaths of Aboriginal people, and in one more day, finished its report, finding that 31 Aboriginal people had been killed and that in each case the death was justified.

The hearing decided, in the face of indubitable evidence to the contrary, that there had been no drought in Central Australia, evidence of ample native food and water supplies and thus no mitigation for cattle spearing. A journalist for the Adelaide Register-News who travelled with the board during its tour of Central Australia to determine the claims of drought reported: "Five years of drought have burnt every blade of grass from the plains and left a wilderness of red sand...the wonder is that any living thing survives. Every settler visited by the Board had lost between 60 and 80 percent of his stock [to the drought] this year alone." The day after this report was published, a settler replied in the letters to the editor that the drought made the life of one ewe worth more to Australia than "all the blacks that were ever here".

Cawood expressed his satisfaction with the outcome in his annual report for 1929, writing: "The evidence of all the witnesses was conclusive … the Board found that the shooting was justified, and that the natives killed were all members of the Walmulla [sic] tribe from Western Australia, who were on a marauding expedition, with the avowed object of wiping out the white settlers…"

Following his appointment, O'Kelly had stated his intention that the inquiry would not be a whitewash and it is speculated he had been "got at". To take up his appointment, O'Kelly travelled by train from Canberra to Melbourne with Prime Minister Stanley Bruce accompanying him. O'Kelly later said that had he known how the inquiry would turn out, he would have refused the appointment, stating that if the same circumstances happened again someone would be hanged for the killings.

Reporting on the inquiry, the Adelaide Register-News wrote: "he [Murray] is the hero of Central Australia. He is the policeman of fiction. He rides alone and always gets his man." The Northern Territory Times announced that the police were wholly exonerated, and that "there was not a scintilla of evidence" to support the view that the police had conducted a reprisal or punitive expedition.

== Aftermath ==
Constable William George Murray remained with the Northern Territory Police until the mid 1940s. He retired to Adelaide where he died in 1975. William Morton moved out of the area several years after the massacre. Bullfrog was never arrested and moved to Yuendumu where he died of old age in the 1970s.

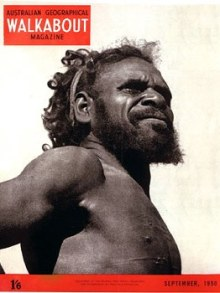
The Walkabout cover featuring One Pound Jimmy

One of the few survivors was Gwoya Jungarai, who left the area after the massacre destroyed his family. A later picture of him as One Pound Jimmy became an iconic Australian postage stamp.

Billy Stockman Tjapaltjarri, a prominent Papunya Tula painter, was a survivor of the massacre. His father was away hunting and survived while his mother had hidden him in a coolamon under a bush before being shot and killed. The strong oral history established after the massacre is recorded in paintings by some Indigenous artists and the Warlpiri, Anmatyerre and Kaytetye refer to the period as The Killing Times. Similarly, other massacres that have occurred in the Ord River region have been depicted by Warmun artists such as Rover Thomas.

== Seventy-fifth anniversary ==
Member of the Northern Territory Legislative Assembly, Jack Ah Kit in an adjournment debate on 9 October 2003 stated:

It must be remembered that the late 1920s was a time of major drought and therefore, in the context of what was still very much the frontier of black/white relations in Australia, the conflict over resources was intense. It was a conflict between the land and its people; and the cattle, and those who had brought with them the guns and diseases that followed. What is often misunderstood is that the Coniston Massacre was no single event, but a series of punitive raids that occurred over a number of weeks as police parties killed indiscriminately. Even Keith Windschuttle, one of the great deniers of frontier violence, acknowledges the savagery and disproportionate nature of the Coniston reprisals. Even he, albeit based only on the unsubstantiated writings of a journalist, agrees that many more died than the official record will admit.

The seventy-fifth anniversary of the massacre was commemorated on 24 September 2003 near Yuendumu organised by the Central Land Council.

== Documentary film ==
In 2012, a docu-drama film titled Coniston was released by PAW Productions and Screen Australia. It presented oral history and recollections of elderly Aboriginal people, including descendants of massacred victims. Directed by David Batty and Francis Jupurrurla Kelly, it was aired throughout Australia by ABC1 on 14 January 2013.

== See also ==
- List of massacres in Australia
- List of massacres of indigenous Australians
- Caledon Bay crisis

== Sources ==
- Attwood, B & Foster, S 2003 (eds) Frontier Conflict: The Australian Experience, National Museum of Australia
- Bradley, Michael (2019). Coniston. UWA Press.
- Briscoe, Gordon (2010). Racial Folly: A Twentieth-century Aboriginal Family. ANU E Press. ISBN 978-1-921-66621-6.
- Campbell, L. (2006) Darby: One hundred years of life in a changing culture. ABC Books.
- Cribbin, John (1984). The Killing Times. Fontana Books. ISBN 978-0-006-36583-9.
- Elder, Bruce (2003). Blood on the Wattle: Massacres and maltreatment of Aboriginal Australians since 1788. New Holland Publishers. ISBN 9781741100082.
- Kimber, R. G. (1986). Man from Arltunga. Hesperian Press.
- Marcus, A. (1990). Governing Savages. Allen & Unwin.
- Read, Peter; Read, Jay (1991). Long Time, Olden Time: Aboriginal accounts of Northern Territory history. Alice Springs: Institute for Aboriginal Development. ISBN 978-0-949-65958-3.
- Wilson, Bill; O'Brien, Justin (2003). "'To infuse an universal terror': a reappraisal of the Coniston killings" (PDF). Aboriginal History. 17: 59–78.
- "Yurrkuru-kurlu". Living Archive of Aboriginal Languages.
