= Coniston (Northern Territory) =

Cattle station in Northern Territory, Australia

Coordinates: 22°02′35″S 132°29′28″E

Location in Northern Territory

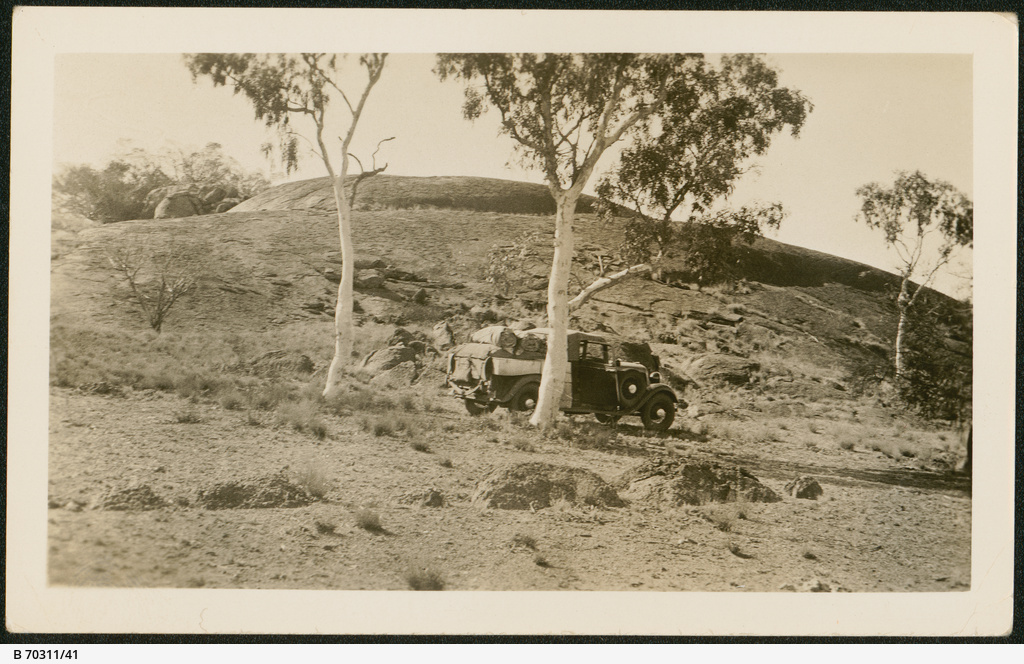
Laden vehicle near Coniston Station, c. 1935

Coniston is a cattle station in the Northern Territory of Australia in central Australia and is located about 250 kilometres north-west of Alice Springs.

Coniston is best known as the site of the Coniston massacre, which was the last known massacre of Indigenous Australians, in August 1928. Owing to a severe drought, the original owners (the Warlpiri, Anmatyerre, and Kaytetye people ) gravitated towards their ancient water sources, which the pastoralists were using for their livestock. Conflicts soon arose.

Coniston is still a working cattle station, and has been featured by the Northern Territory government for its introduction of a 6.4 kW solar power station. Developed in 1923 by Randall Stafford because of a sustainable water supply, the station still thrives today.

Coniston Station has been owned and managed by Max Lines and his wife Jacqui for more than three decades. In 2014, Max Lines found himself bedbound. With the help of her family and staff, Jacqui continued to run the property.

== See also ==
- List of ranches and stations
