= Laramba =

- Town
- Coordinates: 22°32′36″S 132°45′45″E
- Country: Australia
- State: Northern Territory

Population
  - Total: 239 (2016 census)
- Time zone: UTC+9:30 (ACST)
- Postcode: 0872

Laramba is a small town in the Northern Territory of Australia, around 205 km (127 mi) west of Alice Springs (2.5 hours by road). Access to the community is via the Napperby Station road.

In the 2016 Australian census, Laramba's population numbered 239. It lies within the Central Desert Regional Council LGA.

On 2 July 2013 the Federal Court of Australia sat at Laramba to recognise non-exclusive native title rights of the Anmatyerr and Arrernte people over land which includes Napperby Station, which continues to operate as a pastoral lease.

The Laramba Football Club, whose team is known as the Laramba Cowboys, play in the Central Australian Football League. The club has implemented a Domestic Violence Action Plan, which helps to educate the juniors about being positive male role models.
