= R. I. D. Mallam =

Judge of the Northern Territory Supreme Court

Ross Ibbotson Dalton Mallam (1878 – 26 May 1954), invariably known as R. I. D. Mallam or Justice Mallam, was a judge of the Australian Northern Territory Supreme Court.

== History ==
Mallam was born in Kensington, London, and in 1902 emigrated to Adelaide, South Australia, where his uncle George Bessant Mallam (1843–1910) was a successful medical practitioner who had in 1884 married Annie Isabel Kyffin Thomas (1864–1948), daughter of the influential newspaper proprietor William Kyffin Thomas (1821–1878).

He began practising law in Kadina in 1903, then a year later in Adelaide, where he also served as managing clerk for Paris Nesbit. On a motion by Nesbit, Mallam was admitted as a practitioner to the Supreme Court of South Australia.

In 1910 he moved to Darwin where he had a successful practice in Mitchell Street, having taken over the offices of E. P. G. Little. There he was a popular barrister and often took on 'the establishment' in court and he strongly opposed the administration of John A. Gilruth, whom he believed to be inept.

He was appointed to the Supreme Court of North Australia in April 1928, replacing the despised Judge Donald Arthur Roberts, and his appointment was celebrated by both the conservative Northern Territory Times and the union-owned Northern Standard. Of the appointment the Northern Territory Times said:

There seems to be a consensus of opinion locally that the appointment is a wise one and that Justice Mallam will fill the position with honor and credit to himself and with the general satisfaction to the public.

In November 1928 he sat on the trial of Padygar and Arkikra, two Aboriginal men who had been charged with the murder of Frederick Brooks at Coniston Station. It was this murder that led to the Coniston massacre and these men had been arrested by William George Murray who led the punitive expedition, when many Aboriginal people were killed. Mallam rejected the confessions of both men, which had been made after they were violently arrested, as inadmissible and they were found not guilty. Mallam is reported to have remarked during the trial that Murray had "[m]owed them down wholesale". The result of this trial led to the Commonwealth forming a Board of Inquiry into the events at Coniston.

He retired in 1933 due to ill health and his vacant position on the Supreme Court was filled by Thomas Alexander Wells. After a year in Adelaide he moved to Melbourne, where he died in 1954.

== Recognition ==
Mallam Street, Ludmilla is named for him. as is Mallam Crescent Alice Springs.
