= Barrow Creek Telegraph Station =

Station in the Northern Territory, Australia

- Location within Northern Territory
- Location: Northern Territory, Barrow Creek
- Coordinates: 21°31′46″S 133°53′23″E

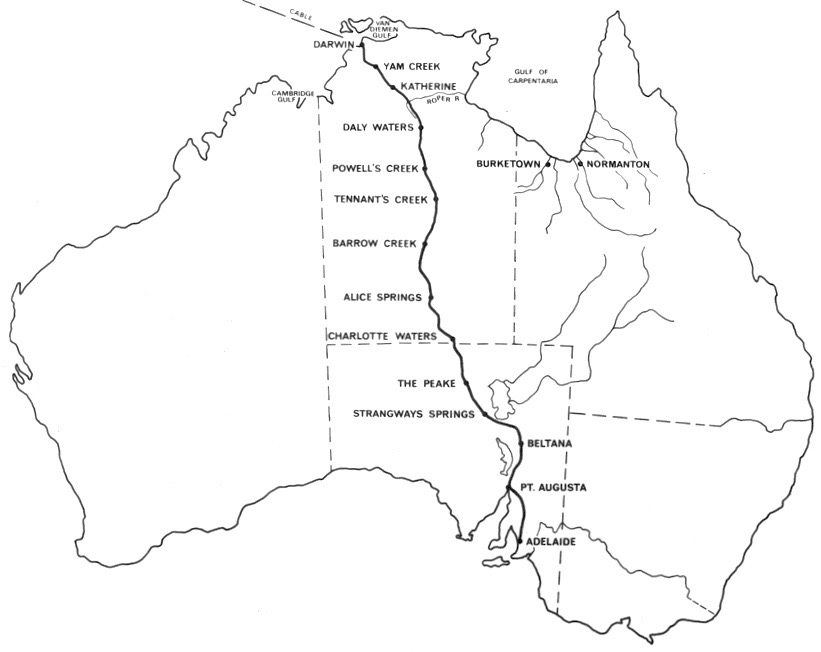
Australia's Overland Telegraph Line, c. 1940

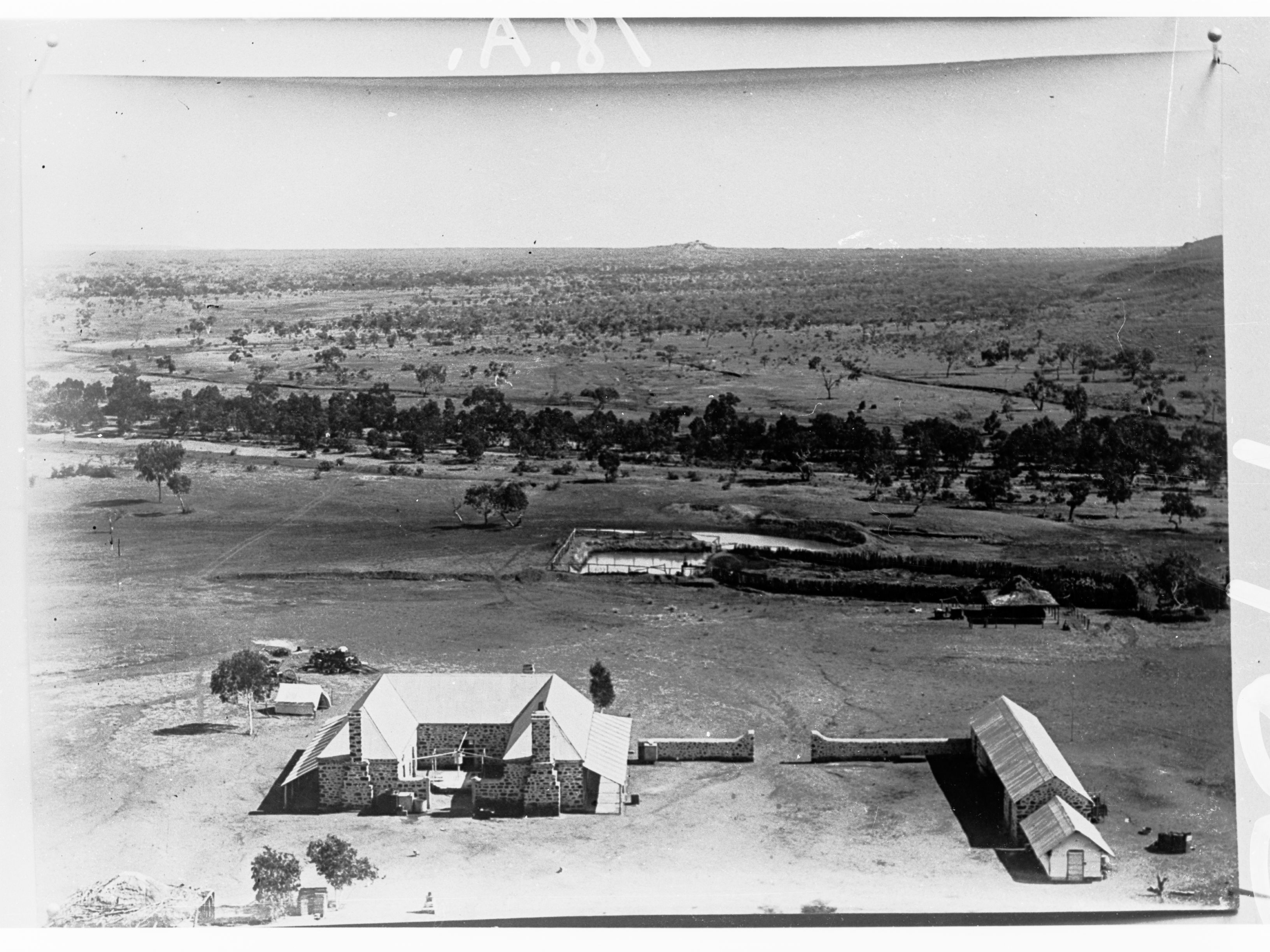
Barrow Creek Telegraph Station, c. 1895

Barrow Creek Telegraph Station was one of 12 repeater stations for the Australian Overland Telegraph Line and it sat between the Alice Springs Telegraph Station and Tennant Creek Telegraph Station.

It now sits within the Barrow Creek Telegraph Station Historical Reserve and was listed on the Northern Territory Heritage Register on 7 June 2002. It was previously registered on the Register of the National Estate on 26 April 1988.

In 2005 money was set aside by the Northern Territory Government to perform maintenance work on the stone buildings that remain there.

The traditional owners of this site are the Kaytetye people.

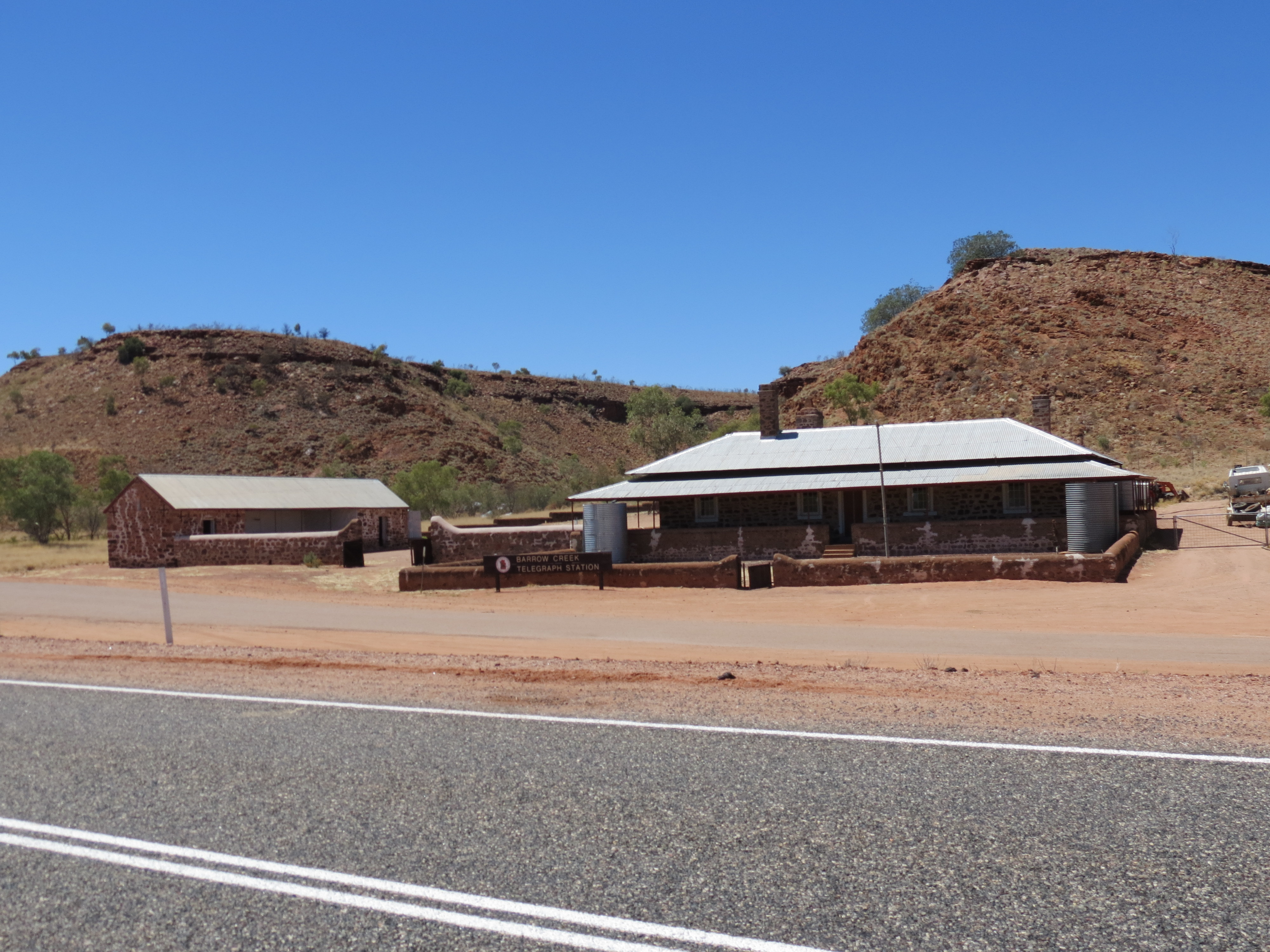
Barrow Creek Telegraph Station, 2014

== History ==
The site of the Barrow Creek Telegraph Station was selected by John Ross, in 1871, during his Overland Telegraph exploring party which followed on from more general exploration undertaken by John McDouall Stuart. The site was selected due to the supposed availability of water and the poling and wiring of the area was completed in the same year. By January 1872 work had also completed the construction of a small stone hut and had begun constructing the Telegraph Station itself.

The Telegraph Station was officially opened by the Post Master General Charles Todd, who was travelling through the area, on 16 August 1872.

In 1873 approximately 5,000 sheep were overlanded by Alfred Giles to stock the Telegraph Stations along the line and, at Barrow Creek, Kaytetye people speared some of the sheep and horses. This resulted in the construction of a police station in the Telegraph Station complex and the first mounted constable stationed there was Samuel Gason.

Buildings continued to be constructed at the Telegraph Station until the 1880s and many of these buildings remain intact at the site. These included an elaborate stone fence (designed to fortify the station), a wagon shed and a blacksmith's hut. The Telegraph Station also has its own cemetery, which is known to have three graves.

The Telegraph Station ceased operation in 1935 when the line ceased carrying international traffic, following the establishment of the Pacific and Indian Ocean cables but it remained in use by the police station.

In 1941, during World War II, the Telegraph Station became a telephone repeater station to ensure that Army personnel could communicate throughout the Northern Territory and, from May 1942, Army unit were stationed there and it became a staging camp for Army convoys.

In 1975 the station was transferred to Telcom Australia (Telstra) until it was made redundant in 1980.

== Massacres at the site ==
In 1873 and 1874 the Telegraph Station was the site of two massacres, known as the Barrow Creek massacres.

=== July 1873 ===
The first of these massacres was when staff at the station "dispersed" local Kaytetye peoples with the use of firearms and which resulted in the death of approximately 30 people. It appears that Telegraph Station staff wired Charles Todd days before asking to disperse people but that, not receiving a reply they decided that the request had not been whether they were allowed but for approval to do it "at public expense".

=== February to April 1874 ===
The second of these massacres took place after Kaytetye men attacked the Telegraph Station and killed stationmaster James Stapleton and linesman John Franks (both buried in the cemetery) and a number of others were injured; this was likely in response to the earlier massacre and accusations that European men had been abducting Aboriginal women and girls. In reprisal mounted constable Samuel Gason carried out four punitive expeditions with volunteers from throughout the region into the surrounding country. The official number of people killed in these attacks was reported as being 11 but a much higher death toll has been estimated at between 50 and 90 people and likely higher. The death toll was not only made up of Kaytetye people but also included Anmatyerre, Warumungu, Alyawarre and Warlpiri people.
