= Victor Carrington =

Australian politician

Victor George Carrington

Government Resident of Central Australia
- In office 11 December 1929 – 12 June 1931
- Preceded by: John C. Cawood
- Succeeded by: Position abolished

Victor George Carrington was an Australian administrator. He was the second and last Government Resident of Central Australia, the short lived Territory of Australia which re-merged with the Territory of North Australia in 1931 to form the Northern Territory.

Following the reunification Carrington was designated as Deputy Administrator, based in Alice Springs, until he was again re-designated to being a District Officer in 1937.

In 1934 Carrington was instrumental in prosecuting Gordon Keith Freeman, the superintendent at The Bungalow, for rape.
