= The Residency, Alice Springs =

Coordinates: 23.698701°S 133.88212°E

The Residency
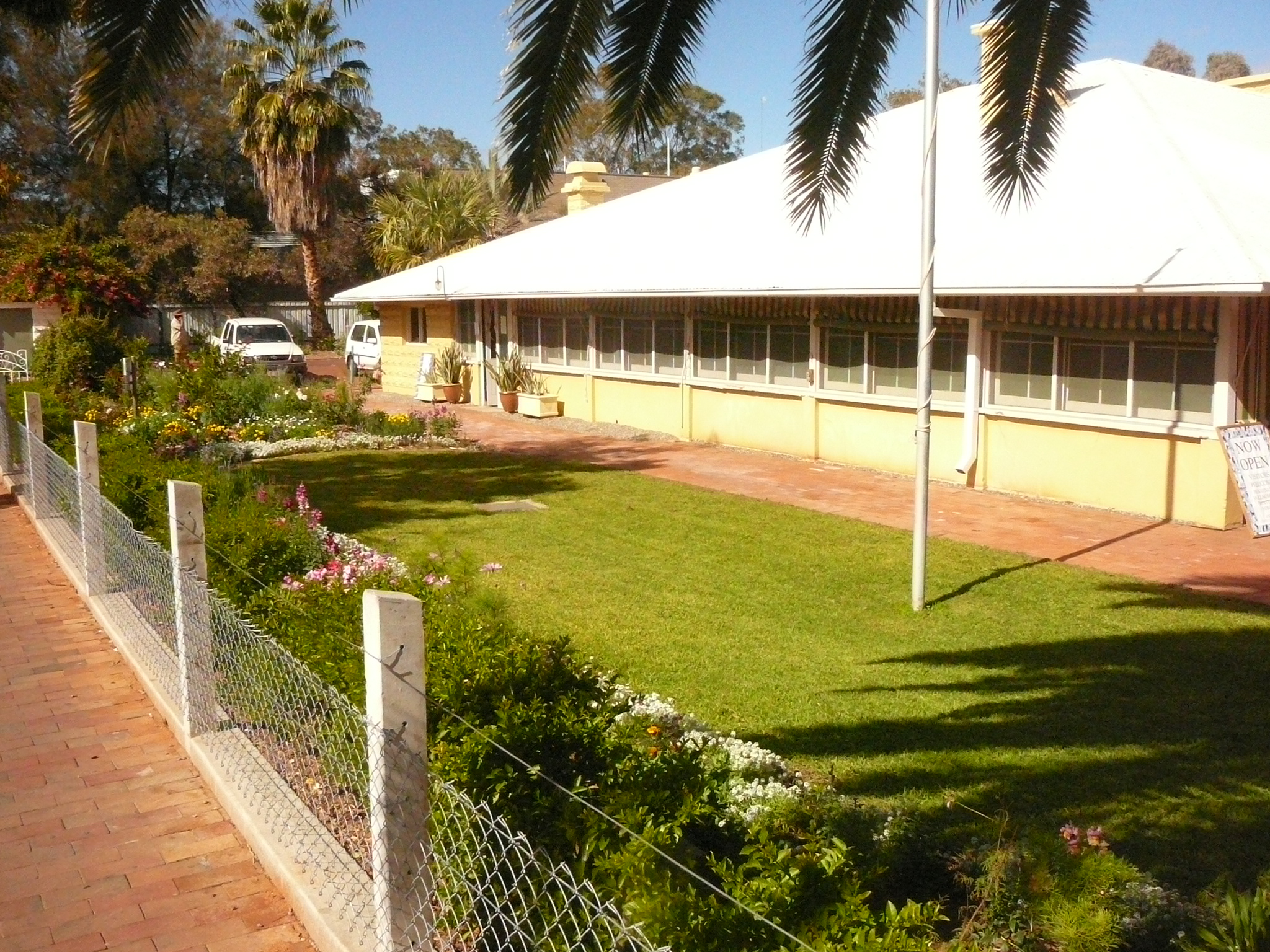
- A view of the Parsons Street side of The Residency, 2007
- Interactive map of the The Residency area

General information
- Location: Alice Springs, Northern Territory, Australia
- Construction started: 1926
- Completed: 1927

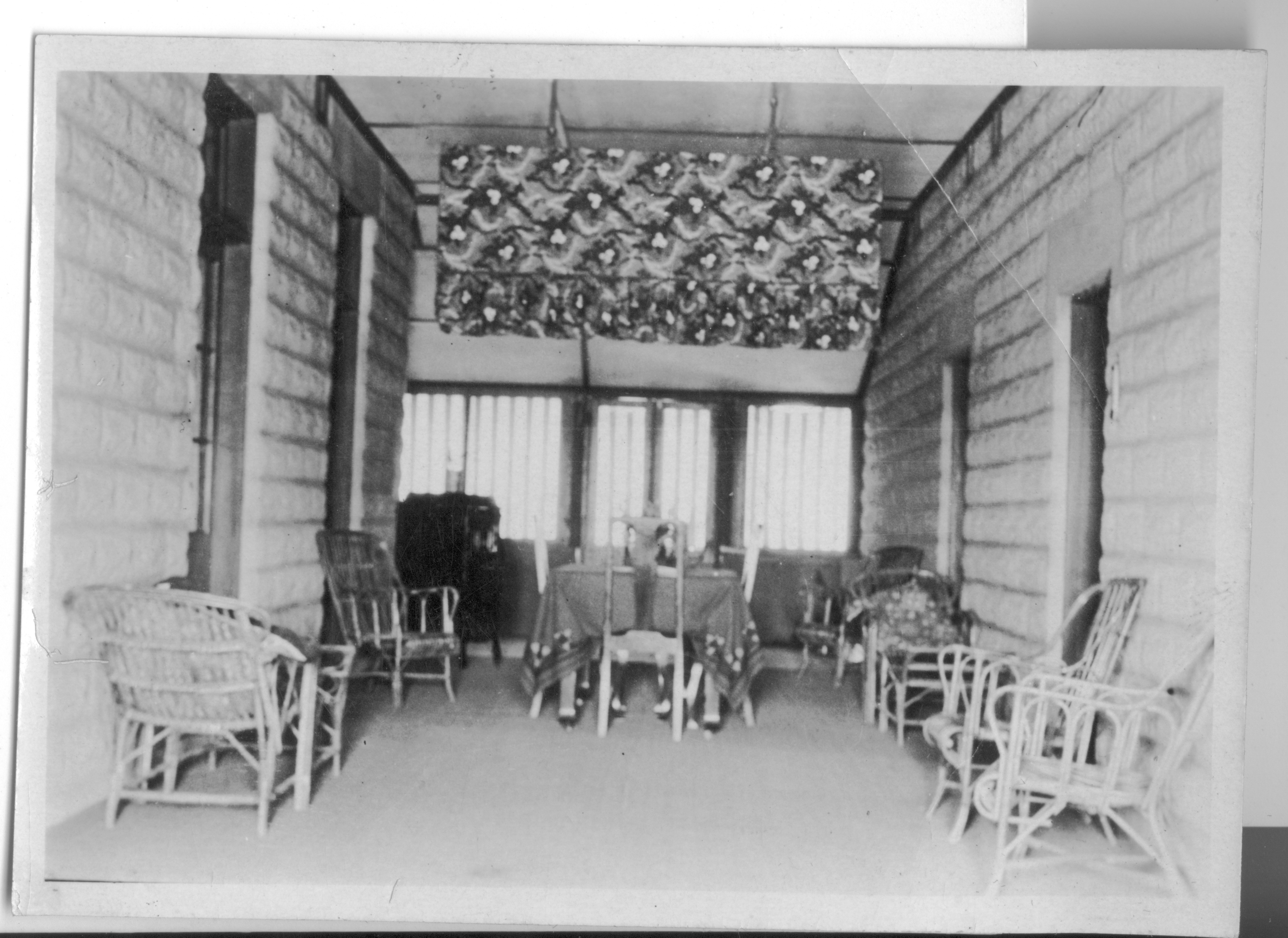
The living space at The Residency, showing the punkah used to cool the room, in the late 1920s

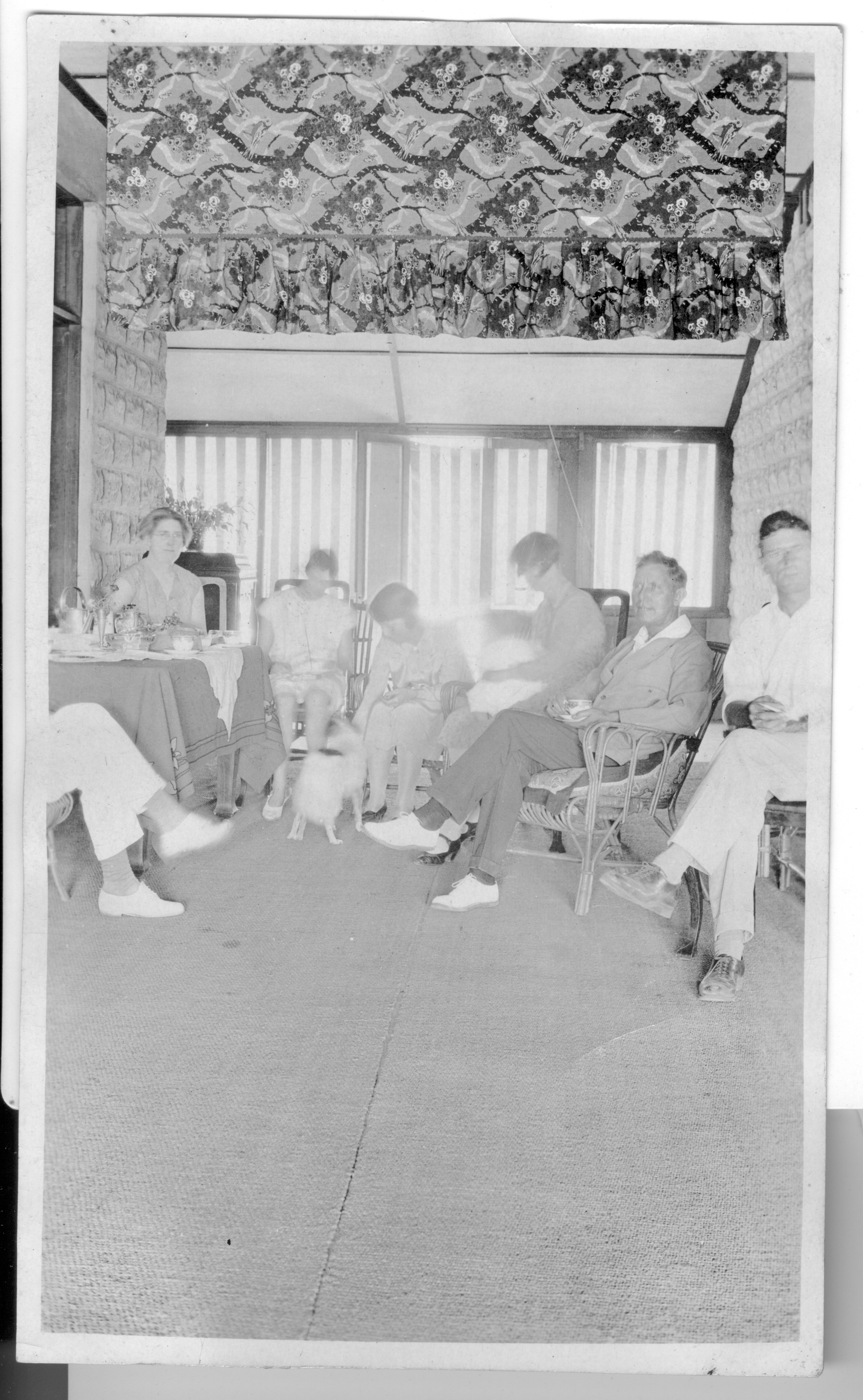
People seated in the Living Space at The Residency, Alice Springs, in the late 1920s

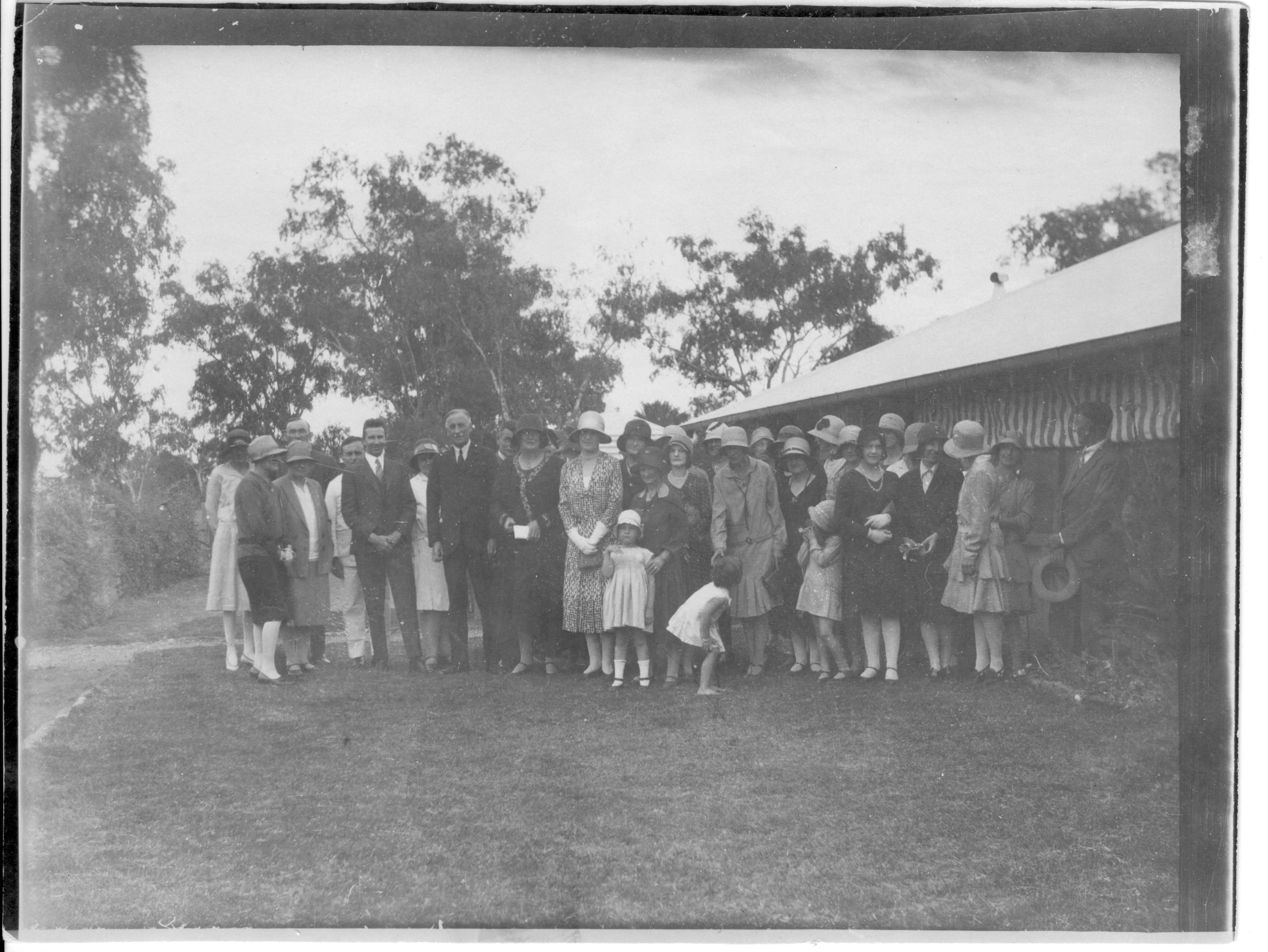
A group standing in front The Residency, 1938

The Residency is a historic one-storey house located in Alice Springs, Australia. The building holds significance for the people of Alice Springs as a tangible symbol of their brief legislative independence from the rest of the Northern Territory. It also provided a hub of social and cultural activities for the local residents.

John Charles Cawood was appointed Government Resident of Central Australia in 1926 and was to be based at the capital, Stuart (as Alice Springs was formerly known).

== Description ==
The Residency was one of a type of house designed for an arid climate. The building had foundations, but the concrete floors were laid directly onto the earth. The hollow concrete bricks, which resembled stone, were made on site in wooden sculpted moulds. Only one type of brick was actually used, but was concealed by a varied laying pattern. Cawood telegraphed the Department of Home and Territories pointing out that sand suitable for cement could be found in the Todd River. The building was completed in 1927.

The main feature of the building was a breezeway running through the centre of the house. This area was mainly used as the lounge in the earlier days. It was fitted out with cane furniture and a tea table. The main hall was cooled by a punkah (which is still in use today) and was operated by an Aboriginal servant. Rooms opened off each side of the breezeway and a wide fly-wired veranda enclosed the building. Today the veranda is enclosed by wooden framed sliding opaque windows. There are green striped canvas blinds to keep the building cool.

The Residency has undergone some major renovations during its occupation as a home. The front room to the left of the entrance was originally the laundry and storeroom. Mrs Carrington (occupied the Residency from 1929–1942) often had to vacate her bedroom when accommodating married couples and this became undesirable. It had been suggested to build two extra rooms onto the back of the house out from the kitchen – one being a storeroom and the other being a laundry. This allowed a new bedroom to be completed for the occupants of The Residency. The new bedroom thrilled Mrs Carrington because the morning sun streamed through the windows.

The main breezeway (jokingly called 'the freezeway' during the winter) later became a dining area. With the different families living in The Residency this area often changed to suit the occupants.

There were 4 fireplaces – one in each of the main rooms. Doors opened onto the veranda to keep the house warm in winter and cool in summer. Alice Springs can be very cold during the winter and of course extremely hot in the summer.

== Occupants ==
John Charles Cawood was the Government Resident from February 1927 until December 1929. Even though Cawood was the Administrator, he was also put in charge of the three-member Commission of Inquiry in 1928. Mr Cawood handed over his position to his deputy as Mrs Cawood was suffering from poor health.

Victor Carrington occupied The Residency as the Assistant administrator (this position was abolished with the repealing of the North Australia Act, 1926 in 1931) and later as District Officer. The Carrington family lived at the Residency from 1929 until 1942.

Aubrey Abbott was the Administrator of the Northern Territory and was living in Darwin. After almost being killed during the Bombing of Darwin in 1942, he moved the Administrative Centre from Darwin to Alice Springs, and Mr Abbott remained at the Residency until November 1945.

LH A Giles was then the Government Secretary of the Northern Territory and he stayed in The Residency for a very short time just until May 1946.

Colonel Lionel Rose was a very 'colourful character' and many stories were told of his bushcraft and love of life. Colonel Rose was the Chief Veterinary for the Northern Territory. The locals have suggested that The Residency was a focal point in the social life of the community while Colonel Rose occupied it from July 1946 until February 1955.

Reginald McCaffery, his wife Billie and his large family followed Colonel Rose. McCaffery found the number of bedrooms inadequate. He organised some internal partitions on the veranda to accommodate his family and these areas were furnished quite plainly, in some cases just a bed, chair and table. Reginald McCaffery lived in The Residency from February 1955 until December 1960.

Dan Conway with his wife Jillna was the last District Officer to occupy the building before it was handed over to the Museums and Art Galleries of the Northern Territory. The Conways undertook fairly extensive renovations for the Royal Visit to Central Australia in 1963. Queen Elizabeth II and the Duke of Edinburgh slept in The Residency for 2 nights (14–16 March). To accommodate the Royal Party a new roof, air conditioning and the installation of two new bathrooms were added. Part of the veranda near the Queens bedroom was a private area for the Queen to read her daily correspondence and the programme for daily events. The Conways lived at The Residency from December 1960 until July 1973.

When Alice Springs became a municipality in 1973, the Museum and Art Gallery of the Northern Territory assumed control and used the historic building to display items of art, natural science and local history.

The Residency was re-opened by the Chief Minister of the NT, Shane Stone, on 9 February 1996, and is now the home of Heritage Alice Springs Inc. Open to the public, visitors can experience the atmosphere of the gracious home which was the social, administrative and vice-regal hub of the early township of Alice Springs.

== Heritage listings ==
The Residency was listed on the Northern Territory Heritage Register on 14 July 1995. In 1987, it was listed on the now-defunct Register of the National Estate.

Mosaic sign in front of the Residency, created by Leonie Henry, a long-time resident of Alice Springs

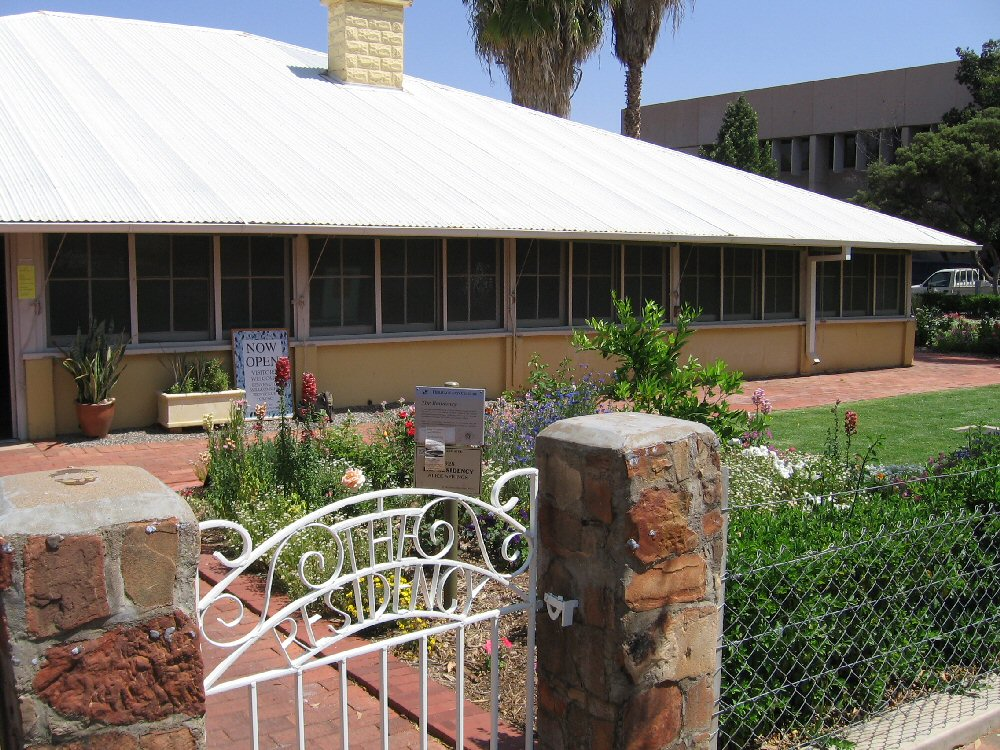
A view from the front of the Residency

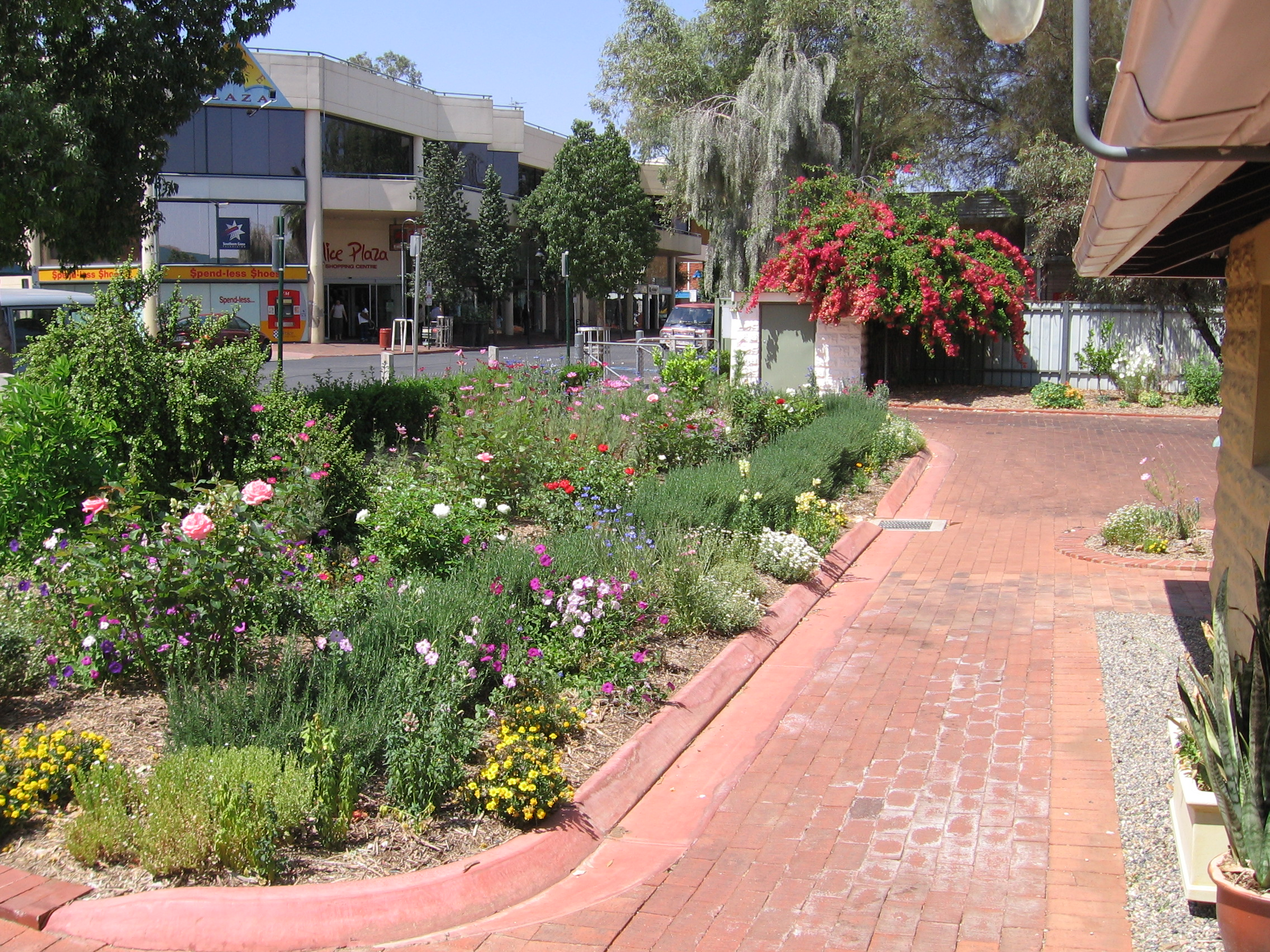
More of the garden

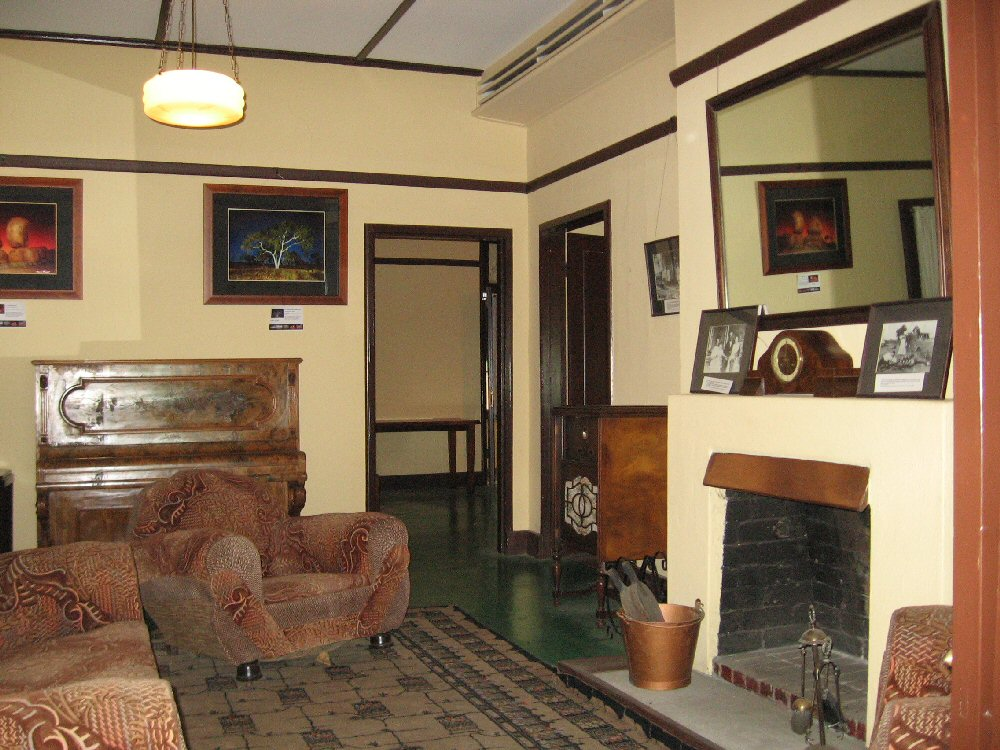
One of the original living rooms
