= Samuel Gason =

Samuel Simco Gason (2 June 1845, Adelaide–11 Apr 1897, Gibsons Camp) was an early settler of the Flinders Ranges described as having had a colourful contribution to early South Australian history.

Mount Gason on the Northern Territory/South Australian Border is named after him.

== Works ==
- "The Dieyerie Tribe" in The Native Tribes of South Australia (1879)
