= William George Murray =

Australian police officer (1884–1975)

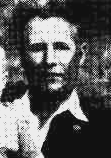
Constable William George Murray, c. 1930

William George Murray (1884 – 2 December 1975) was a constable in the Northern Territory Police force who, in 1928, led a series of punitive expeditions against Aboriginal Australians that became known as the Coniston massacre.

== Early life ==
Murray was born near the small rural town of Yarck in the British colony of Victoria in 1884. His father was a local farmer by the name of William Henry Murray who was married to Mary Jane Mills. He grew up on the "Horton Vale" family farm near Yarck where he remained until around 1910 when Murray and his parents moved to the inner Melbourne suburb of Northcote. They lived at 62 Waterloo Road in Northcote.

== First World War ==
In 1914, at the age of thirty, Murray enlisted as a soldier in the First Australian Imperial Force to fight in World War I. He was assigned to the 4th Light Horse Regiment and was shipped out to Egypt in October 1914. He later fought in the Gallipoli campaign where he was wounded twice. In a letter to his parents, Murray described his participation in the battles at Gallipoli during August 1915. Murray wrote about how the advancing Turks were mowed down with machine gun and artillery fire and how it was "great fun and very exciting." He also recounted the occasions in which he was nearly killed and described an incident in which he was shot in the shoulder. Due to this wound, Murray was evacuated from Gallipoli by ship and sent to a military hospital in Malta. Murray later returned to Gallipoli where he was promoted to lance corporal. In December 1915, he was transferred to the Western Front and again promoted to sergeant. He remained at the front until the end of the war and was wounded twice more. In October 1918, Murray was shipped back to Australia and he was discharged from the military forces in March 1919.

== Northern Territory Police ==
=== Early postings ===
In April 1919, Murray joined the Northern Territory Police as a constable and was posted to the very remote Ranken River police station on the Barkly Tableland. He received no formal training and in the following years was transferred to several outposts around the Territory. He was involved in capturing Aboriginal Australians who were killing the stock of Anglo-Australians who ran cattle stations in the region. Murray would either chain those he captured and escort them for judicial hearings in larger settlements such as Alice Springs or he would hand out summary punishment as he saw fit.

In 1926, Murray was transferred to the Barrow Creek police station where he was given the additional title of Protector of Aborigines for the immediate region around Barrow Creek.

=== Coniston massacre ===
In August 1928, Murray was ordered to investigate the killing of a white man named Fred Brooks who was allegedly bludgeoned to death by several Aboriginal people at a waterhole to the west of Coniston cattle station near the modern-day settlement of Yuendumu. Murray led a punitive expedition from Coniston which resulted in the deaths of at least 17 mostly Warlpiri people. He took two survivors, named Akirkra and Padygar, as prisoners to the holding jail at Alice Springs. In early September, Murray went on another police mission to arrest Aboriginal cattle killers around the Coniston and Barrow Creek areas. An unknown number of Aboriginal people were possibly killed during this expedition with a further two Aboriginal prisoners, named Ned and Barney, taken to Alice Springs. From late September until mid October, Murray conducted a third punitive expedition to the north of Coniston along the Lander and Hanson Rivers. This last mission was in response to an attack on William "Nugget" Morton by Aboriginal people. Morton participated with Murray in this expedition where at least a further 14 Warlpiri and Kaytetye people were shot dead. No prisoners were taken in this phase. These combined killings conducted by Murray came to be known as the Coniston massacre. Officially, 31 men, women and children were killed during this police operation, although analysis of the existing documentation and surviving Aboriginal testimonies indicate that somewhere between 100 and 200 people were shot dead.

Of the four Aboriginal prisoners, Ned and Barney were sentenced at Alice Springs and served one month in the jail there for the spearing of cattle. Murray escorted the other two prisoners, Akirkra and Padygar, to Darwin to face trial for the killing of Fred Brooks. At this trial, conducted in November 1928, Murray freely gave evidence to the presiding judge that he shot a large number of Aboriginal people during the operation, that he shot to kill and shot dead wounded Aboriginal people. The judge (Justice Mallam) noted that Murray "mowed them down wholesale". The actual evidence against Akirkra and Padygar for killing Brooks was weak and they were acquitted. Murray's admissions in court however led to widespread publicity about the massacres and a governmental Board of Inquiry was set up to investigate his actions.

The Board of Inquiry which ran from late December 1928 until the end of January 1929 was a whitewash set up to protect Murray and the colonial system in the Northern Territory. The board found that Murray and the other perpetrators of the massacres acted in self defence and that the shootings were justified. It found that the Aboriginal people themselves were to blame and that more police patrols would be required to instil control upon the surviving Indigenous population. The board suggested that Murray should have more police training but this was never done.

=== The Willaberta Jack arrest ===
Soon after the Board of Inquiry was finished, Murray was again out arresting Aboriginal people. In February 1929, he was ordered to track down an Aboriginal man named Willaberta Jack, who had shot dead a white man named Harry Henty. By late June, Murray had arrested Willaberta Jack and returned with him to Alice Springs. While Willaberta Jack was jailed there, Murray gave him a severe beating for which Murray was later fined £5. Murray later escorted Jack to Darwin for trial where he was acquitted of murdering Henty. However, Willaberta Jack died in police custody not long after his acquittal.

David Tranter's 2007 short film Willaberta Jack tells the story of his great-uncle, and Warwick Thornton's acclaimed 2017 featre film, Sweet Country, built on this story.

=== Arltunga ===
Around 1931, Murray was transferred to Arltunga about 100 km east of Alice Springs. Here he was also appointed as a gold warden in charge of the goldfields in the area. He took prospecting leases out for himself and also demanded Aboriginal people bring him samples of gold in return for the government rations that he was supposed to hand out to them. There is also a suggestion that Murray participated in another massacre or mass poisoning of Aboriginal Australians at the nearby Sandover River while he was posted at Arltunga.

In 1933, he was interviewed at Arltunga by the famous novelist Ernestine Hill where he again boasted of the various ways he had killed numerous Aboriginal people. Hill glorified Murray's actions in a resultant newspaper article regarding the interview.

In 1936, he was given a further title of health inspector in the Arltunga area. However, in 1937 he was investigated for the alleged illegal selling of government property. Murray faced a heated court hearing where the charges against him were eventually dismissed. He was soon transferred away from Arltunga.

=== Later postings ===
Murray was transferred to the Roper River in 1938 and then to Brock's Creek in the same year. In 1940, at the age of 56, he was transferred to Darwin, where he remained a constable in the police force until 1945. In this year his title of Protector of Aborigines was terminated and he left the Northern Territory to retire to Adelaide in the state of South Australia.

== Family and later life ==
William George Murray married Edith Esme Bligh in Melbourne in 1931. They had one son together, whom they named Eric. Murray's young family moved with him to Arltunga and remained with him during his later postings in the Northern Territory. When he retired to Adelaide, Murray worked as a caretaker at the Malvern Methodist Church in the Adelaide suburb of St Peters. This church was burnt down by an arsonist soon after Murray took up the caretaker position. He and his wife lived in a cottage nearby on Harrow Road.

== Death and legacy ==
William George Murray died on 2 December 1975 at the age of 91. Murray is remembered as the main perpetrator of probably the worst mass killing in Australia since the Federation of Australia.
