= Barrow Creek, Northern Territory =

Locality in the Northern Territory, Australia

Barrow Creek
- Town
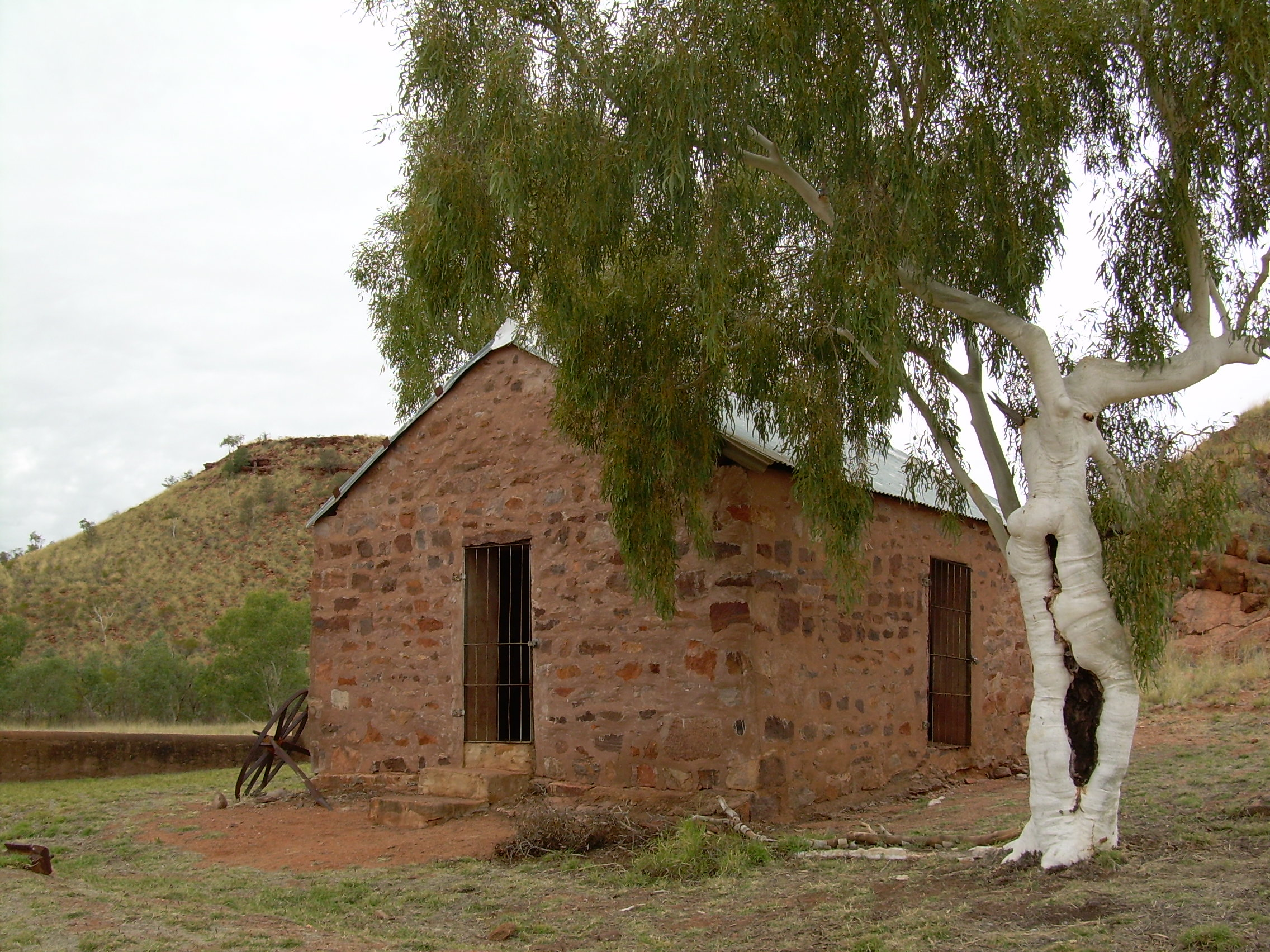
- Hut at Barrow Creek

- Coordinates: 21°31′55″S 133°53′20″E
- Country: Australia
- State: Northern Territory

Population
  - Total: 4 (2016)

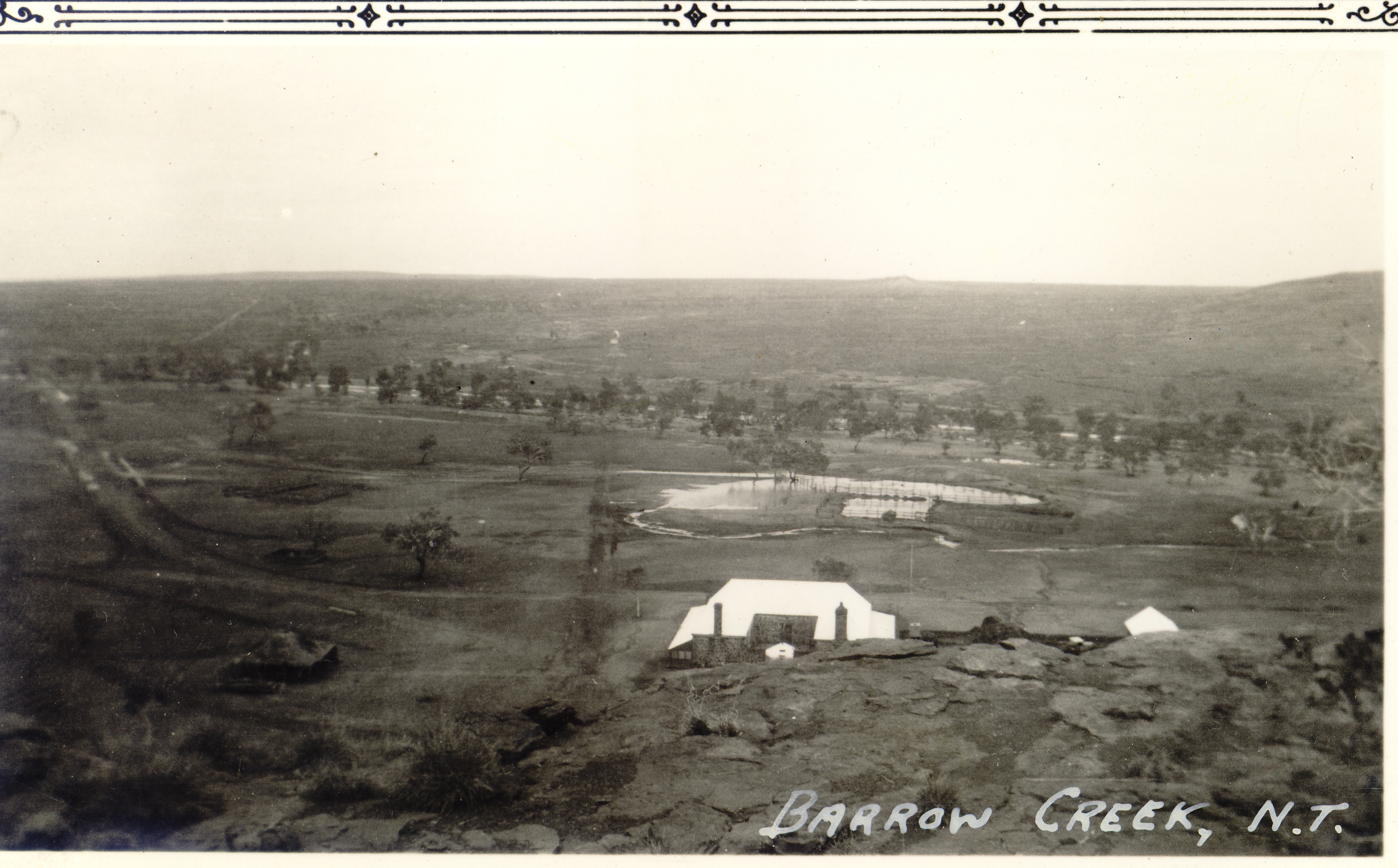
Barrow Creek, 1938 - 1948

Barrow Creek in 1946

Barrow Creek is a very small town, with a current population of 11, in the southern Northern Territory of Australia. It is located on the Stuart Highway, about 280 km north of Alice Springs, about halfway from there to Tennant Creek. The main feature of the town is the roadhouse/hotel. A number of mining companies are currently exploring in the area, although none of the current residents are involved in the mining industry.

== History ==
=== Indigenous people ===
The Barrow Creek area is the traditional home of the Kaytetye Aboriginal people. Humans have lived in Australia, and perhaps this area, for at least 40,000 years. Their ownership of this land is recognised through the Aboriginal Land Rights (Northern Territory) Act 1976 on 1 January 2002.

=== European settlement ===
With the arrival of Europeans in the latter part of the 19th century, settlers competed with the Kaytetye for land and resources. Cultural misunderstandings on land and property rights resulted in mutual killings.

John McDouall Stuart passed through the area in 1860. Stuart named a creek near the current town after John Henry Barrow, a preacher, journalist and politician who was born in England in 1817 and migrated to South Australia in 1853. At the time of first European habitation of the site, he was the Treasurer of South Australia.

=== Barrow Creek Telegraph Station ===
Barrow Creek was chosen as a site for an Overland Telegraph morse repeater station by John Ross in September 1871. The station was officially opened on 16 August 1872 by Charles Todd. For more information see: Barrow Creek Telegraph Station.

=== Arrival of graziers in the area ===
In 1873, 5,000 sheep were overlanded from Adelaide by Alfred Giles for distribution to telegraph stations along the line. During 1877 and 1878, Alfred and Arthur Giles overlanded stock for W. J. Browne to the Katherine River. On the 1878 journey Frank Withall, a young Englishman, was included on the suggestion of Browne to gather some colonial experience. Alfred Giles later started Springvale, Delamere and the Newcastle Waters runs.

=== World War II ===
During World War II, Barrow Creek was used by the Australian Army as a staging camp for convoys of troops and supplies, which was known as No. 5 Australian Personnel Staging Camp. It was the first overnight stop on the northern trip from Alice Springs to Birdum.

=== Water limits Barrow Creek population ===
Barrow Creek has always had a problem with both quantity and quality of groundwater supplies. This problem was already recognised in the 1870s, and only 20 years after the Telegraph Station was built there is evidence of plans to shift it about 40 kilometres further north to the crossing at Taylor Creek because of better groundwater supplies. There is still a bore at that locality called New Barrow Bore. Today, the only good water at Barrow Creek is rainwater and that is limited due to the arid climate.

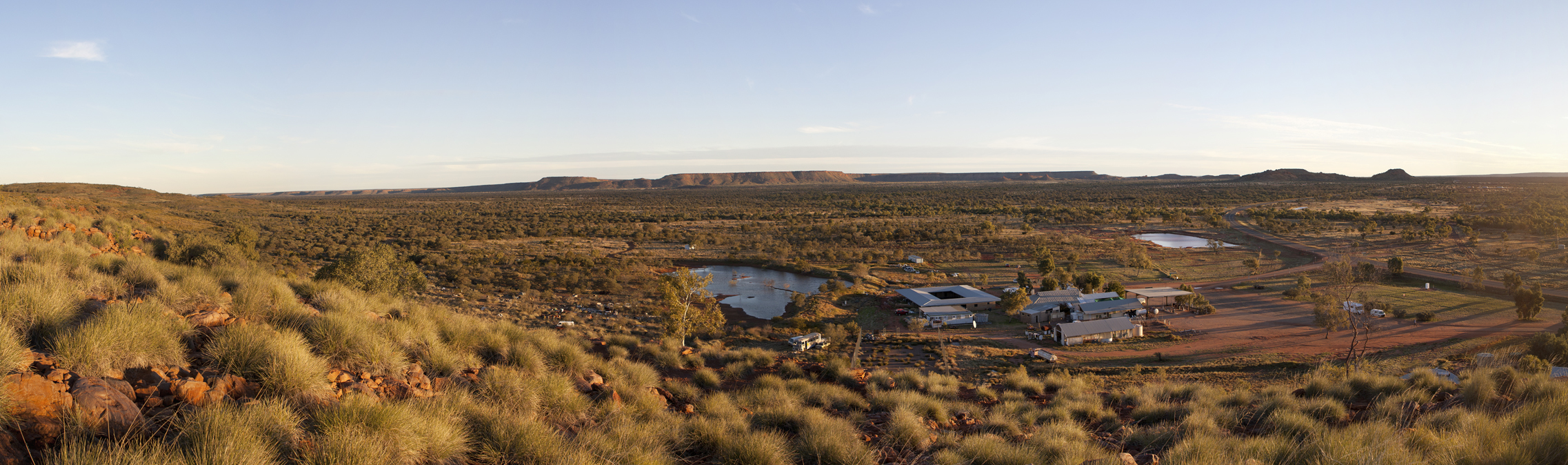
Panorama from the Barrow Creek Road House

== Crime ==
=== 1870 killing ===
During 1870 some 3,000 sheep from the Lake Hope area in South Australia were overlanded to the Northern Territory, for the men working on the line at Roper River, by Ralph and John Milner. Near Wauchope Creek 900 sheep died after eating poisonous herbs. John Milner was killed by some Aboriginal people and Ralph arrived at the Roper River with only 1,000 sheep.

=== 1874 Barrow Creek outrage and aftermath ===
On 22 February 1874, a group of Kaytetye men attacked the Barrow Creek Telegraph Station, whose staff were relaxing outside the compound, immediately killing linesman John Frank, mortally wounding Canadian telegraphist and stationmaster James Lawrence Stapleton (died on the following day) and injuring several others. A monument was erected at Barrow Creek to their memory (the spelling "Franks" is almost certainly incorrect). Contemporary press reports described the incident as the "Barrow's Creek outrage".

On orders from Adelaide, police trooper Samuel Gason recruited a group of volunteers to apprehend the perpetrators. Several Aboriginal people were killed in two separate battles over the two months that followed, with Gason reporting that some of the dead had been identified as having taken part in the 'outrage'. It is estimated that between 50 - 90, although possibly more Kaytetye, Anmatyerre, Warumungu, Alyawarre and Warlpiri people were killed.

Anthropologist Ted Strehlow reported in 1932 that Alex Ross, who'd visited the area in 1875, doubted whether the real culprits had been found. "Well of course nobody ever knew," Ross was quoted as saying.

=== 1928 Coniston Massacre ===
Barrow Creek was central to the last major Aboriginal massacre in the Northern Territory. In the 1920s Mounted Constable William George Murray was in charge of the local police station and also the Chief Protector of Aborigines in the area. When an old dingo trapper, Fred Brooks, was killed by Aboriginal people on Coniston Station, Murray led a posse which killed an estimated 70 Aboriginal people in a series of bloody reprisals. When Murray was called to Darwin to explain his actions he was greeted as a conquering hero. When asked why he had taken no prisoners he expressed the racist attitudes which prevailed at the time by telling the Darwin court "What use is a wounded black feller a hundred miles from civilisation?" He was exonerated of all charges.

=== 2001 murder of Peter Falconio ===
Barrow Creek is close to where Peter Falconio went missing, murdered by Bradley John Murdoch, and Joanne Lees was abducted. The scene of the crime was 13 kilometres north of Barrow Creek. No body has been found. An AU$500,000 reward remains on offer for information that leads to the discovery of Falconio's body.

== Tourist spots ==
=== The graves ===
The graves are marked by a wall around the graves and headstones. They are well looked after. In a small graveyard at the front are remains of two telegraph station workers killed in a surprise attack by Aboriginals in 1874.

=== The pub ===
The old pub was built in 1926 by Joe Kilgariff, uncle of Northern Territory senator Bernie Kilgariff, and it still has the original old bar, underground cellar and tin ceilings. There is accommodation outside and rooms inside and a caravan park. On the wall in the kitchen of the building is a cartoon of two Australian comic icons, Bluey and Curley, drawn by the artist John Gurney when he passed through during World War II.

=== Telegraph Station ===
For many years the telegraph station was the home of Tom Roberts, a linesman from Charters Towers who lived in the building and repaired breakdowns of the line. Now deceased, a corner of the hotel is devoted to his memory.

== Popular culture ==
Part of the Graham Masterton novel ‘’Lords of the Air’’ is set in Barrow Creek.

== Climate ==
Climate data for Barrow Creek, elevation 511 m (1,677 ft), (1971–1987 normals, extremes 1964–1988)
Month	Jan	Feb	Mar	Apr	May	Jun	Jul	Aug	Sep	Oct	Nov	Dec	Year
Record high °C (°F)	44.5 (112.1)	43.7 (110.7)	40.6 (105.1)	37.9 (100.2)	34.8 (94.6)	31.0 (87.8)	31.0 (87.8)	35.1 (95.2)	36.7 (98.1)	40.7 (105.3)	42.5 (108.5)	43.6 (110.5)	44.5 (112.1)
Mean daily maximum °C (°F)	36.8 (98.2)	35.4 (95.7)	33.4 (92.1)	29.7 (85.5)	25.6 (78.1)	22.5 (72.5)	22.5 (72.5)	25.9 (78.6)	29.2 (84.6)	33.2 (91.8)	35.4 (95.7)	37.5 (99.5)	30.6 (87.1)
Mean daily minimum °C (°F)	23.9 (75.0)	23.3 (73.9)	21.2 (70.2)	17.2 (63.0)	12.6 (54.7)	9.1 (48.4)	8.1 (46.6)	10.7 (51.3)	14.4 (57.9)	18.4 (65.1)	21.5 (70.7)	23.6 (74.5)	17.0 (62.6)
Record low °C (°F)	13.2 (55.8)	14.6 (58.3)	9.9 (49.8)	7.5 (45.5)	2.3 (36.1)	−1.1 (30.0)	−0.4 (31.3)	−0.5 (31.1)	3.3 (37.9)	6.2 (43.2)	9.3 (48.7)	11.1 (52.0)	−1.1 (30.0)
Average rainfall mm (inches)	93.7 (3.69)	112.3 (4.42)	42.5 (1.67)	6.0 (0.24)	18.5 (0.73)	7.9 (0.31)	7.8 (0.31)	1.6 (0.06)	18.5 (0.73)	14.5 (0.57)	32.0 (1.26)	79.1 (3.11)	434.4 (17.1)
Average rainy days (≥ 1.0 mm)	4.9	5.1	2.3	0.8	1.4	1.0	0.6	0.3	1.8	2.2	3.8	5.5	29.7
Source: Australian Bureau of Meteorology (rain 1991-2016)

== Current ==
=== Population ===
The population of Barrow Creek at the moment is four people who work at the roadhouse and nearby Aboriginal camp caretaker yard. There are two Aboriginal communities - the Tara community which is 12 km northeast and Pmatajunata at Stirling Station which is about 35 km from Barrow Creek. There are about 120 people there and 80 people at Tara.

=== Mining ===
- On 19 March 2001 Glengarry Resources were issued with an exploration licence for tantalite in Barrow Creek.
- On 17 November 2003 Barrow Creek Central Land Council agreed to allow Newmont and Normandy NFM to use an area north-west of Barrow Creek for exploration and mining for a period of 20 years.
- On 26 May 2005 BHP Billiton commenced drilling at Barrow Creek to explore and develop nickel sulphide deposits.

== See also ==
- List of massacres of Indigenous Australians
