= John C. Cawood =

Australian politician (1872–1962)

John Charles Cawood

Government Resident of Central Australia
- In office 15 December 1926 – 11 December 1929
- Preceded by: Position established
- Succeeded by: Victor Carrington

Personal details
- Relations: Stan Cawood (son)

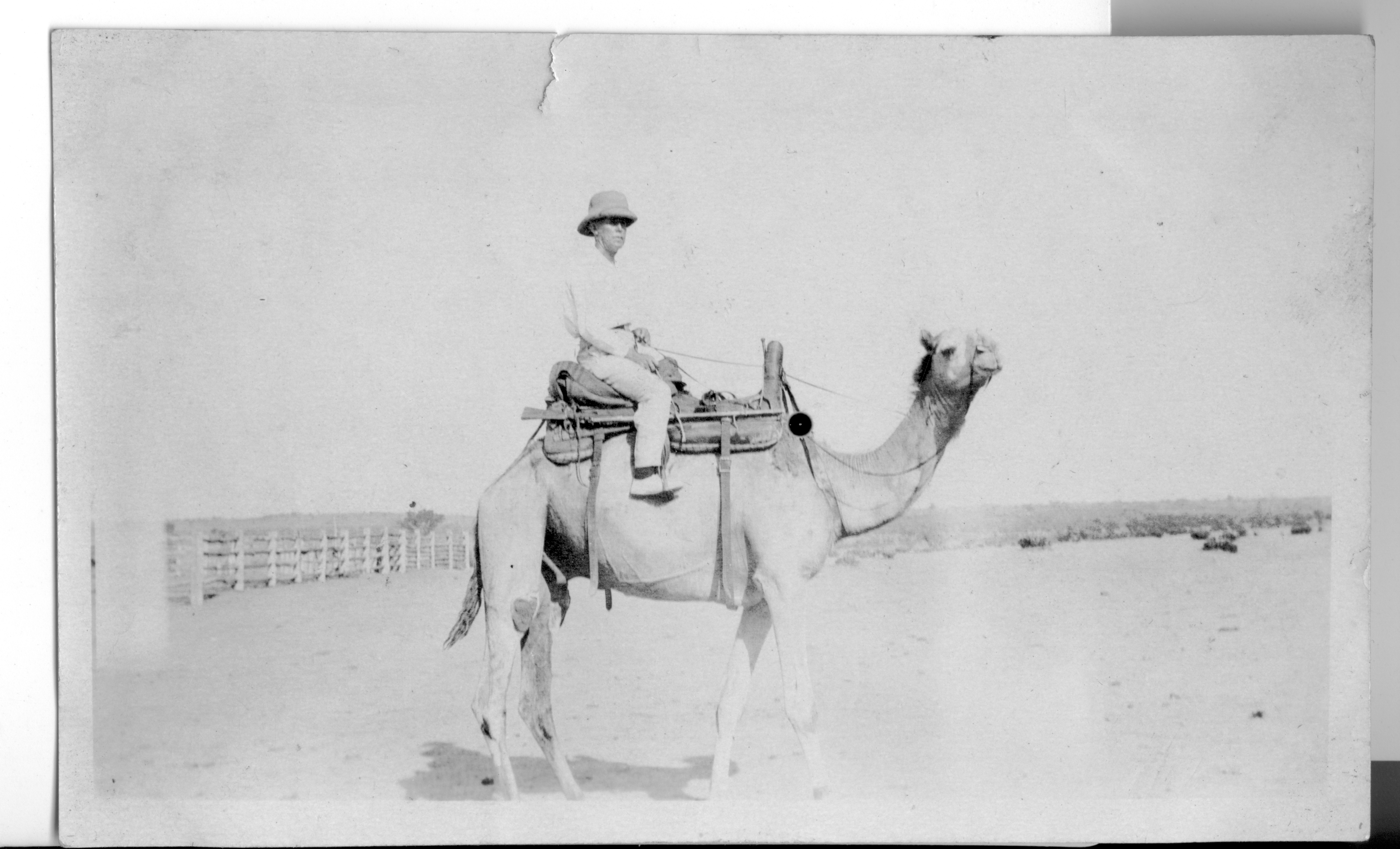
John Charles Cawood seated on a camel, December 1927.”

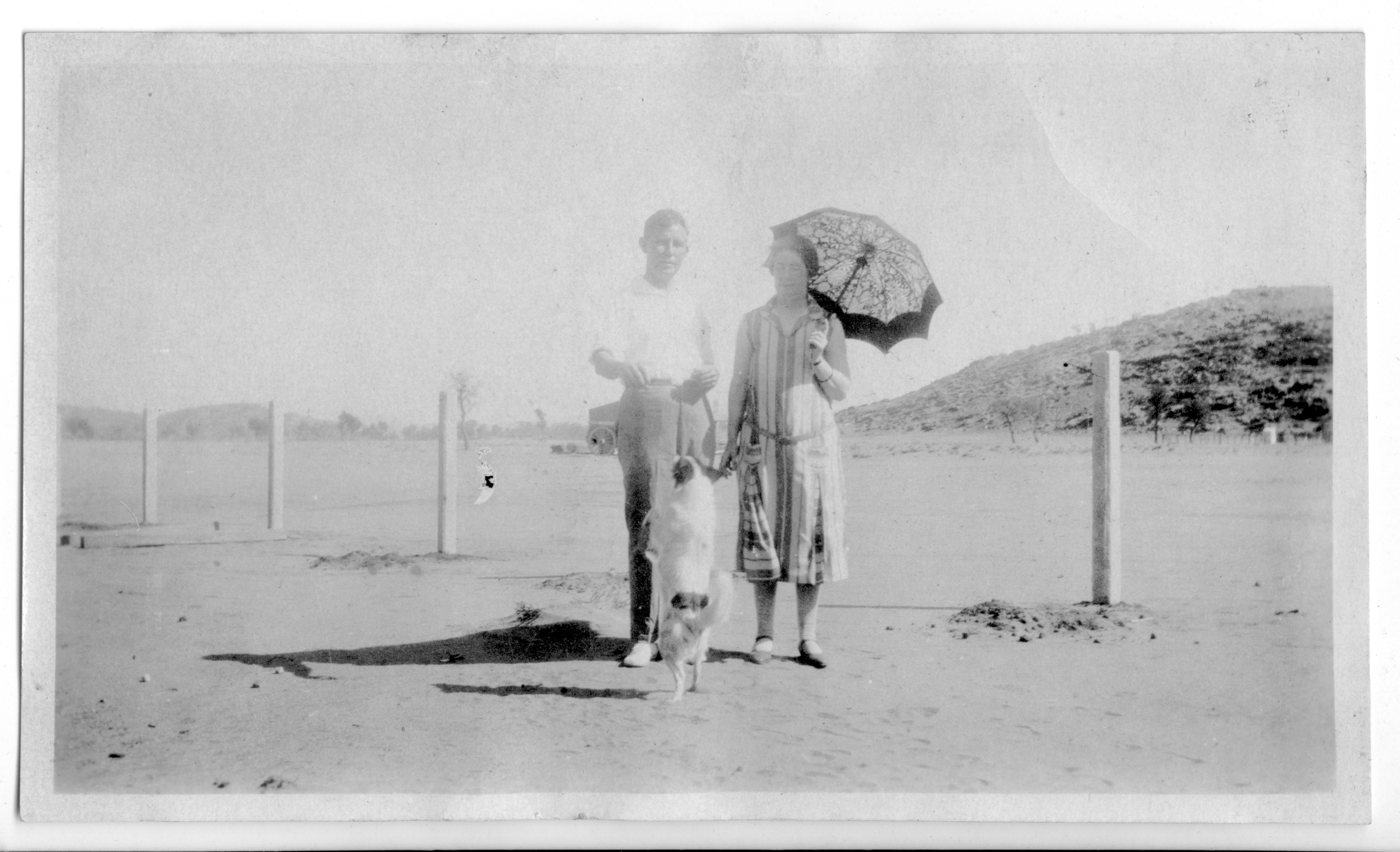
John Charles Cawood, his wife and Trixie, late 1920s

John Charles Cawood (1872–12 June 1962) was an Australian administrator who served as Government Resident of Central Australia during the territory's brief existence as a separate jurisdiction from the Northern Territory. The seat of power was Alice Springs, then known as Stuart Town.

Cawood had a background as a forester and sawmiller. He had served as president of the Bellingen Shire Council in New South Wales and was also a coroner and magistrate. Cawood was the first person to hold this office, serving from 1926 till 1929. He oversaw an inquiry in the Coniston Massacre of 1928. His successor was Victor George Carrington, who served from 1929 until the territory's abolition (and re-establishment of the Northern Territory) in 1931.

Cawood retired to Cronulla, New South Wales. He was elected president of the Cronulla branch of the United Australia Party in 1936, and in the same year chaired the inaugural meeting of the Australian Unification League, formed with the aim of abolishing state parliaments. He was the secretary of the Parramatta Co-operative Building Society in 1938.

He is the father of Stan Cawood.
