= Napperby Station =

Pastoral lease in the Northern Territory

Location in Northern Territory

Napperby Station, also known as Napperby, is a 5,500 square kilometres (2,124 sq mi) pastoral lease used as a cattle station in the Northern Territory of Australia.

== History ==
The station was established on Anmatyerre tribal land at the beginning of the 20th Century. The Chisholm family owned Napperby Station "on and off" from 1948 till 2017. The anthropologist T.G.H. Strehlow visited the station on his first fieldwork trip in 1932 to record songs and Anengkerr (dreaming) stories from the elder Friday Mpetyan.

Non-exclusive Native title was granted by the Federal Court of Australia to the Anmatyerr and Arrernte people over Napperby Station in 2013 by consent. Both claims were first filed in 2005 after mining leases were granted in the area. The Central Land Council submitted new applications for native title rights over the whole pastoral lease in 2011. The court sat at the small local community of Laramba.

== Current use ==
As of 2016 the station was managed by Roy and Janet Chisholm. They run Santa Gertrudis cattle on the property. Napperby was sold for A$20 million to Tim Edmunds, a local pastoralist, in 2017.

== Notable people ==
- Artist Clifford Possum Tjapaltjarri was born at Napperby in 1932.
- Artist Billy Stockman Tjapaltjarri was raised on the station.

== See also ==
- List of ranches and stations
