= Kaytetye people =

Aboriginal Australian people in the Northern Territory

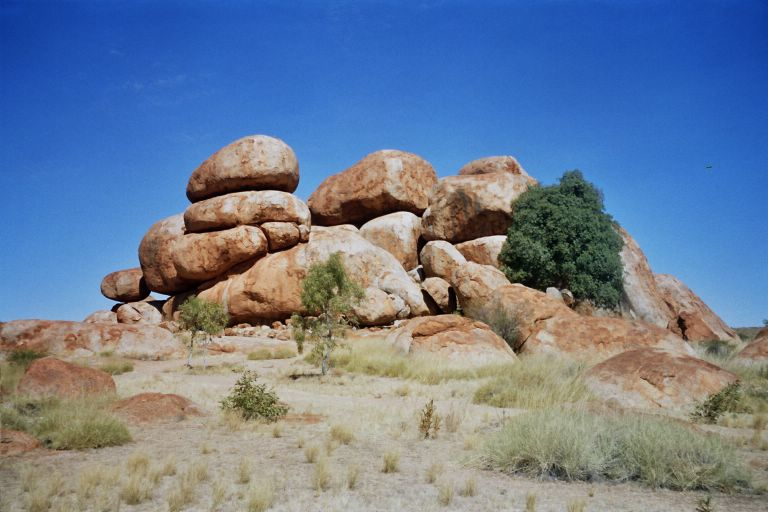
One of the boulder formations of Karlu Karlu (the Devils Marbles), a sacred Dreaming site for Kaytetye

The Kaytetye, also written Kaititya, and pronounced kay-ditch, are an Aboriginal Australian people who live around Barrow Creek and Tennant Creek in the Northern Territory. Their neighbours to the east are the Alyawarre, to the south the Anmatyerre, to the west the Warlpiri, and to the north the Warumungu. Kaytetye country is dissected by the Stuart Highway.

== Language ==
The Kaytetye language belongs to the Arandic subgroup of the Pama-Nyungan languages. It is considered to be a threatened language. A sophisticated form of sign language is also used by some Kaytetye.

== Country ==
In Norman Tindale's estimation the Kaytetye's traditional lands extended over roughly 12,500 square miles (32,000 km^{2}), to the southeast of Tennant Creek, taking in Elkedra, Gastrolobium Creek, Frew River, Whistleduck Creek, the headwaters of the Elkedra River, the Davenport and Murchison Ranges, together with Mount Singleton. Their northern frontier was roughly 5 miles (8.0 km) north of Kelly Well, while the southern boundary was close to Mount Octy. To the west they extended into the sandy desert area east of Hanson. They were present on Taylor and Barrow creeks, and at the Forster Range.

== Social organization ==
The Kaitetye, like the Anmatyerre, have an Aranda-type eight subsection system.

== History of contact ==
European penetration of Kaytetye country began with John Stuart's early explorations from 1860 onwards and his subsequent survey of the area for the purposes of installing an Overland Telegraph.

The two cultures did not initially integrate peacefully. In 1874, European settlers stationed at the Barrow Creek Telegraph Station are said to have infringed tribal laws regarding either sacred sites or women, and in reprisal Kaytetye men attacked the station, killing two whites. This sparked revenge killings by constables and settlers, who, acting in line with an inspector's suggestion that, "the close adherence to legal forms should not be insisted upon," carried out a savage series of retaliatory killings that decimated the Kaitetye, though affecting contiguous tribes as well. Official reports say only two Aboriginals were killed. Unofficial figures suggest the numbers went as high as 50-90, with some make an overall estimate of hundreds. The bones of Kaitetye people slaughtered in one such raid at the time, at Skull Creek, were visible for decades afterwards.

After the 1890s Kaytetye confrontations with whites became rarer. Later, in the widely known Coniston massacre of 1928, a series of three punitive raids occurred over a number of weeks as a police party of 8 men under Mounted Police Constable George Murray killed, according to a later inquiry, at least 31 Kaytetye, Warlpiri and Anmatyerre indiscriminately, though native oral records suggest a higher figure.

Kaytetye people worked alongside European settlers for years to come in pastoral and mining capacities but were not treated equally until the period of World War 2 in which an army settlement was established near Barrow Creek. Many Kaytetye men and women were employed and were treated fairly for the first time, making it difficult for pastoral stations to keep their Indigenous workers on the station. This forced a change the way Kaytetye pastoral workers were treated. Both the mining employment and the army settlement were temporary engagements, leaving the Kaytetye only pastoral work if they desired to stay in their country.

Kaytetye call the area around Barrow Creek Thangkenharenge which includes the site of their creation story at Elkerempelkere. Traditionally, the Kaytetye people maintain their connection to the sacred sites like Elkerempelkere. The Devils Marbles, which the Kaytetye call Karlu Karlu, are located on a sacred Dreaming site. It has been desecrated by whites on occasion. Granite was removed from the site for the tomb commemorating John Flynn, the 'Flying Doctor'. though subsequently restored under protest.

== Alternative names ==
- Gaididj
- Kadda-kie
- Kaitish
- Kaititj, Kaititja. (Aranda pronunciation)
- Kaititje, Kaititj, Kaitidji, Kaitije, Kaitiji, Katitja, Katitch-a, Kattitch-a, Kat-tit-ya

Source: Tindale 1974, p. 228.

== Sources ==
- Allen, Lindy (2015). "Message Sticks and Indigenous Diplomacy: "Thomson's Treaty"–Brokering peace on Australia's Northern Frontier in the 1930s". In Darian-Smith, Kate; Edmonds, Penelope (eds.). Conciliation on Colonial Frontiers: Conflict, Performance, and Commemoration in Australia and the Pacific Rim. Routledge. pp. 113–131. ISBN 978-1-317-80005-7.
- Berndt, Catherine H.; Berndt, Ronald M. (1987). End of an Era, Aboriginal Labour in the Northern Territory. Australian Institute of Aboriginal Studies.
- Elder, Catriona (2020). Being Australian: Narratives of national identity. Routledge. ISBN 978-1-000-25635-2.
- Henty-Gebert, Claire (2005). Paint Me Black: Memories of Croker Island and Other Journeys. Aboriginal Studies Press. ISBN 978-0-855-75399-3.
- Hill, Barry (2002). T. G. H. Strehlow and Aboriginal Possession. Knopf Publishers. ISBN 978-1-740-51065-3.
- Jones, Lucy Hughes (8 May 2017). "Angry Traditional Owners want the government to prosecute a tradie who defecated on an Indigenous sacred site in Central Australia". SBS News.
- Koch, Grace; Koch, Harold, eds. (1993). Kaytetye Country: An Aboriginal History of the Barrow Creek Area. Melbourne University Press. ISBN 978-0-949-65970-5.
- Koch, Harold (2011). "The Influence of Arandic languages on Central Australian Aboriginal English". In Lefebvre, Claire (ed.). Creoles, their Substrates, and Linguistic Typology. John Benjamins Publishing. pp. 437–460. ISBN 978-9-027-28743-4.
- Reid, Gordon (1990). A Picnic with the Natives: Aboriginal-European Relations in the Northern Territory to 1910. Melbourne University Press. ISBN 978-0-522-84419-1.
- Spencer, Sir Baldwin; Gillen, Francis J. (1904). Northern Tribes of Central Australia (PDF). Macmillan Publishers – via Internet Archive.
- Tindale, Norman Barnett (1974). "Kaititja (NT)". Aboriginal Tribes of Australia: Their Terrain, Environmental Controls, Distribution, Limits, and Proper Names. Australian National University Press. ISBN 978-0-708-10741-6. Archived from the original on 20 March 2020.
- Turpin/Thompson, Myf/Tommy (2003). Growing up Kaytetye (1st ed.). Alice Springs: Institute for Aboriginal Development. pp. 3–5.
