= Central Australia (disambiguation) =

Central Australia is a region in the Northern Territory of Australia

Central Australia may also refer to.

- Central Australia (territory), a former Australian internal territory
- Central Australia Railway, a former railway
- Supreme Court of Central Australia, a former superior court

== See also ==
- Central Australian Aviation Museum
- Central Australian Aboriginal Media Association
- Central Australian Football League
