= Narwietooma Station =

Pastoral lease in Northern Territory

Coordinates: 23.233°S 132.619°E

Location in Northern Territory

Narwietooma Station, most commonly known as Narwietooma, is a pastoral lease that operates as a cattle station in the Northern Territory of Australia. It is on the traditional lands of the Western Arrernte and Anmatyerr people who are the recognised Native Title holders of large sections of land that make up the station.

It is a part of the Local Government Area of the MacDonnell Region Council.

== Property ==
It is situated about 80 kilometres (50 mi) north of Hermannsburg and 139 kilometres (86 mi) west of Alice Springs, and is bordered by the West MacDonnell National Park close to Ormiston Gorge. Narwietooma is surrounded by other leases including Glen Helen Station to the south west, Derwent Station to the west, Napperby Station to the north and Amburla to the east, and the West MacDonnell National Park to the south.

The property occupies an area of 3,000 square kilometres (1,158 sq mi) and has a carrying capacity of approximately 17,000 head of cattle depending on the season. It is fenced into 80 separate paddocks and is watered by 60 bores and 35 dams.

== History ==
Part of the area that Narwietooma Station covers was first spasmodically occupied by Archibald "Archie" Giles as a part of Redbank Station.

The Narwietooma pastoral lease was first established in 1942 by a partnership between Edward Connellan, who was raised on Narwie Station, NSW, and F. O'Keefe, who owned a property named Tooma; the name of the lease was a portmanteau of the names of the other two properties.

Connellan was an experienced pilot, and later established Connellan Airways in 1943. He picked out the land for the station in 1938 when doing aerial surveys to assess the viability of an air service.

Following the death of his partners, Connellan acquired complete ownership of Narwietooma in 1946. He sank the first bore in 1947 and began grazing cattle in 1948. His family moved to the property in 1955 and Connellan supervised all station work. Records about Connellan's application for the lease (A650, 1944/1/551) and his period of time at the station (E740, P86) are held by the National Archives of Australia.

In 2022 to Hewitt Cattle Australia bought the property from Tim and Emily Edmunds, operating as Hale River Holdings, as a part of a Certified Organic beef enterprise alongside the adjoining Napperby, Glen Helen and Derwent stations; they had previously purchased the nearby Ambalindum and Numery pastoral leases from the same owners. It is now part of one of the largest organic land parcels in the world.

== Native Title ==
The Native Title of sections of this land was recognised in 2016 through native title consent determinations at special sittings of the Federal Court. The native title holders are Western Arrernte and Anmatyerr speakers and belong to the Imperlknge, Urlatherrke, Parerrule, Yaperlpe, Urlampe, Lwekerreye and Ilewerr landholding groups and people who have rights and interests in the area of land known as Kwerlerrethe.

The Wala Aboriginal Corporation are the registered Native Title body corporate that holds their rights and interests.

== See also ==
- List of ranches and stations
