= Ansett Australia Flight 232 =

1972 aircraft hijacking

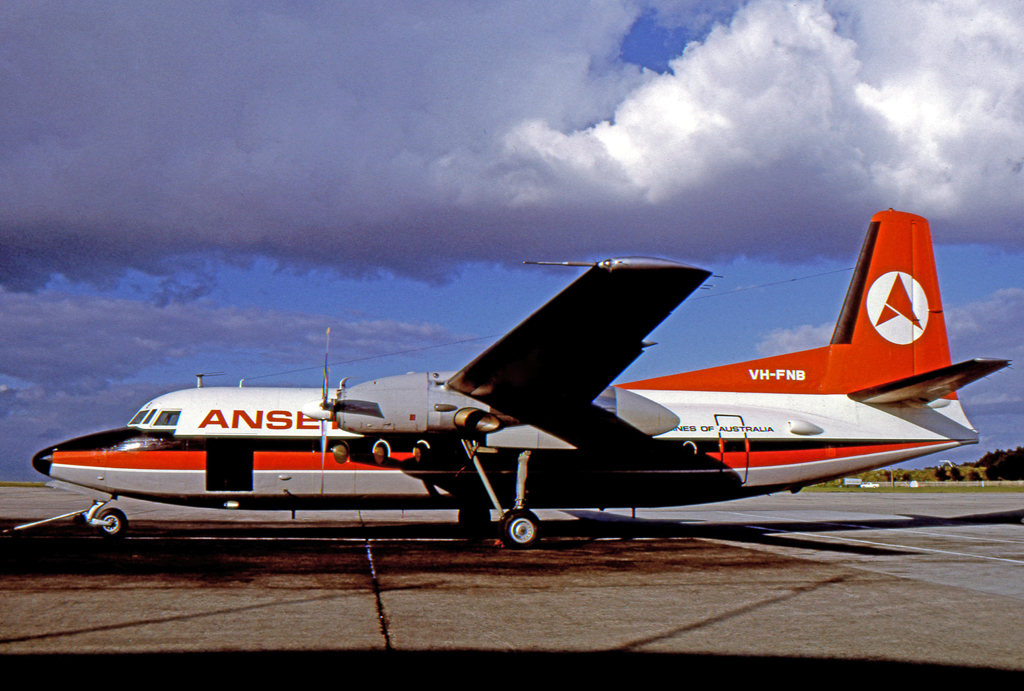
- Fokker F-27 Friendship of Ansett Airlines in 1970

Hijacking
- Date: 15 November 1972
- Summary: Hijacking
- Site: Alice Springs Airport, Alice Springs, Northern Territory, Australia; 23°48′08.43″S 133°54′02.92″E

Aircraft
- Aircraft type: Fokker Friendship
- Operator: Ansett Australia
- Registration: VH-FNI
- Flight origin: Adelaide Airport, Adelaide, South Australia, Australia
- Destination: Alice Springs Airport, Alice Springs, Northern Territory, Australia
- Occupants: 32
- Passengers: 28
- Crew: 4
- Fatalities: 1
- Injuries: 1
- Survivors: 31

Ansett Australia Flight 232, on Wednesday, 15 November 1972, was a flight from Adelaide, South Australia aboard a Fokker Friendship bound for Alice Springs, Northern Territory. It was Australia's second aircraft hijacking (after the first in 1960), and resulted in the perpetrator's death by suicide.

== In-flight hijack attempt ==
A male passenger, subsequently identified as Miloslav Hrabinec, a Czech migrant, had boarded the flight in Adelaide with a concealed sawn-off .22 ArmaLite rifle and a sheath knife strapped to his leg. About a half-hour before the scheduled landing time, as the flight was making its descent into Alice Springs Airport, he emerged from the lavatory, produced the gun, and said to a flight attendant named Gai Rennie, "This is a hijack".

Gai walked through the cabin followed by the hijacker. She then explained to flight attendant Kaye Goreham that the man behind her had a gun. All three then moved to the front of the aircraft. Gai then advised Captain Young and First Officer Walter Gowans that a man wanted to talk and he had a gun and said it was a hijack. However, Young said he was in landing mode and would talk to him on the ground. Young asked Rennie, "What does he want?" Rennie replied that she did not know. The crew informed Hrabinec that he needed to be seated for landing and he complied.

== Negotiations with police ==
After the plane landed, police commenced negotiations with the hijacker. According to Goreham's account, Hrabinec stated his motive was not financial (he asked for no money) but that he wanted to commit suicide in a spectacular way by parachuting into a remote location and surviving for as long as he could before killing himself. To this end, he demanded a light aircraft, a parachute, and a jumpsuit.

== Attempt to escape in a light aircraft ==
A civilian pilot and flying instructor, the local Aero Club manager Ossie Watts, volunteered himself and his Cessna aircraft. An undercover police constable Paul Sandeman, posing as Watts' navigator, was also on board the Cessna. According to Kaye Goreham, Hrabinec became suspicious upon seeing Sandeman and requested Goreham search Sandeman for weapons. Goreham did so but did not inform the hijacker when she felt a small firearm Sandeman had hidden. Goreham states that the policeman "went for his gun" and the hijacker shot Sandeman in the hand and stomach. Sandeman was also shot in the right shoulder and left arm. The hijacker ran off and Watts, who had been shown how to use a gun minutes earlier, began shooting. Police marksmen also opened fire and Hrabinec was wounded. Hrabinec then retreated to a ditch where he fatally shot himself.

== Outcome ==
Constable Sandeman was awarded the Queen's Commendation for Bravery.

Hrabinec was not identified as the hijacker until May 1973.

American humorist S. J. Perelman was aboard this aircraft, and witnessed the incident. It is described in his biography, and his letters.

== See also ==
- Connellan air disaster, suicide attack using a Beechcraft Baron at Alice Springs Airport in 1977
- Trans Australia Airlines Flight 408, attempted hijacking of a Lockheed Electra in 1960
- Qantas Flight 1737, attempted hijacking of a Boeing 717 in 2003
