= YBAS =

YBAS (or Ybas) can mean:

- Young British Artists, commonly abbreviated as YBAs
- Alice Springs Airport, an Australian airport with the ICAO code YBAS
