= Connair Flight 1263 =

1975 aviation accident

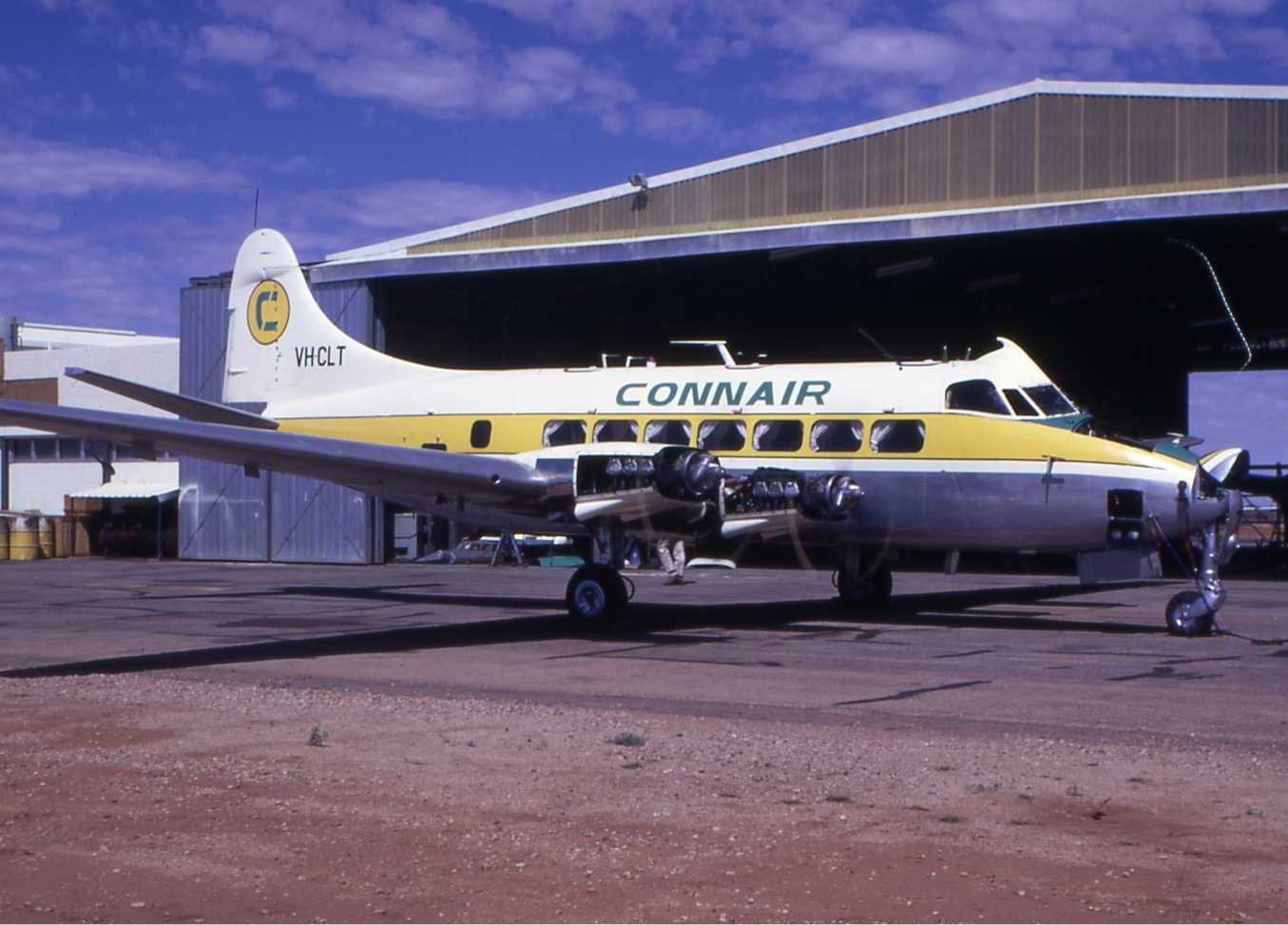
- A Connair Riley Heron, sister to the aircraft involved

Accident
- Date: 23 October 1975
- Summary: Controlled flight into terrain
- Site: 3km north of Cairns Airport, Queensland, Australia; 16°51′17.8″S 145°44′3.5″E

Aircraft
- Aircraft type: de Havilland DH.114 Riley Heron 2E/A1
- Operator: Connair
- Registration: VH-CLS
- Flight origin: Alice Springs Airport, Alice Springs
- Stopover: Mount Isa Airport, Queensland, Australia
- Destination: Cairns Airport, Queensland
- Occupants: 11
- Passengers: 8
- Crew: 3
- Fatalities: 11
- Survivors: 0

Connair Flight 1263 was a scheduled domestic passenger flight operated by Australian airline Connair from Mount Isa Airport to Cairns Airport on 23 October 1975 with a de Havilland Heron aircraft. During approach to Cairns Airport, the aircraft crashed at 19:28 (local time), killing the eight passengers and three crew on board. It was later determined that the pilots had not adhered to the standard operational procedures for a missed approach when the aeroplane could not be properly aligned with the runway.

The crash is one of the worst civil aviation disasters in Australia.

== Aircraft and crew ==
The aircraft was a de Havilland DH.114 Heron Series 2 modified to a Series 2E/A1, with the /A1 suffix denoting that it had been modified by Connair to a Riley Heron, by replacing the original de Havilland Gipsy Queen engines with Lycoming IO-540s; this modification had been developed by the American company Riley Turbostream Corporation. It was built in 1955 and was purchased second-hand by Connellan Airways (which later changed its name to Connair) and put into service in 1966 with the registration VH-CLS. It had flown a total of 14,986 hours at the time of the accident. The aircraft was not equipped with flight recorders, nor was it required to.

The captain was 30-year-old Geoffrey Alfred Edwards, who had logged 3,859 flight hours, including 1,030 hours on the DH.114 Heron. He had flown from Mount Isa to Cairns Airport 42 times. The first officer was 29-year-old Peter Scaif, who had logged only 184 flight hours, with 109 of them on the DH.114 Heron.

== Accident ==
On 23 October 1975, VH-CLS was flying Connair Flight 1263 from Alice Springs Airport in the Northern Territory to Cairns Airport via Mount Isa Airport, both in Queensland. The aircraft had departed Alice Springs just after 13:00 Australian Central Standard Time (13:30 Eastern Standard Time (EST)) and arrived at Mount Isa at 15:35 EST. It then took off for the second leg of the flight at 16:55, with two pilots, a flight attendant and eight passengers on board. At 19:17 EST it was cleared for Runway 15 at Cairns Airport. It was stormy weather, with heavy rain and lightning. The aircraft was misaligned with the runway and at 19:26 the pilot reported "going round". It turned away from the airport, descended to a low altitude and made a 270 degree turn to the left. The aircraft then made a right hand turn during which it descended and crashed 2.8 km North-West of Runway 15 in a sugar cane plantation. The aircraft was totally destroyed and all eleven people on board were killed.

== Investigation ==
The investigation into the crash was conducted by the Air Safety Investigation Branch of the Australian government's Department of Transport. The pilot in command and the air traffic controller were appropriately licensed, with the second pilot being appropriately qualified, but his licence was technically invalid at the time of the accident. There was not any defect in the aircraft that contributed to the crash. Prior to departure there was not a prediction of bad weather conditions at the arrival airport, but the pilot received in time sufficient information about the bad weather conditions. At low altitude the aircraft was in heavy to torrential rain but the weather conditions were better than the minima prescribed for landing at Runway 15 with an instrument landing system approach. The pilot in command did not act in conformance to the prescribed instrument landing system procedure, nor did he conform to the prescribed missed approach procedure. After the go-around, the pilot did not climb to a safe altitude for unknown reasons.

== See also ==
- List of disasters in Australia by death toll
