= Kookaburra (aircraft) =

Coordinates: 23°42′8″S 133°51′51″E

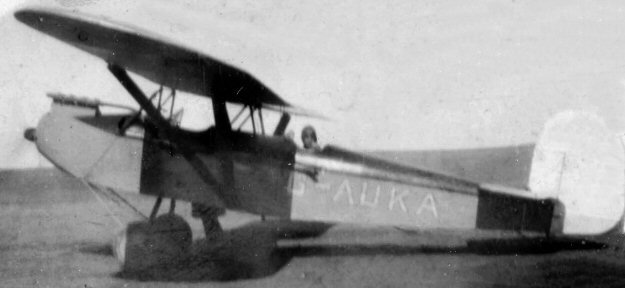

General information
- Type: Westland Widgeon
- Owners: Keith Anderson
- Construction number: WA1775
- Registration: G-AUKA

History
- Last flight: 10 April 1929
- Preserved at: The remains are on display at Alice Springs
- Fate: Abandoned in the Tanami Desert until remains were recovered and preserved

Kookaburra
Accident
- Date: 10 April 1929
- Site: Tanami Desert, Australia

Aircraft
- Aircraft type: Westland Widgeon
- Registration: G-AUKA
- Crew: 2
- Fatalities: 2
- Survivors: 0

Kookaburra was a Westland Widgeon light aircraft registered G-AUKA.

When Sir Charles Kingsford Smith and his crew in the Southern Cross disappeared in 1929 in what later came to be known as the "Coffee Royal" incident, pilot Keith Anderson and mechanic Henry Smith "Bobby" Hitchcock flew the Kookaburra in an attempt to find them. Kookaburra departed Richmond, New South Wales, on 10 April and headed for the north of Western Australia via Broken Hill, Maree, Oodnadatta and Alice Springs.

Kookaburra was forced to land in the Tanami Desert when the push rod on a valve on number two cylinder loosened, causing a loss of power. Hitchcock adjusted the push rod and the two men attempted to clear a runway. They were overcome by thirst and perished before they could clear a runway long enough. Their bodies were found on 21 April 1929 and two of the members of this party were William George Murray, Mijanu and Stan Cawood.

A ground party traveled from Wave Hill Station and buried the men where they lay. Due to a shortage of water for their horses, the ground party did not have time to clear a runway long enough for Kookaburra to take off. After a public outcry for leaving the men in the desert, a second expedition with a Thornycroft truck returned to the site and exhumed the bodies. Again, due to a shortage of water, a runway could not be cleared so the aircraft was not moved. In July 1929 Anderson was re-buried in Sydney and Hitchcock in Perth.

Kookaburra remained in the desert as it was not economical to recover it. It was unexpectedly discovered in 1961 by Vern O'Brien, a surveyor traveling through the area. It had been damaged by three decades of rain and bushfires. O'Brien did not ascertain an accurate location for the aircraft because the Tanami is flat and featureless. Several expeditions searched for Kookaburra after 1961 but to no avail.

Australian businessman, pilot and adventurer Dick Smith mounted an expedition in 1977 to find the Kookaburra but was unsuccessful. He searched again in 1978 and this time succeeded in finding the remains of the aircraft.

The remains of Kookaburra were moved to a public display at Alice Springs Airport and are currently at the Central Australian Aviation Museum.

== Gallery ==
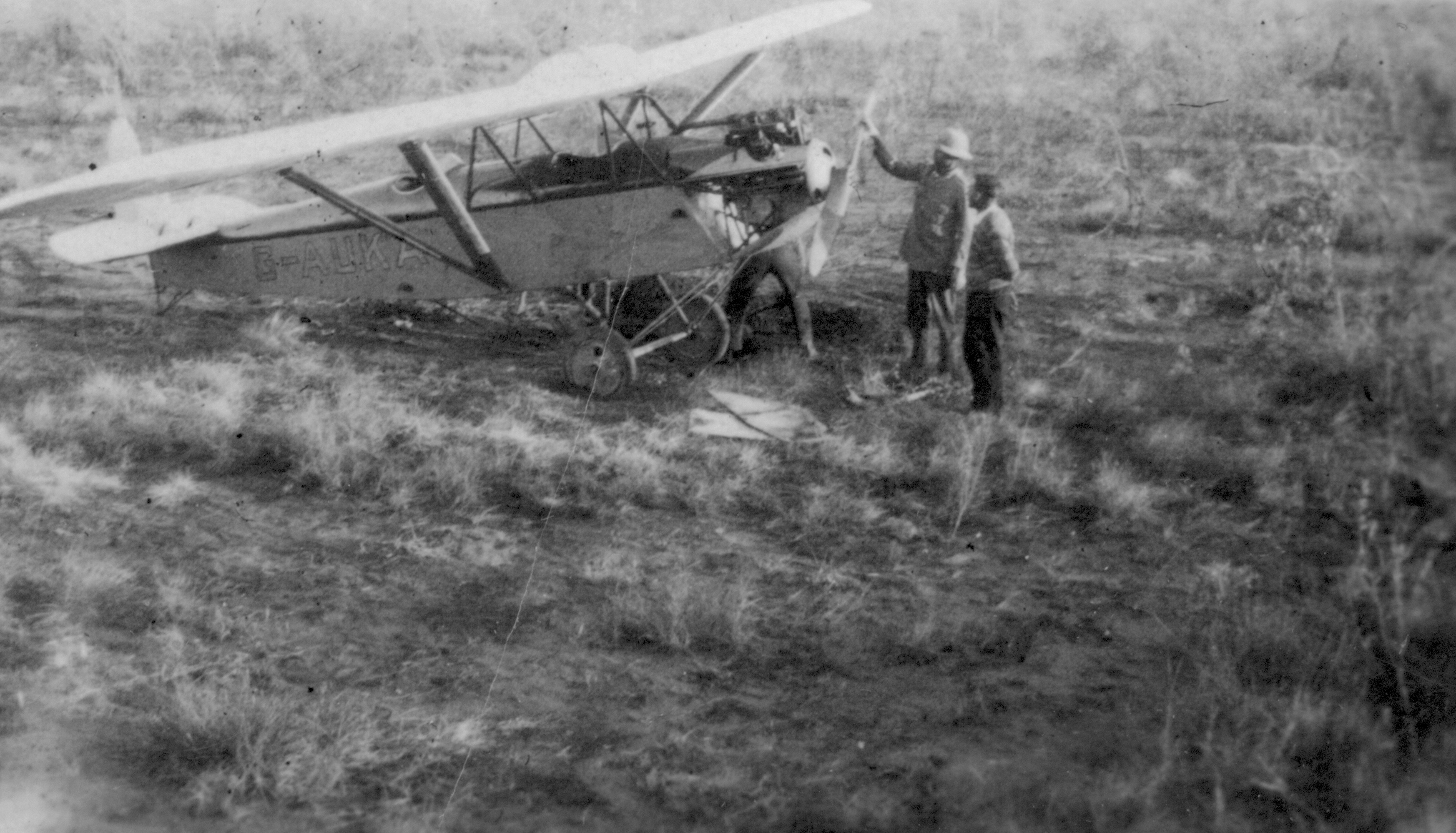
Two views of Kookaburra’s last landing ground, Central Australia, 1929.

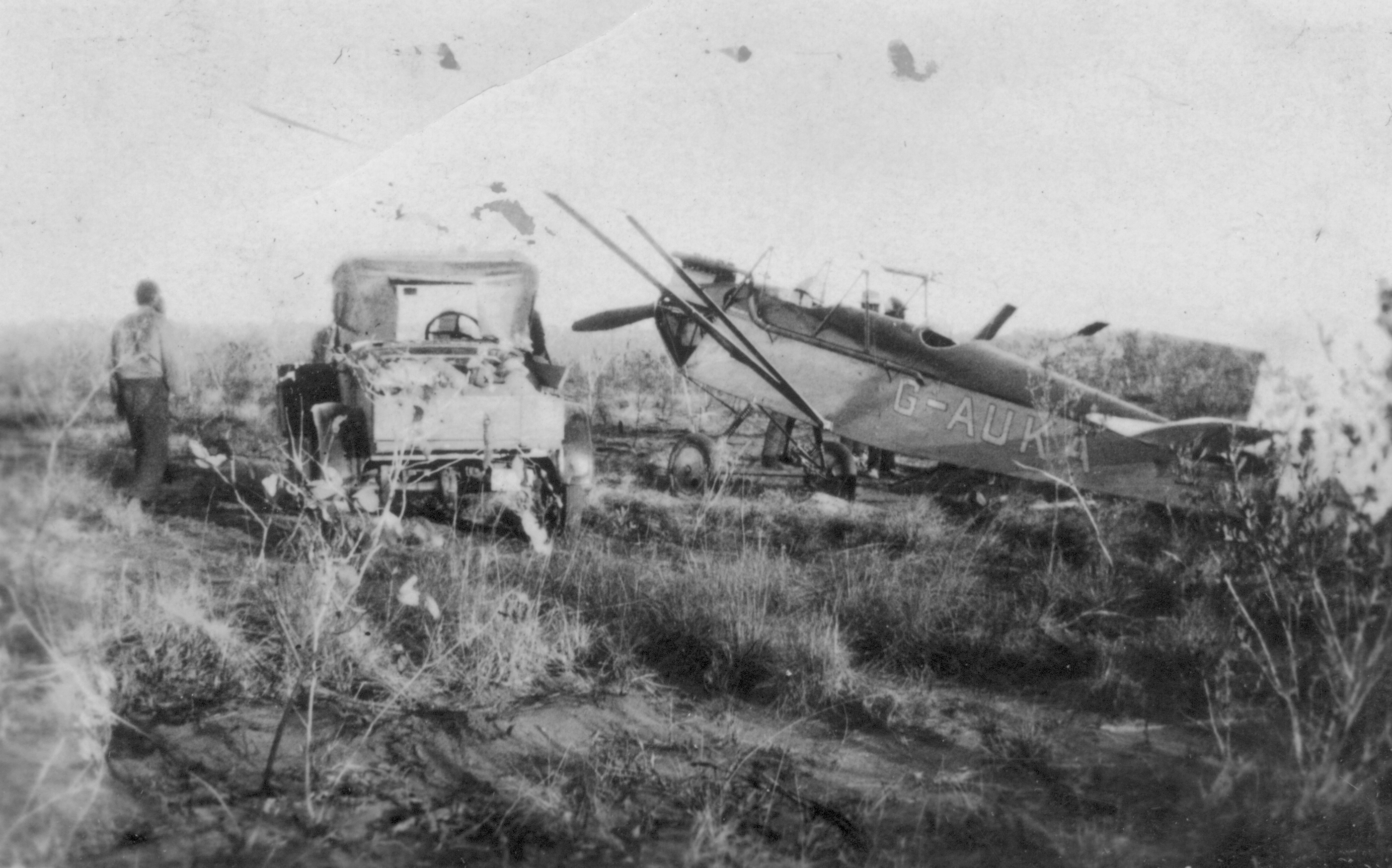
The remains of the plane, 1929

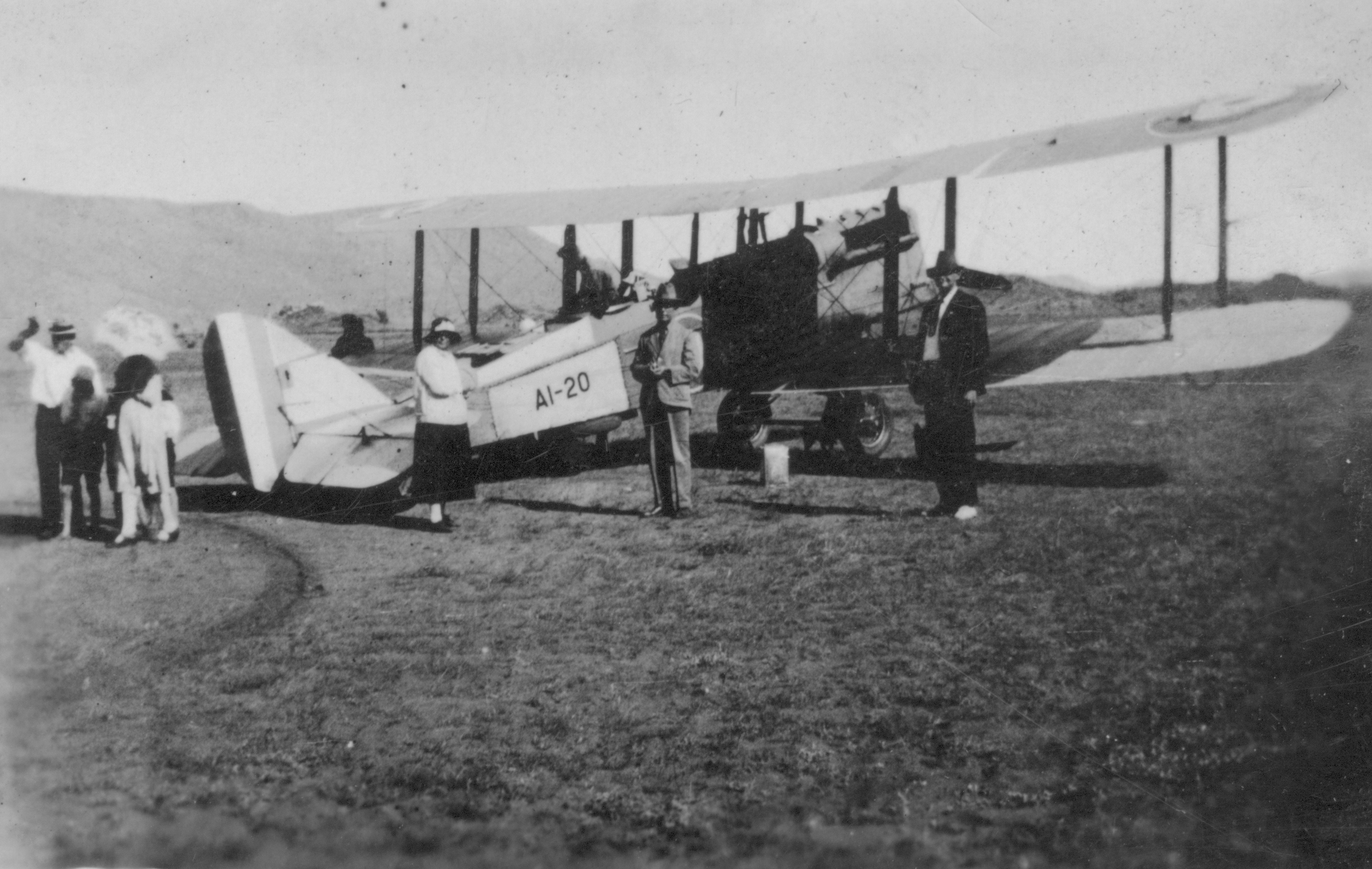
The RAAF Planes which searched for Keith Anderson, 1929

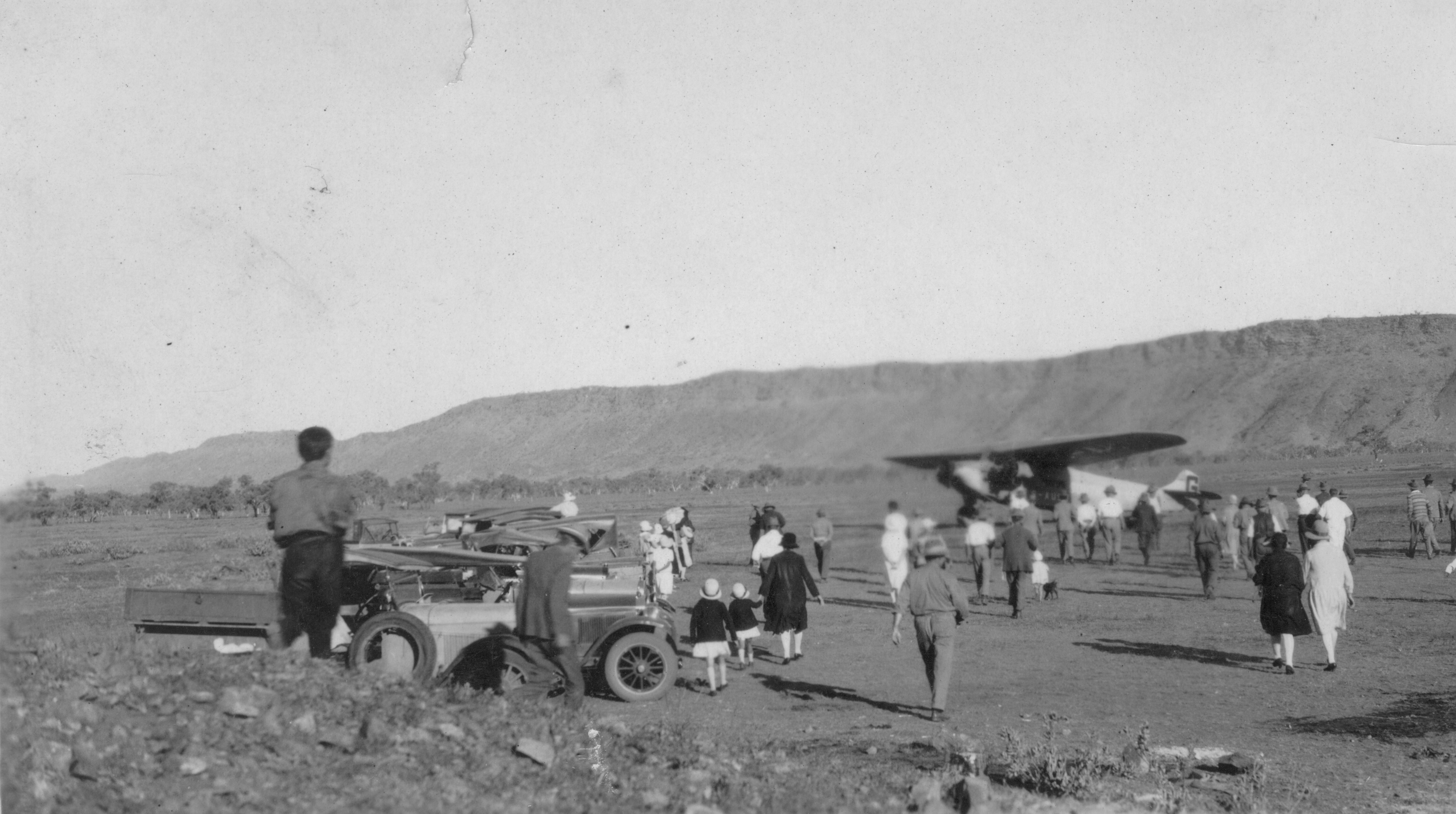
Royal Air Force planes in Alice Springs (Mparntwe) for the search, 1929

The Kookaburra Memorial at the Central Australian Aviation Museum in Alice Springs (Mparntwe), 1986
