= Connellan air disaster =

1977 suicide attack in Alice Springs, Northern Territory

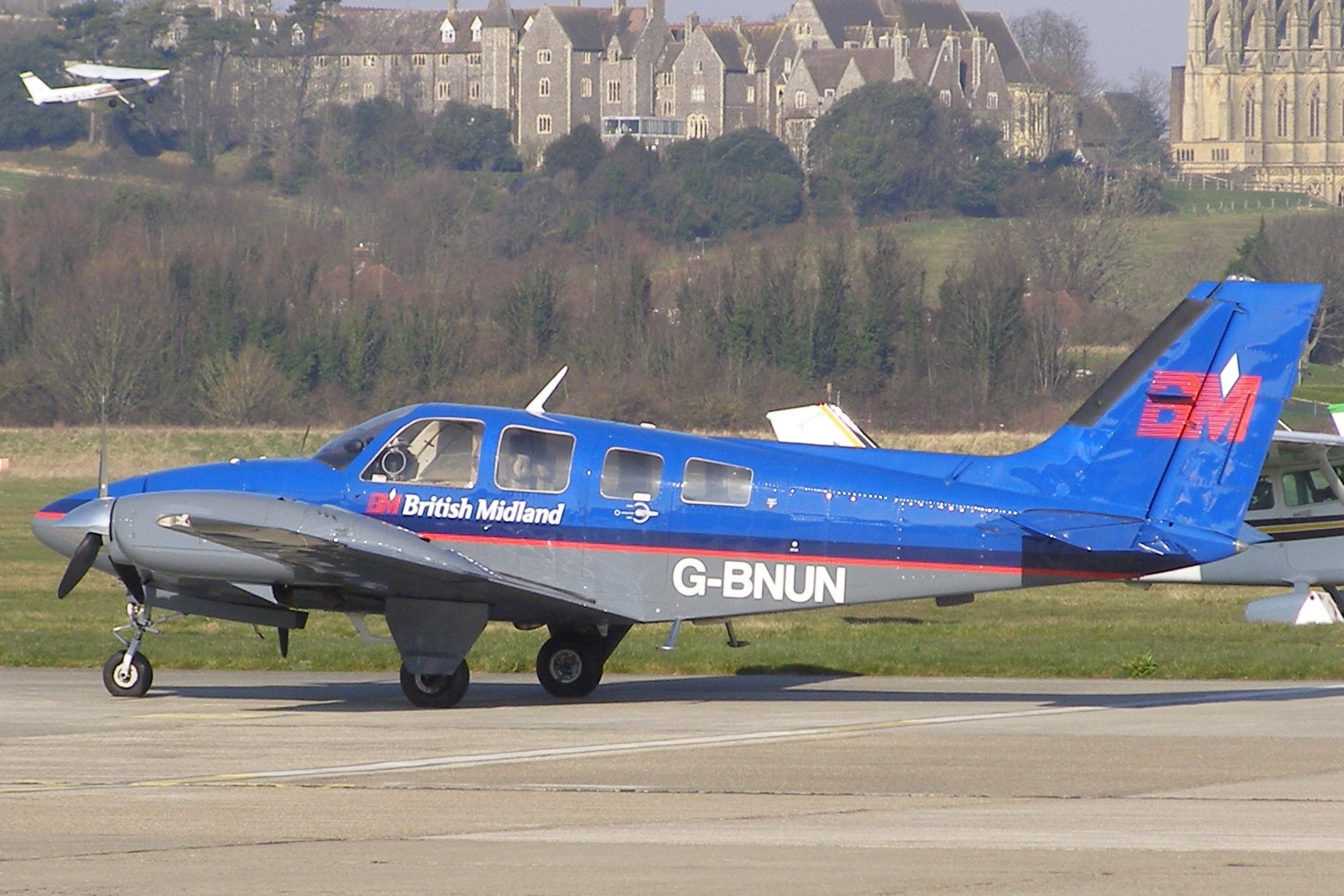
- A Beechcraft Baron 58 similar to that used in the attack
- Location: 23°48′13″S 133°54′12″E; Alice Springs Airport; Alice Springs, Northern Territory, Australia
- Date: 5 January 1977 approx. 10.30am local (UTC+9:30)
- Target: Connellan Airways building
- Attack type: Suicide attack, deliberate crash
- Weapon: Beechcraft Baron Fixed-wing aircraft
- Deaths: 5 (including perpetrator)
- Injuries: 4
- Perpetrator: Colin Richard Forman

The Connellan air disaster was a suicide attack at Alice Springs Airport, Northern Territory, Australia, on 5 January 1977.

The attack was carried out by a disgruntled former employee of Connellan Airways (also known as Connair), who flew a Beechcraft Baron into the Connair complex at the airport. The attack killed the pilot and four other people and injured four more, two of them seriously.

The disaster is one of only two aircraft suicide attacks in Australia's history, the other being in 1982 at Bankstown Airport.

== Background ==
The perpetrator, Colin Richard Forman, (Note: In some early sources, his last name is spelled "Foreman". See Colfeian Magazine (University of Sheffield), issue #40 (1971), p.9.) was 23 years old at the time of the attack. Forman was born in the United Kingdom and lived in New Eltham, London. He went to Colfe's Grammar School in Lee, London and went on to study at Suffield University. Following graduation he migrated by himself to Australia. In 1974, he had attempted to forge an airline ticket to England. The forgery was detected and Forman had a conviction recorded against him.

In November 1975, Forman qualified as a commercial pilot; he started flying for Connair in January 1976. His conviction for forgery became known to his employers, and, after seven weeks with Connair, Forman was dismissed. He found work as a pilot at Ord Air Charter in the northern Western Australian town of Wyndham, but was soon terminated there as well. Forman apparently believed that the proprietor of Connair, Roger Connellan, had informed Ord Air about Forman's conviction.

In late 1976, Forman was living in the Queensland city of Mount Isa, eking out a living flying occasional charter flights in a single-engine Cessna for freight and tourists, and becoming a member of the Mount Isa Aero Club. In about October 1976, he told a fellow member and local North West Star journalist, "If I don't get a job by Christmas then you will get to know, and through you most of the world will know". He attended the club's 1977 New Year's Eve party.

== Attack ==
Early on the morning of 3 January 1977, Forman trashed his one-bedroom flat in Mount Isa in a fit of rage, piled up the remnants in a corner of his lounge room and created what was later described as an altar. On the top was a trophy he won for having topped his course (Blue Flight) at the former Cessnock Nationwide Aviation Space Academy, and in front of the trophy was his pilot's log book, laid open.

On the date of Forman's termination from Connair, an entry read: "Sentenced to death this date", and the final page of his log book contained the date, aircraft type, call sign, destination and "Suicide Mission". The final words were "THE END" on the left and right pages respectively.

Forman drove about 2,000 kilometres (1,200 mi) to Wyndham, stopping overnight in the Northern Territory town of Katherine. On 5 January he stole a Beechcraft 58 Baron (Aircraft registration VH-ENA) from Wyndham Airport after discovering the larger aircraft he had wanted to use was being used by the Royal Flying Doctor Service that day. Alice Springs is four hours flying time from Wyndham in a Beechcraft Baron: Forman had planned to strike at 10 am during Connair's morning break, but he did not account for the one-and-a-half-hour time difference between Western Australia and the Northern Territory, and arrived at 11 am.

As he reached Alice Springs Airport, Forman broadcast a final message by radio: "It is better to die with honour than live without it – Echo – November – Alpha." Forman then set full power on both engines and aimed at the Connellan complex before plunging the aircraft into the centre of the building. Forman and three other people were killed on impact, including his former manager Roger Connellan, son of airline founder Edward Connellan. A secretary was badly burned and died of her injuries in hospital five days later. Four other Connair employees were injured.

== Aftermath ==
During the investigation, letters addressed to the Department of Transport were found which explained Forman's motivations. In them he related his court appearance, described his seven weeks working at Connair as the happiest in his life, and his employment issues following dismissal. He also detailed his plan and his aim to "cause Connair the maximum amount of loss and hardship" and "to kill and maim as many employees of Connair Pty Ltd as possible". This latter comment was erroneously attributed to the final entry in his log book by some media outlets.

Connellan Airways was sold to East-West Airlines in 1980.

== See also ==
- Ansett Australia Flight 232 (also at Alice Springs Airport)
- EgyptAir Flight 990
- Silkair Flight 185
- LAM Flight 470
- Germanwings Flight 9525
- 2010 Austin suicide attack
- Japan Airlines Flight 350
- Royal Air Maroc Flight 630
- 2018 Horizon Air Q400 incident
