= Edward Connellan =

Australian aviator (1912–1983)

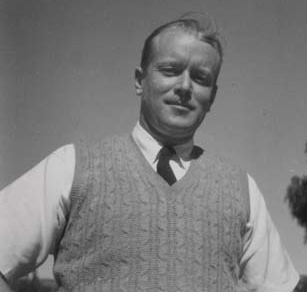
- EJ Connellan in 1950.
- Born: Edward John Connellan; 24 June 1912; Donald, Victoria, Australia
- Died: 26 December 1983 (aged 71); Australia

Edward John ("EJ" or "Eddie") Connellan AO, CBE (24 June 1912 – 26 December 1983) was an Australian aviator who founded Connellan Airways and was a pioneer of aviation in the Northern Territory.

== Early life ==
Connellan was born on 24 June 1912 at Donald in western Victoria, the eldest of seven children to his parents Thomas and Lucy Connellan. At Donald the family owned farming and grazing property. Connellan's station life continued when the family moved to the Riverina district of New South Wales.

From 1927 to 1929 he boarded at Xavier College in Melbourne to complete his secondary education. After school he became a teacher with the Victorian Education Department, but resigned in July 1933 to go into business. Flying became a passion and he gained his private pilot's licence on 8 July 1936.

== The Northern Territory ==
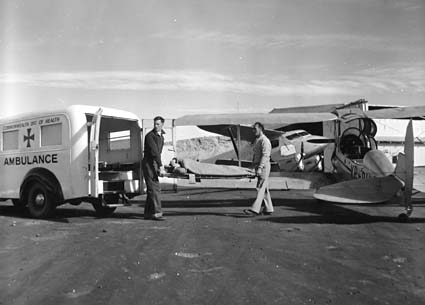
A Royal Flying Doctor Service patient is transferred from a Connellan Airways Fox Moth to an ambulance.

Perceiving business opportunities in the Northern Territory, in October 1937 Connellan prepared a report, "Notes on proposals for Aerial Freight Transport in Australia", with the aim of assisting the development of remote regions of northern Australia. In 1938 he undertook two aerial surveys of the Northern Territory to investigate pastoral land for the government, and to select land for a cattle station for himself, his brother and two friends. An area he identified as suitable for his pastoral property was eventually established as Narwietooma Station in 1943.

During the survey he met the Federal Minister responsible for the Northern Territory, John McEwen, and discussed the role of air services in the region. Connellan agreed to a three-year trial of an air mail service between Alice Springs and Wyndham in Western Australia, which attracted a subsidy from the federal government. The mail run commenced on 11 July 1939 and was worked on a fortnightly return basis. Connellan also negotiated a contract to provide an Alice Springs-based Royal Flying Doctor Service.

== Connellan Airways ==
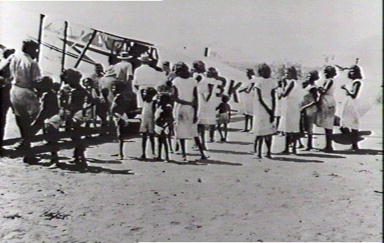
A Connellan Airways plane visiting the Roper River Mission.

In the midst of World War II Connellan consolidated his air services, which had grown viable and included more routes, and registered Connellan Airways on 23 July 1943. In June 1944 Connellan became a founding member of the Northern Territory Development League. In the post war years Connellan Airways grew, acquiring new routes and equipment. In February 1951 it became a limited company, with many of the shares held by station people and staff. In 1963 Connellan Airways became a regular public transport (RPT) operator. In 1970 the name was changed to Connair. Connair faced financial difficulty in the 1970s and was sold to East-West Airlines on 14 March 1980. It went into liquidation shortly after.

Along with three other employees, Connellan's eldest son Roger was killed on 5 January 1977 when a disgruntled ex-employee flew a stolen plane into the Connair building at Alice Springs Airport in what became known as the Connellan air disaster.

== Connellan Airways Trust ==
The Connellan Airways Trust was started by Connellan towards the end of his life. When Connellan Airways was sold in 1980, there were 50 shareholders, with the Connellan family holding slightly more than 50%. Most shareholders agreed to contribute 47% of their receipts from the sale to the Trust. It was established by a deed of trust dated 12 June 1981 and officially launched by Deputy Prime Minister Doug Anthony on 11 February 1983 at the Central Australian Aviation Museum. The Trust aims to encourage knowledge and education in outback Australia. In 2004–05 A$140,308 was granted to 140 applicants.

== Awards and death ==
In 1953, for services to aviation, Connellan was awarded the Queen's Coronation Medal. In 1957 he was made an Officer of the Order of the British Empire in the New Years Honours List, "for services to civil aviation in Northern and Central Australia". In 1965 he was awarded the Oswald Watt Gold Medal for his "outstanding contribution to general aviation" by the Royal Federation of Aero Clubs of Australia (RFACA). In 1978 he was created a Commander of the Order of the British Empire, and in 1981 appointed an Officer of the Order of Australia "for services to aviation and the community".

Connellan died on 26 December 1983, at the end of the year the Trust was opened. He is buried in the memorial cemetery at Alice Springs, adjacent to the cemetery is a museum dedicated to Connellan and Connellan Airways.
