= QantasLink Flight 1737 =

2003 attempted airliner hijacking

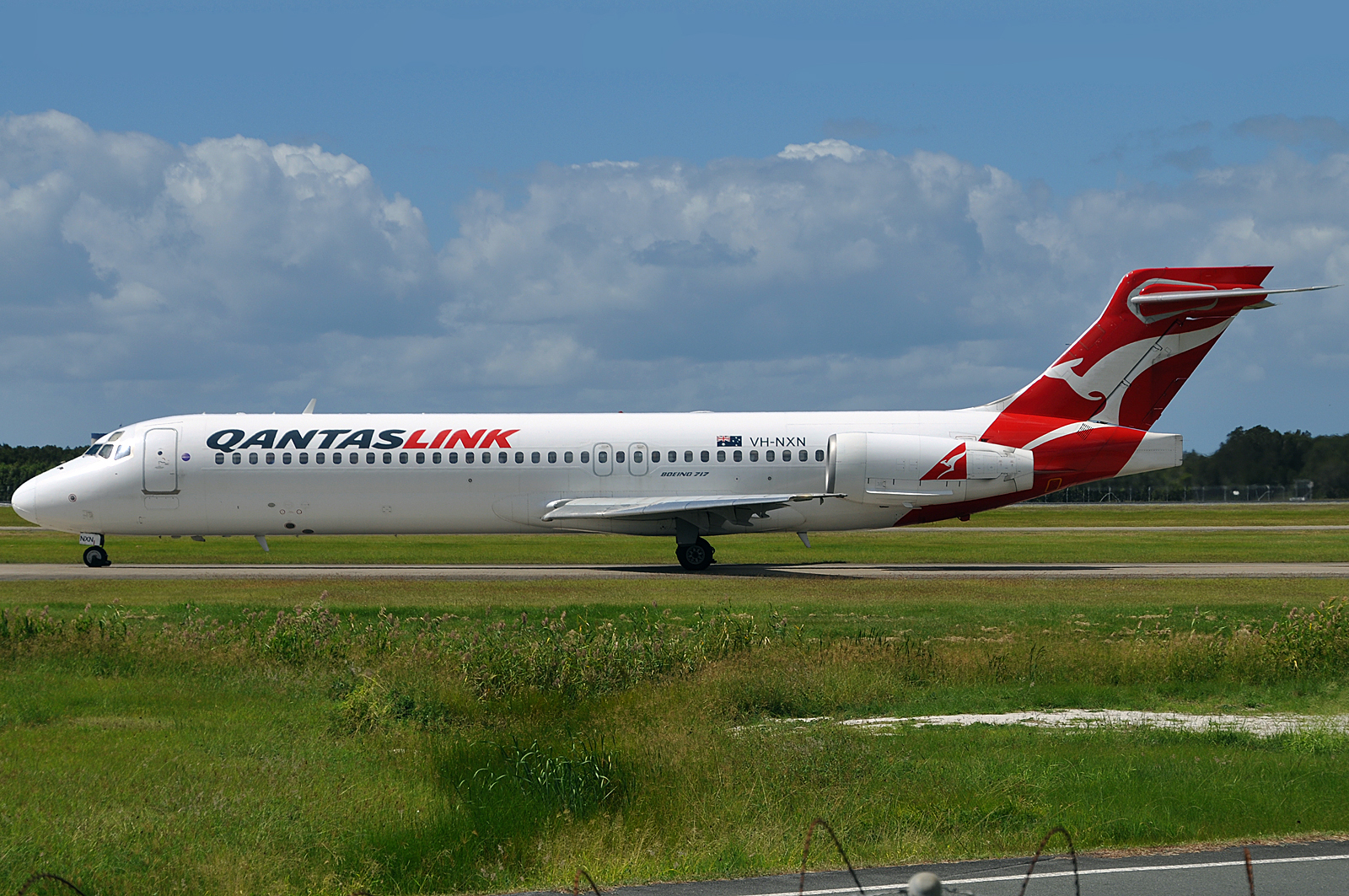
- VH-VQI, the Boeing 717 involved after being re-registered as VH-NXN.

Hijacking
- Date: 29 May 2003
- Summary: Attempted Hijacking
- Site: Over Merriks Beach, Australia; 38°24′04.34″S 145°06′43.97″E

Aircraft
- Aircraft type: Boeing 717-200
- Operator: Impulse Airlines, QantasLink
- Registration: VH-VQI
- Flight origin: Melbourne Airport
- Destination: Launceston Airport
- Occupants: 53
- Passengers: 47
- Crew: 6
- Fatalities: 0
- Injuries: 4
- Survivors: 53

QantasLink Flight 1737 was an afternoon Australian domestic flight from Melbourne Airport to Launceston Airport, which was subject to an attempted hijacking on 29 May 2003. It was the first attempted hijacking since the September 11 attacks.

== Hijack attempt ==
Flight 1737 left Melbourne Airport at 2.50 pm on 29 May. Around ten minutes after take-off, as the crew prepared for the onboard meal service, David Mark Robinson, a passenger seated in Row 7, became agitated, stood up and began to make his way down the aisle. Producing two sharpened wooden stakes from his pocket, Robinson stabbed flight attendant Denise Hickson and flight purser Greg Khan in the head on his way to the cabin galley. Khan tackled Robinson to unbalance him, eventually succeeding despite repeated blows to the back of the head from Robinson's stakes, which caused him severe injuries. Several passengers (including a Canadian paramedic, Derek Finlay, a former Canadian soldier in Princess Patricia's Canadian Light Infantry) helped restrain Robinson, holding him down and tying him up with materials found on board.

The plane immediately turned back to Melbourne, where Robinson was placed under arrest by Australian Federal Police. He was also found to be carrying aerosol cans and cigarette lighters, which he told police he intended to use as a flamethrower.

Khan and Hickson were later taken to Royal Melbourne Hospital for treatment, and two passengers who received minor injuries were treated at the airport by paramedics.

== Safety and security concerns ==
Despite numerous security improvements following the September 11, 2001 attacks, Flight 1737 lacked certain security arrangements. The door to the flightdeck had not been adapted to completely block access from the outside, and there was no sky marshal on board.

Qantas undertook a full security review following the incident and promised to secure the flightdeck doors on all of their aircraft by 1 November. The airline dismissed the suggestion of armed sky marshals on each flight as too expensive, and a full body search of passengers to detect wooden objects as unfeasible.

== Aftermath ==
In an interview with the Australian Federal Police, Robinson admitted attempting to hijack the plane, which he intended to crash into the Walls of Jerusalem National Park in Tasmania – an action intended to release the Devil from his lair and bring about Armageddon. Robinson also admitted that he had intended to hijack aircraft on two previous occasions.

In July 2004, a Supreme Court of Victoria jury found Robinson not guilty of the three charges against him (attempted hijack of an aircraft, attempted murder and grievous bodily harm) due to reasons of mental impairment. Three psychiatrists testified that at the time of the incident, Robinson was suffering from severe paranoid schizophrenia. Justice Murray Kellam ordered Robinson to undergo psychiatric treatment at Thomas Embling Psychiatric Hospital in Fairfield.

Flight attendants Greg Khan and Denise Hickson returned to work after the incident. Khan and four of the passengers who helped restrain his attacker (Domenic Bordin, Keith Charlton, Gregory Martin and Garry Stewart) were awarded the Commendation for Brave Conduct from the Governor of Victoria, John Landy, in November 2004.

Qantas also made a training video regarding the incident; the crew involved were interviewed and this is shown during security training. Khan also speaks of how a passenger complained that the aircraft was returning to Melbourne, even though two crew members had suffered serious injuries and an attempt to hijack the aircraft had just occurred. Khan and other crew also report the amount of blood stains throughout the aircraft as a result of the injuries.

Upon further investigations by the airline, it was found one of the cabin crew used the international code for hijacking over the interphone to the flight deck. The crew member states she got a reply, however the flight deck crew never heard the message, and found out much later that an attempted hijacking had occurred and crew were injured. The flight deck crew also stated they both heard yelling and screaming coming from the passenger cabin, and that they attempted to call the cabin crew but they received no answer and decided at this point to declare a pan-pan call to air traffic control (a pan-pan call is one call below the urgency of a Mayday).

== See also ==
- Trans Australia Airlines Flight 408
- Ansett Airlines Flight 232
