= Mijanu =

Australian police tracker (c. 1900–1978)

Mijanu also known as Long Tommy or Tracker Tommy, (c. 1900 – June 1978) was a stockman and police tracker from the Newcastle Waters region of the Northern Territory of Australia.

== Life in the Northern Territory ==
Mijanu grew up in the area of Newcastle Waters and Powell Creek and his traditional country was west of Banka Banka Station and his patrilineal (from his father) Dreaming was Japurla-japurla and Karu while his matrilineal (from his mother) Dreaming was ngurlu and yalawan. His first languages were Mudburra and Jingulu but he could also speak Warumungu, Warlmanpa and English.

As a young man Mijanu worked as a stockman at Elkedra Station, where he worked for pastoralist Fred Kennedy and Bill Riley where he became a skilled horseman and then, later, at Newcastle Waters Station. Soon after starting at Newcastle Waters Station he began to take regular work as a police tracker. In April 1929 we was recruited by William George Murray to assist the group searching for the Kookaburra (aircraft).

After this he began working regularly with Philip Muldoon, who was then the police constable at Newcastle Waters Police Station, throughout the 1930s and, in 1940s, with other police officers posted there. Mijanu's wife, Ruby, would also take work at the Police Station and later helped Gordon Stott when the police station was moved to Elliott which was newly established. At the new station Mijanu and Ruby chose not to stay at the accommodation provided for them but in the Aboriginal camp and was responsible for maintaining the police horses and yards when they were not tracking.

While at Elliott Mijanu and Ruby had a son named Jamie who was born on 10 June 1950 and predeceased his father on 20 August 1990. They had another child, a daughter, Dolly Nangala (Julypungali).

By the 1960s Mijanu retired from police work and was a pensioner and, from 1966 worked at Elliott with linguist Neil Chadwick in his study of the Jingulu language and other languages in the region; in this he was credited as Tommy Midyano; he was also interviewed by Ken Hale. Also, between 1967-1971, he was employed as a guide to prospectors in the region, including along the Murranji Track.

Mijanu died in June 1978 and was buried at the Elliott Cemetery on 15 June 1978.

== Description ==
Mijanu has been described as an "upstanding giant of a man" and he was 193 centimetres (6.33 ft) tall with a strong physique.
