= Trans Australia Airlines Flight 408 =

Attempted hijacking in 1960

TAA Flight 408
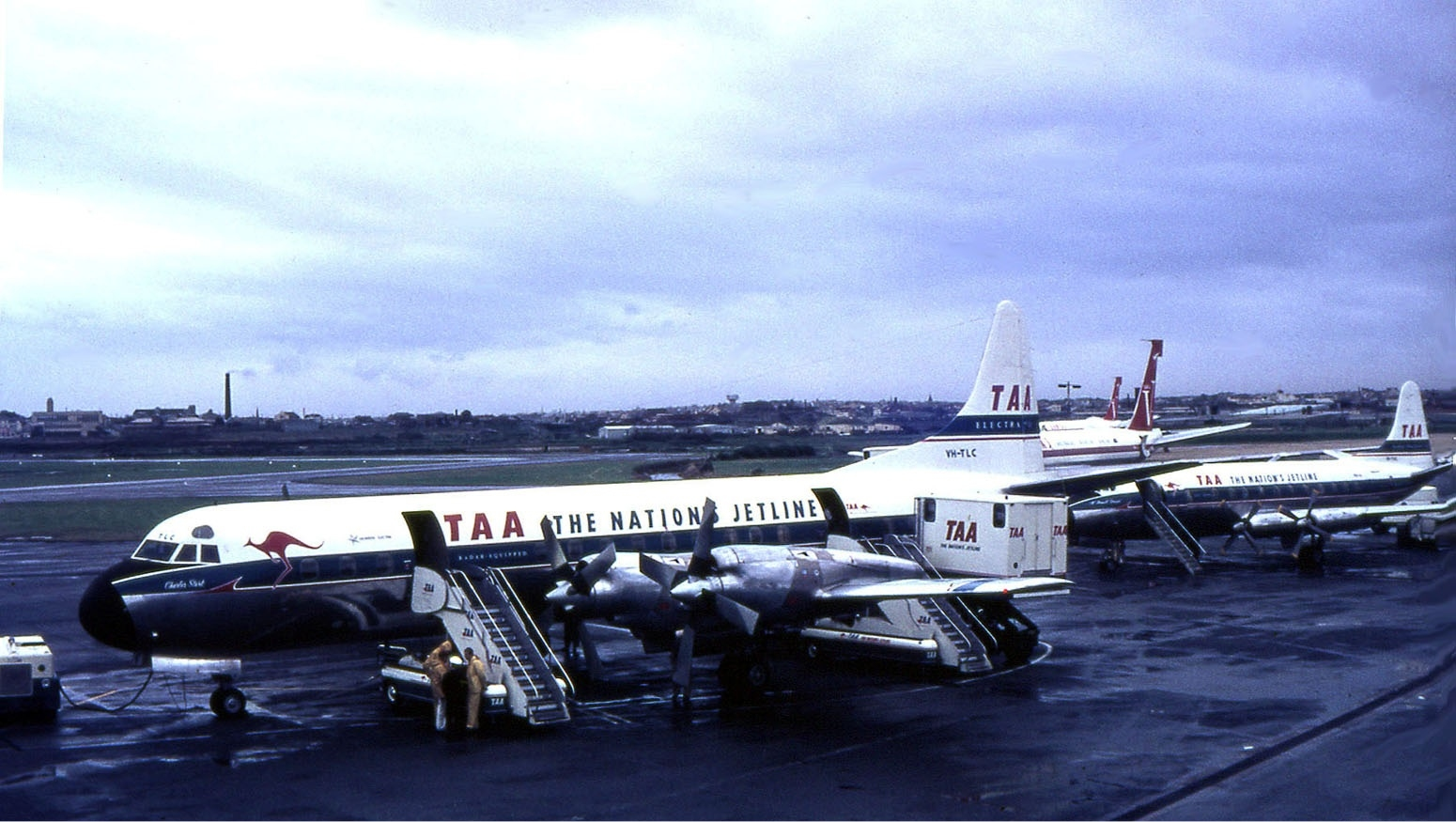
- A Trans Australia Airlines Electra, similar to the aircraft involved

Hijacking
- Date: 19 July 1960
- Summary: Attempted hijacking
- Site: Brisbane, Australia; 27°28′08.14″S 153°01′24.55″E

Aircraft
- Aircraft type: Lockheed Electra
- Operator: Trans Australia Airlines
- Registration: VH-TLB
- Flight origin: Sydney Airport, Sydney, New South Wales, Australia
- Destination: Eagle Farm Airport, Brisbane, Queensland, Australia
- Occupants: 49
- Passengers: 43
- Crew: 6
- Fatalities: 0
- Injuries: 0
- Survivors: 49

The Trans-Australian Airlines hijacking was Australia's first aircraft hijacking. It occurred on 19 July 1960 over Brisbane, Queensland, in a Trans Australia Airlines (TAA) Lockheed Electra.

43 passengers and six crew were on board Flight 408, the last Sydney to Brisbane flight for the day. The crew consisted of hostesses Fay Strugnell and Janeene Christie, captain John Benton, first officer T. R. (Tom) Bennett and flight engineer Fred McDonald. Another TAA pilot, captain D. R. (Dennis) Lawrence, was traveling in the cockpit as a passenger.

The hijacker, Alex Hildebrandt, wielded a sawn-off .22 calibre rifle, as well as a bomb: two sticks of gelignite, connected to a detonator that would apparently have fired, had Hildebrandt touched a bare wire to a torch battery. After demanding that the plane be redirected to Singapore, Hildebrandt fired a shot, which went through the aircraft ceiling. Captain Bennett, who had been narrowly missed by the bullet, punched Hildebrandt and pulled the wires from his hand, disabling the bomb. Captain Lawrence assisted Bennett in subduing and disarming the hijacker. Bennett was awarded the George Medal for his actions and Lawrence was formally commended.

Hildebrandt, who had been born in the Soviet Union in 1938, faced serious charges of attempted murder, having an explosive detonating device with the intention of destroying the aircraft and having explosives capable of causing injuries to persons on board. Hildebrandt was sentenced to three years in jail for attempted murder, 10 years for attempting to destroy the aircraft and two years for the explosives charge. He successfully appealed the sentence in the Queensland Criminal Court as he argued that the aircraft which was 35 minutes into the flight, was over New South Wales (NSW) when he armed the explosives in the aircraft toilet. He served a three-year sentence in Brisbane, for attempted murder and on discharge was arrested by detectives from NSW. He faced court again and was convicted on the charge of attempted destruction of an aircraft and sentenced to seven years imprisonment in New South Wales.

== See also ==
- Ansett Airlines Flight 232
- Qantas Flight 1737
