= Connellan Airways =

Airline of Australia

Connellan Airways Connair
| IATA | ICAO | Call sign |
|---|---|---|
| CK | — | — |
- Founded: 1939
- Ceased operations: 1980 (acquired by East-West-Airlines)
- Operating bases: Alice Springs Airport
- Headquarters: Alice Springs, Australia
- Key people: Edward Connellan (founder)

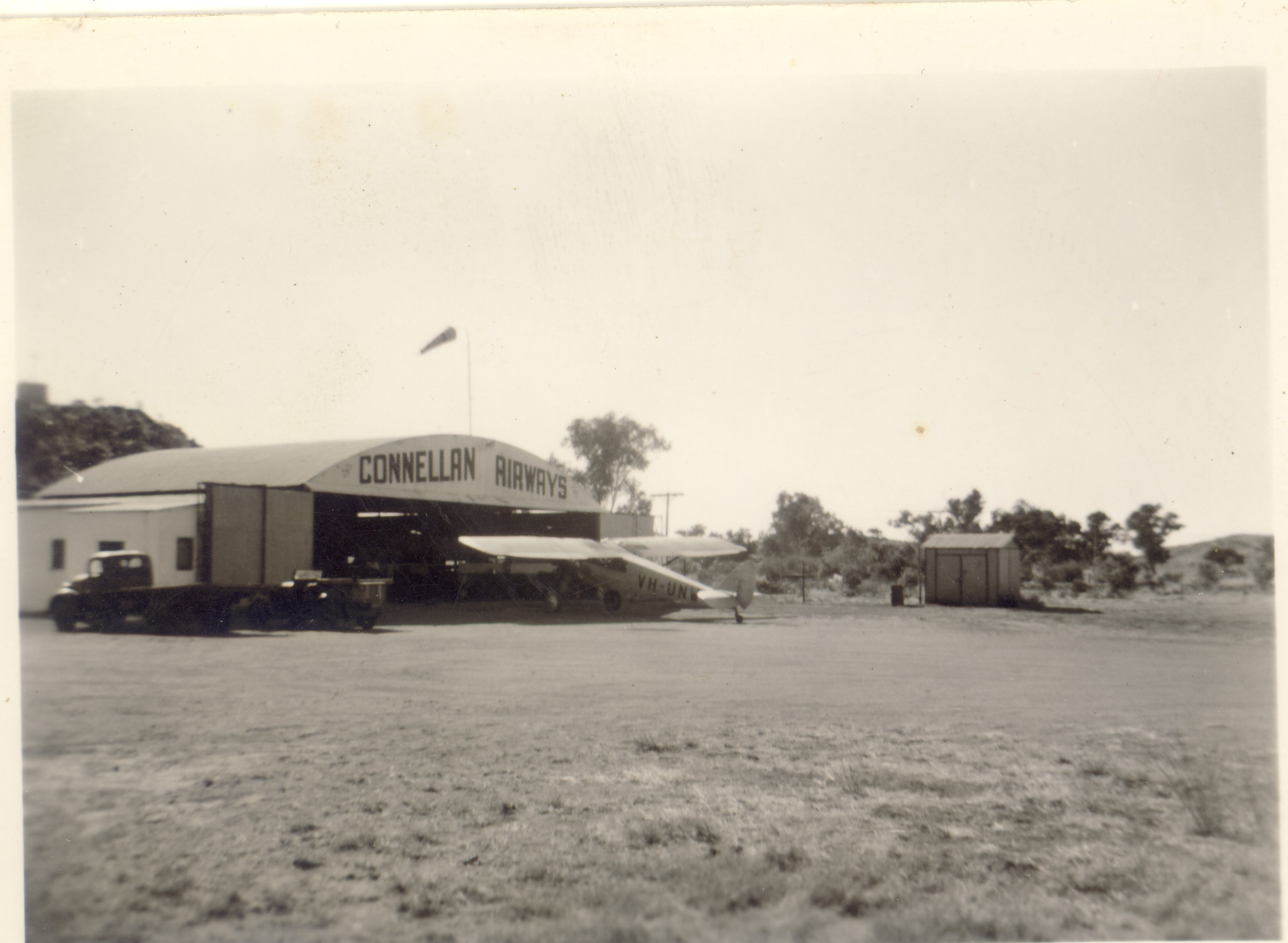
Hangar, Connellan Airways, Alice Springs, 1938 - 1948

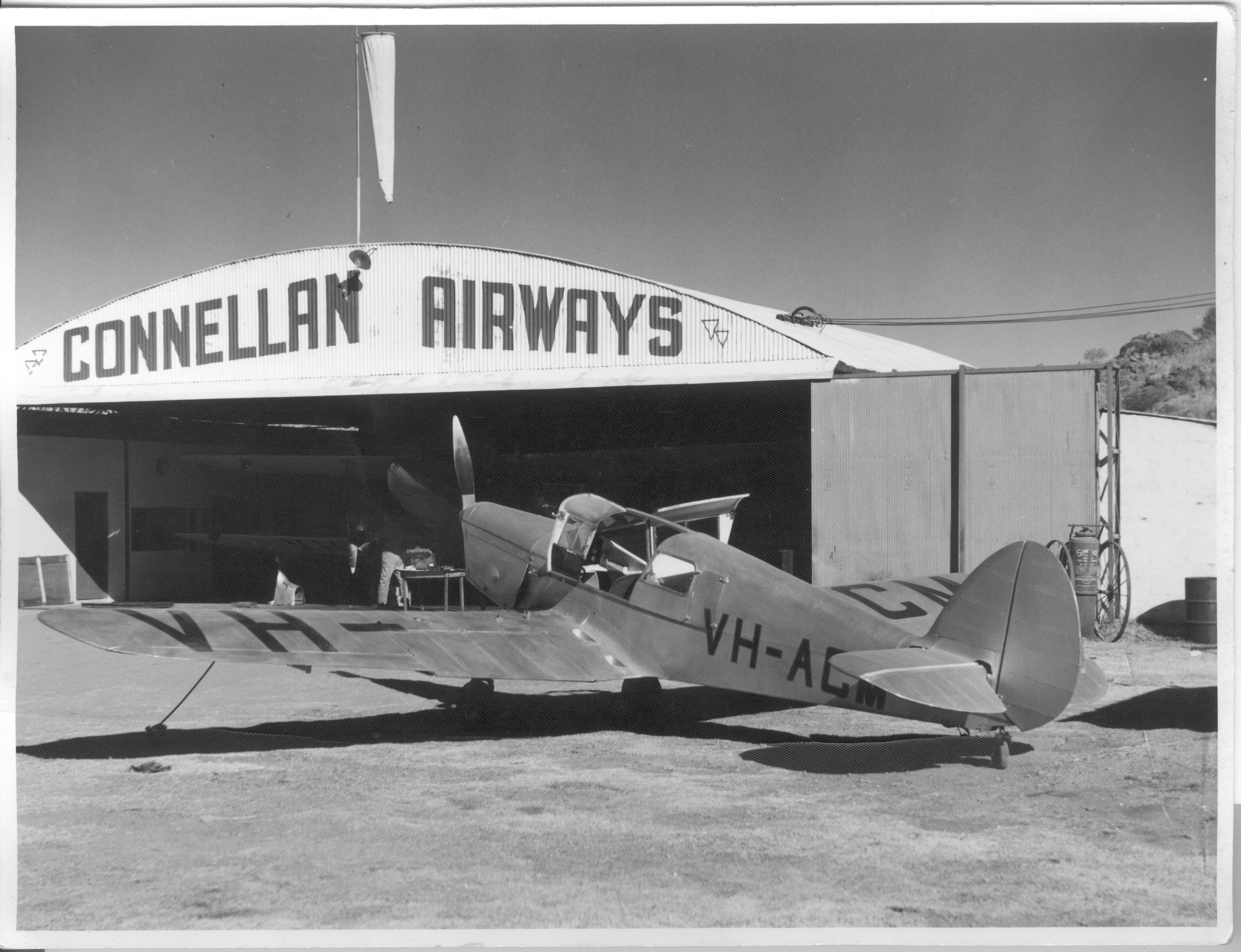
Percival Gull aeroplane VH-ACM outside Connellan Airways hangar, c1940s

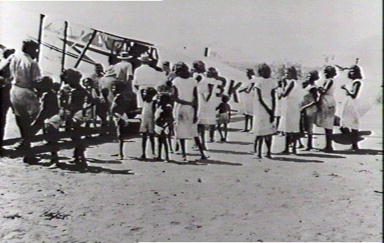
A Connellan Airways de Havilland Dragon Rapide visiting the Roper River Mission (1948).

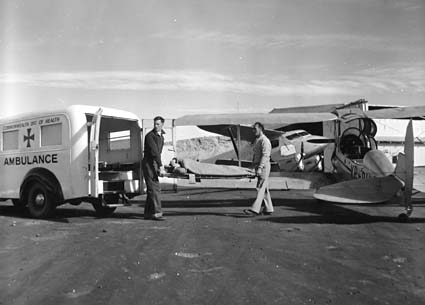
A Royal Flying Doctor Service patient is transferred from a Connellan Airways de Havilland Fox Moth to an ambulance (1954).

Connellan Airways (later Connair) was an airline headquartered in Alice Springs, Australia. It operated scheduled flights as well other air transport services throughout the Northern Territory from 1939 to 1980.

== History ==
The company was founded in 1939 as Survey & Inland Transport by Edward Connellan, an aviation pioneer. In 1938, Connellan had conducted two aerial surveys of the Northern Territory, and after discussion with John McEwen, the then responsible Federal Minister, undertook a fortnightly mail run between Alice Springs and Wyndham, Western Australia. He also signed a contract with the Royal Flying Doctor Service.

In the midst of World War II, Connellan consolidated his air services, which had grown viable and included more routes, and registered Connellan Airways on 23 July 1943. In the post-war years Connellan Airways grew, acquiring new routes and equipment. In February 1951 it became a limited company, with many of the shares held by station people and staff. In 1963 Connellan Airways became a regular public transport operator. The Royal Flying Doctor Service continued to charter Connellan Airways aircraft up to 1965, when it purchased two aircraft from the company, but continued using Connellan pilots until 1973.

In 1970 the company name was changed to Connair. Over the next decade, financial difficulties had to be faced. Subsequently, Connair was sold to East-West-Airlines on 14 March 1980 and renamed Northern Airlines; it went into liquidation in 1981. After the sale, the Connellan Airways Trust was set up, using some of the proceeds.

The Central Australia Aviation Museum is located in the original Connellan Airways Hangar. It is a part of the Araluen Cultural Precinct.

== Incidents and accidents ==
- On 20 January 1972, a Beechcraft 65-80 Queenair Aircraft (registered VH-CMI ) crashed upon departing Alice Springs Airport for a scheduled service to Ayers Rock, killing all on board, being the six passengers and pilot. It was later determined that the engine failure had caused a fire in the left wing during takeoff, and an intense fire weakened the structural integrity of the left wing attachment, and the left wing fell off before the pilot had had a reasonable chance to return to land - the pilot had reacted correctly.
- On 23 October 1975 - Connair Flight 1263, a Connair de Havilland Heron (registered VH-CLS) crashed during an approach to Cairns Airport following a scheduled passenger service from Mount Isa as Flight 1263, killing the eight passengers and three crew on board. It was later determined that the pilots had not adhered to the standard operational procedures for a missed approach when the airplane could not be properly aligned with the runway.
- On 5 January 1977, a former employee of the airline deliberately crashed a stolen Beechcraft Baron light aircraft into the Connair headquarters at Alice Springs Airport, in a suicide attack. Four other people were killed in the incident, among them Roger Connellan (son of founder Edward Connellan), and four were injured. This is known as the Connellan air disaster.

== Records ==
Many of the business records for Connellan Airways are held by Library & Archives NT; these include:

- NTRS 622, Flight manifests and trip records, 1941 - 1976
- NTRS 623, Civil aviation flight record books, 1939 - 1972
- NTRS 919, Administration, operations and traffic manuals, 1943 - 1976
- NTRS 920, Aircraft typed notes and service manuals, 1936 - 1976
- NTRS 981, General administrative, flight and promotional records, 1934 - 1980

There are also records held at the National Archives of Australia who have created the following fact sheet: Edward John Connellan and Connellan Airways.

== See also ==
- List of defunct airlines of Australia
- Aviation in Australia
