= Central Australian Aviation Museum =

Museum in Alice Springs, Australia

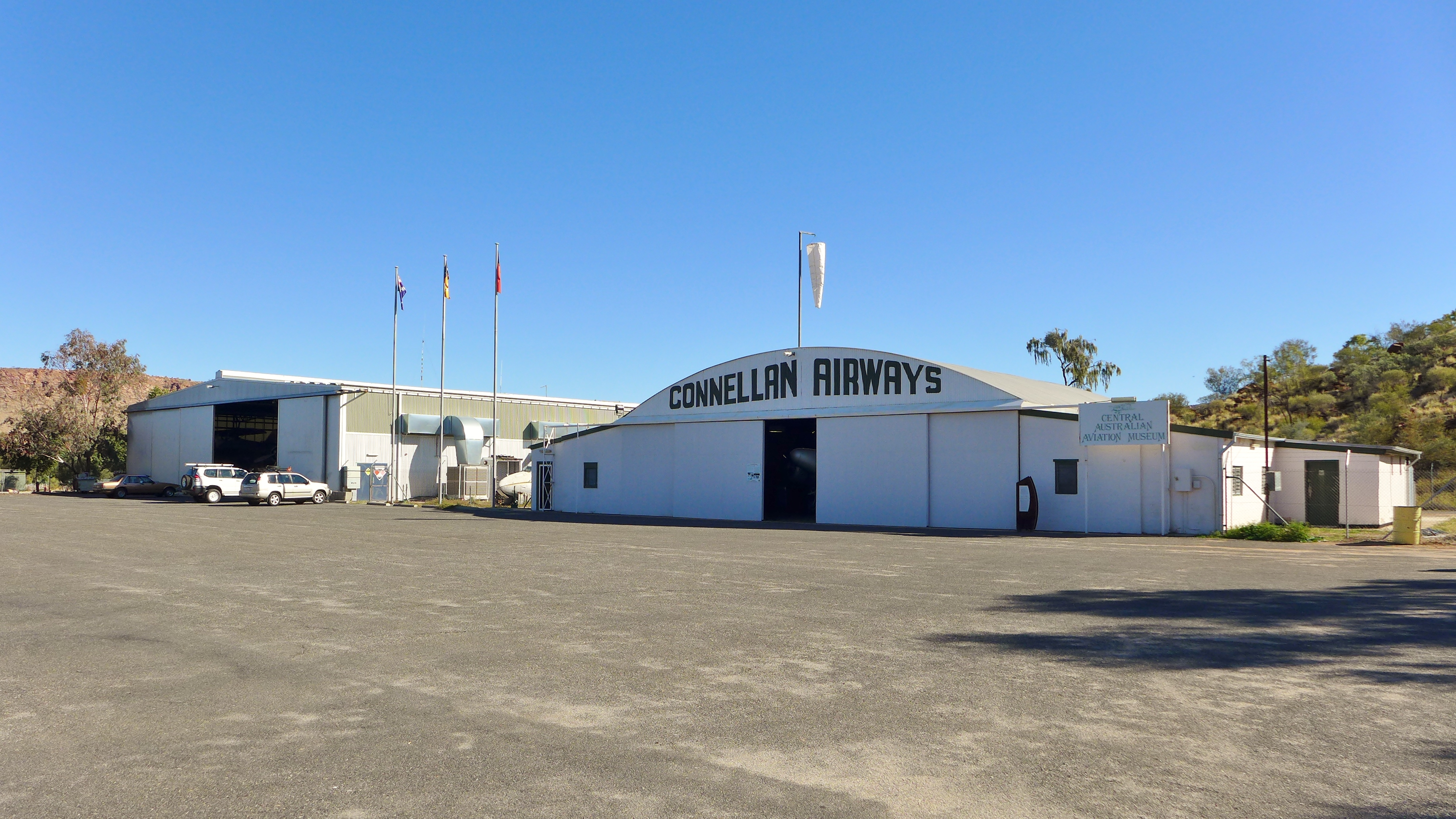
- General view of the museum
- Location: 6 Memorial Avenue, Gillen, Alice Springs NT; Australia
- Coordinates: 23°42′9.4″S 133°51′51.5″E
- Type: Aerospace
- Website: Central Australian Aviation Museum

The Central Australian Aviation Museum is an aviation museum in Alice Springs, Northern Territory, Australia.

== History ==
The current Museum Building was erected in 1940/41 and served as the main base of operations for Connellan Airways (later Connair) from 1939 to 1968. Due to the limitations of this Townsite Aerodrome for larger aircraft operations and the expansion of Alice Springs, the move to the present airport was eventually forced upon Connellan Airways. The larger Bellman Hangar, which occupied the site next to the present hangar was moved to the present airport and all operations ceased at Townsite by June 1968.

The Townsite Hangar was left derelict and the air strips disappeared under the rapid expansion of Alice Springs. The houses and road fronting the Museum are on the old main runway. By 1977 little trace could be found of the runways, and the Townsite Hangar was in a sad state of repair, having had no maintenance for 9 years. It had become a haven for those without ready accommodation and its interior and exterior had been a target for vandals.

The founding of the Central Australian Aviation Museum in 1977 soon changed this situation.

A very active voluntary committee was formed following the suicide flight at Alice Springs Airport in January 1977. It was not long before the Hangar was reclaimed and work commenced on its renovation. This early start could not have been made without the support of many people previously associated with Townsite. Many of these people joined the new Museum and willingly paid $50 membership without question or guarantee.

This immediate response allowed the Museum to rapidly find its feet and open its doors in May, 1979. Financial assistance from the Northern Territory Government was crucial in establishing the Museum.

Since 1979 many more exhibits have been acquired, such as aircraft, engines, components, historical photographs, papers, and videos.

In March 1984 the collection was officially handed over to the Northern Territory Museums and Arts Galleries Board who have accepted responsibility for its preservation, presentation and administration. It is now possible for people to visit the Museum free of charge and find out for themselves the story of 'Townsite Alice Springs' and the role it played in the development of Central Australia.

== Collection ==
List of aircraft exhibited in the Central Australian Aviation Museum:

- de Havilland Australia Drover
- Douglas DC-3
- de Havilland Dove
- CAC Wackett (the historic VH-BEC)
- Schneider ES-52
- Auster J/1B Aiglet
- Beechcraft Model 18
- Percival Proctor
- de Havilland Heron
- Westland Widgeon (the historic Kookaburra)

== Gallery ==
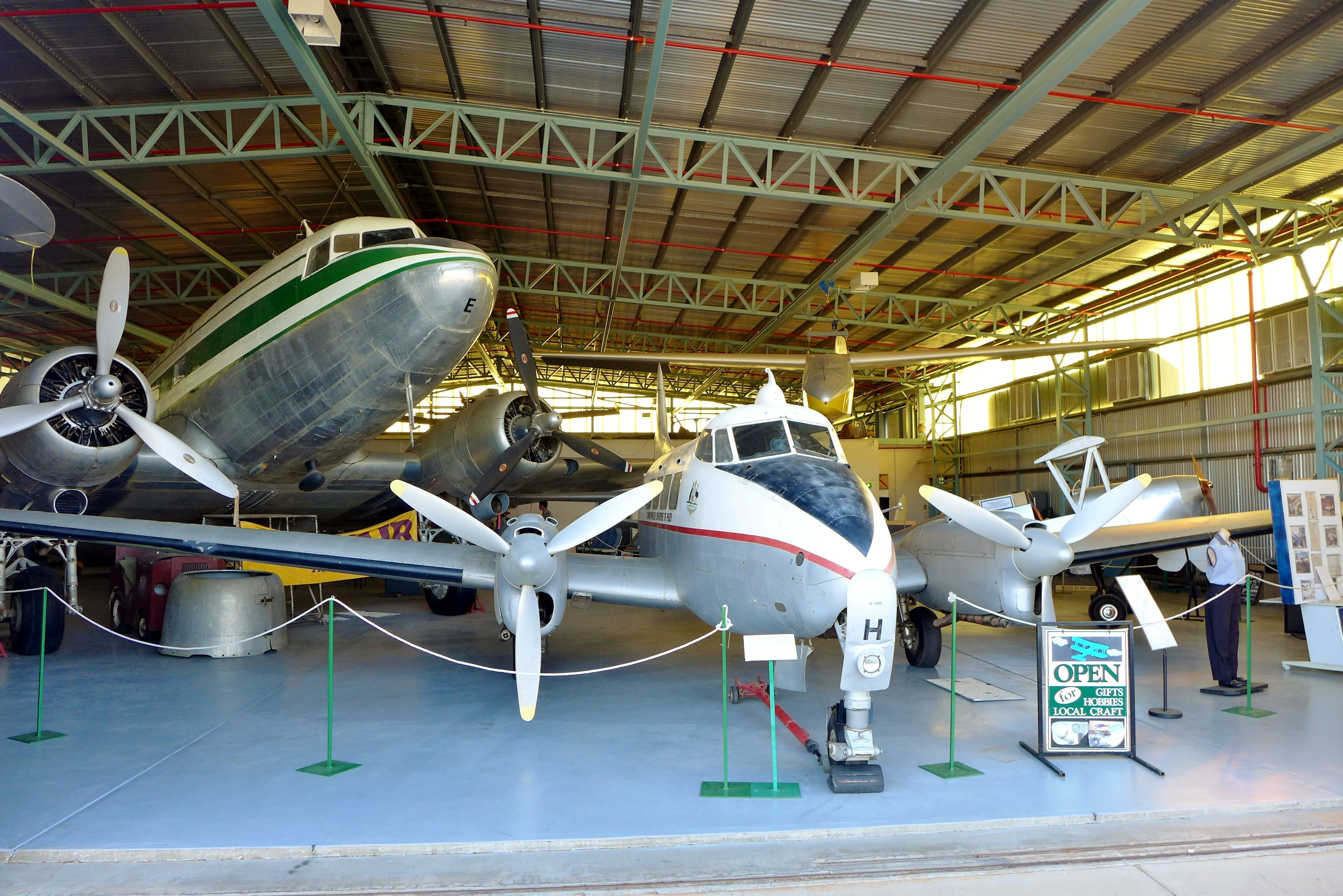
General view

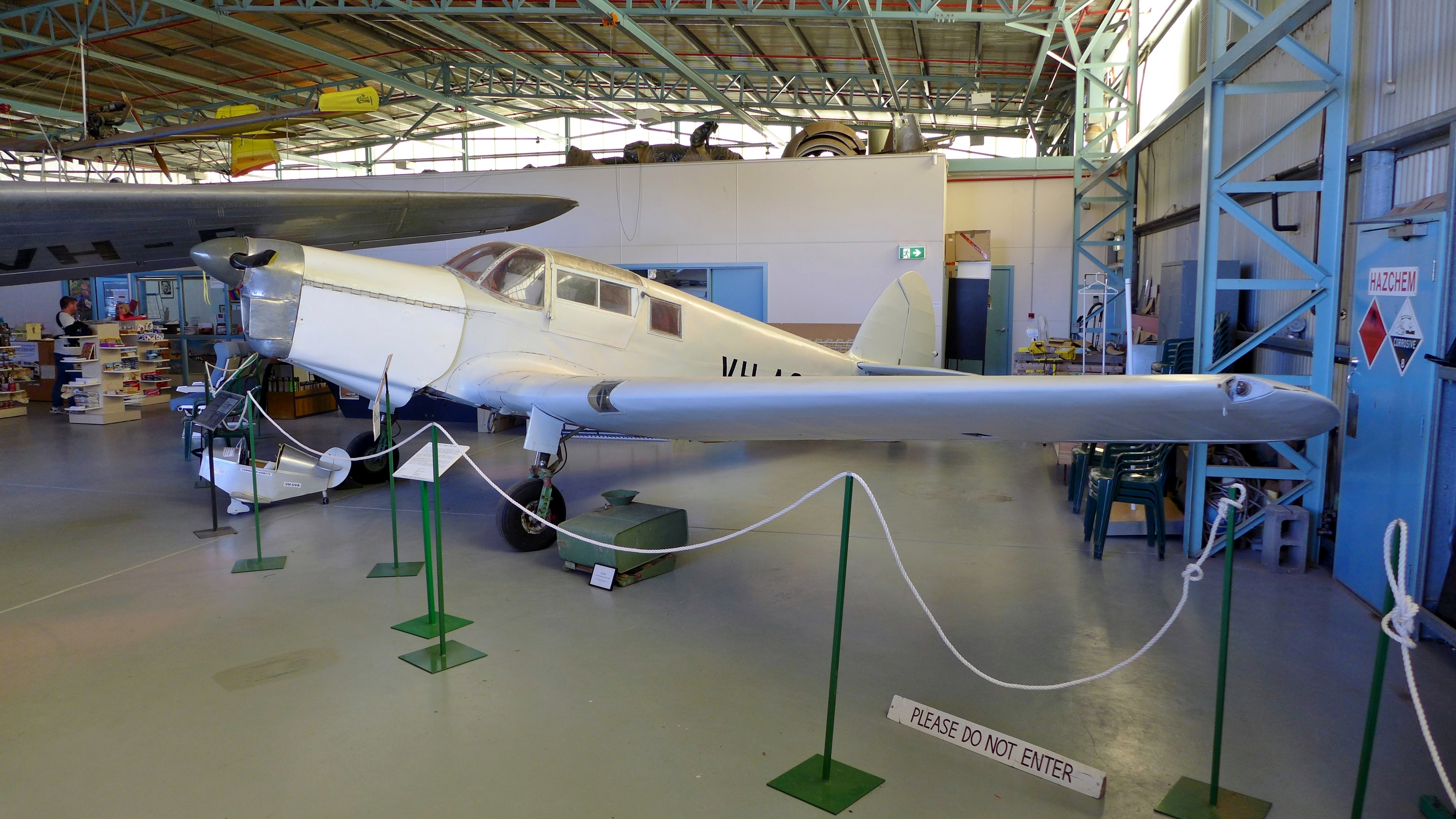
Percival Proctor

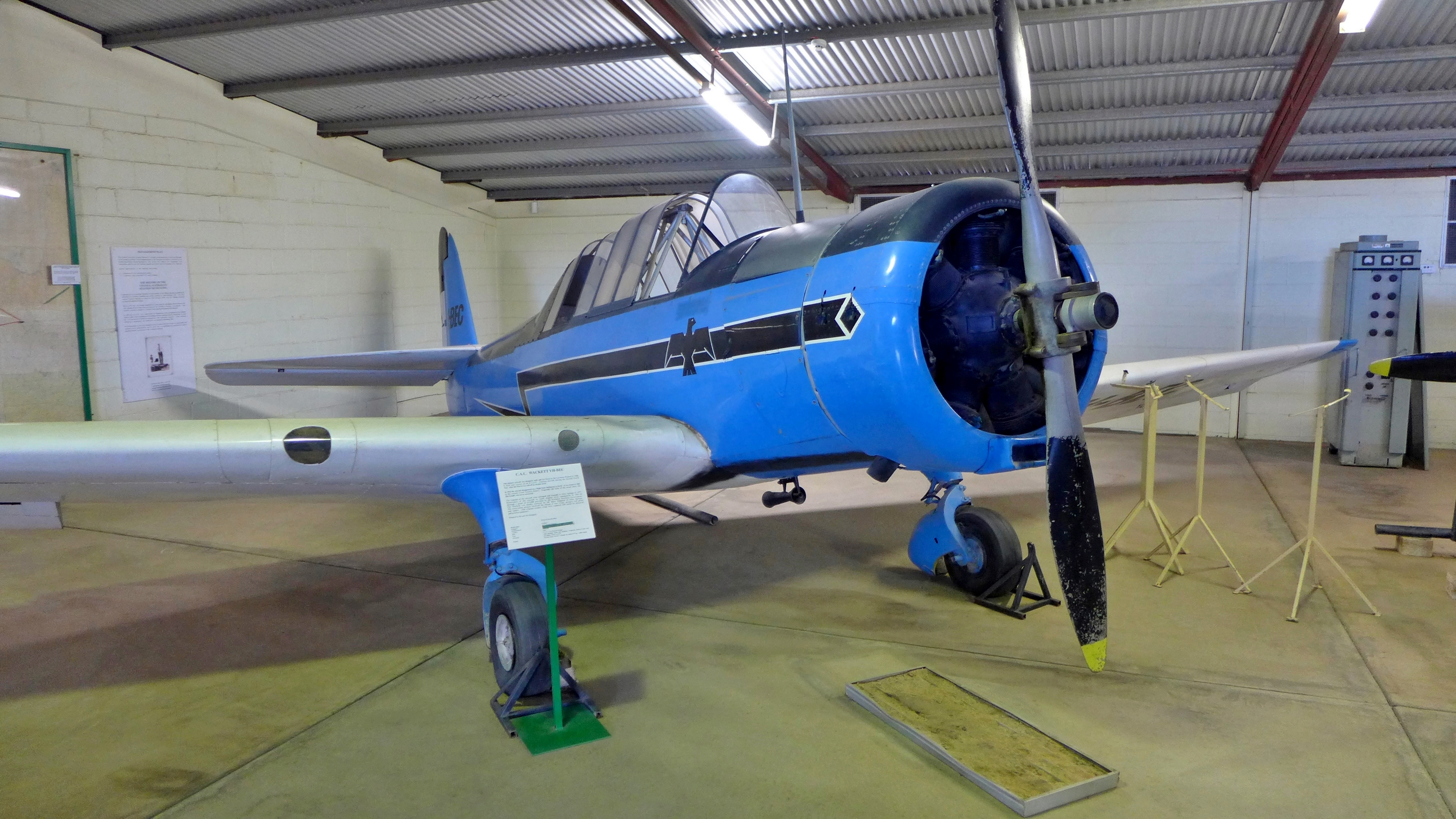
CAC Wackett

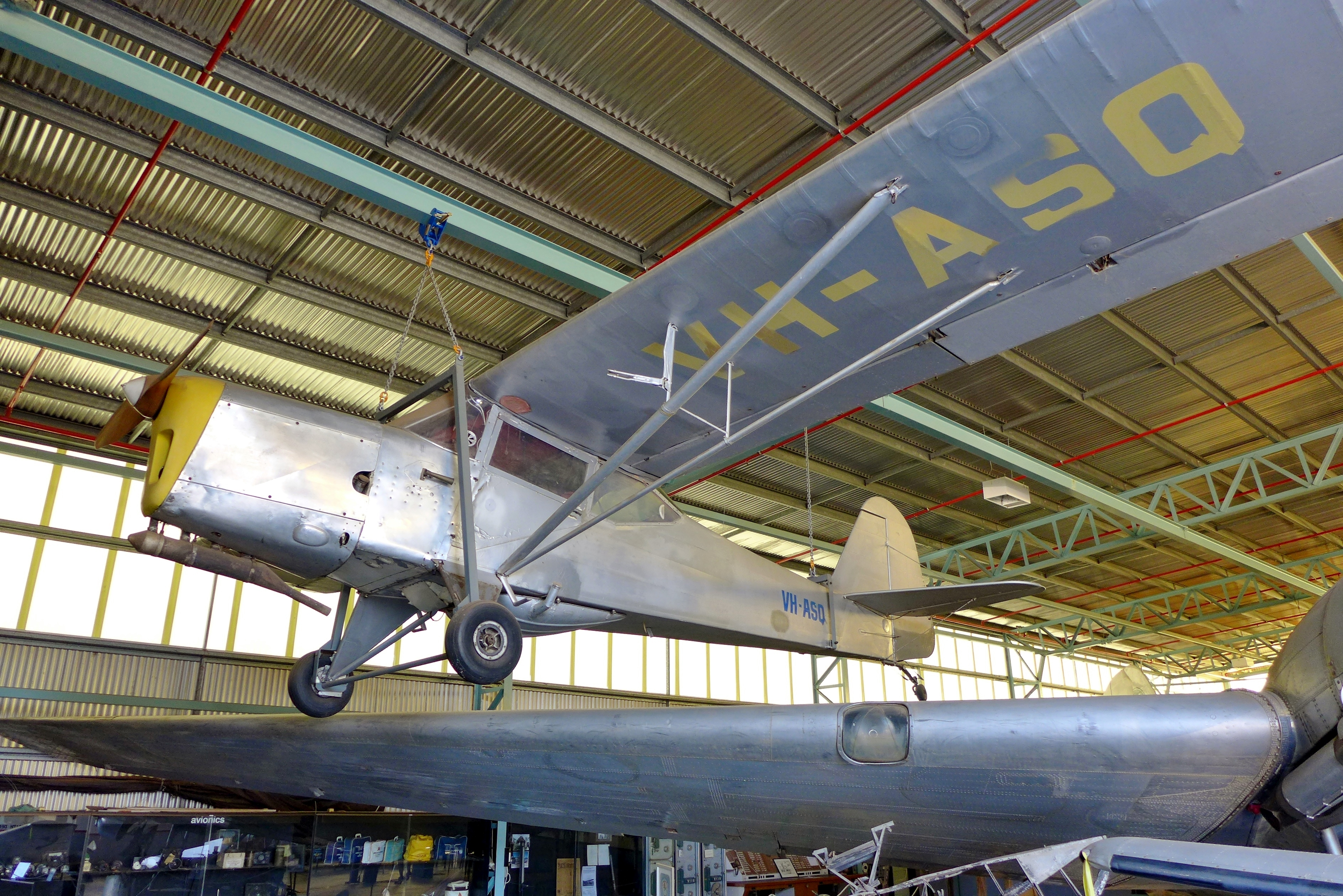
Auster J/1B Aiglet

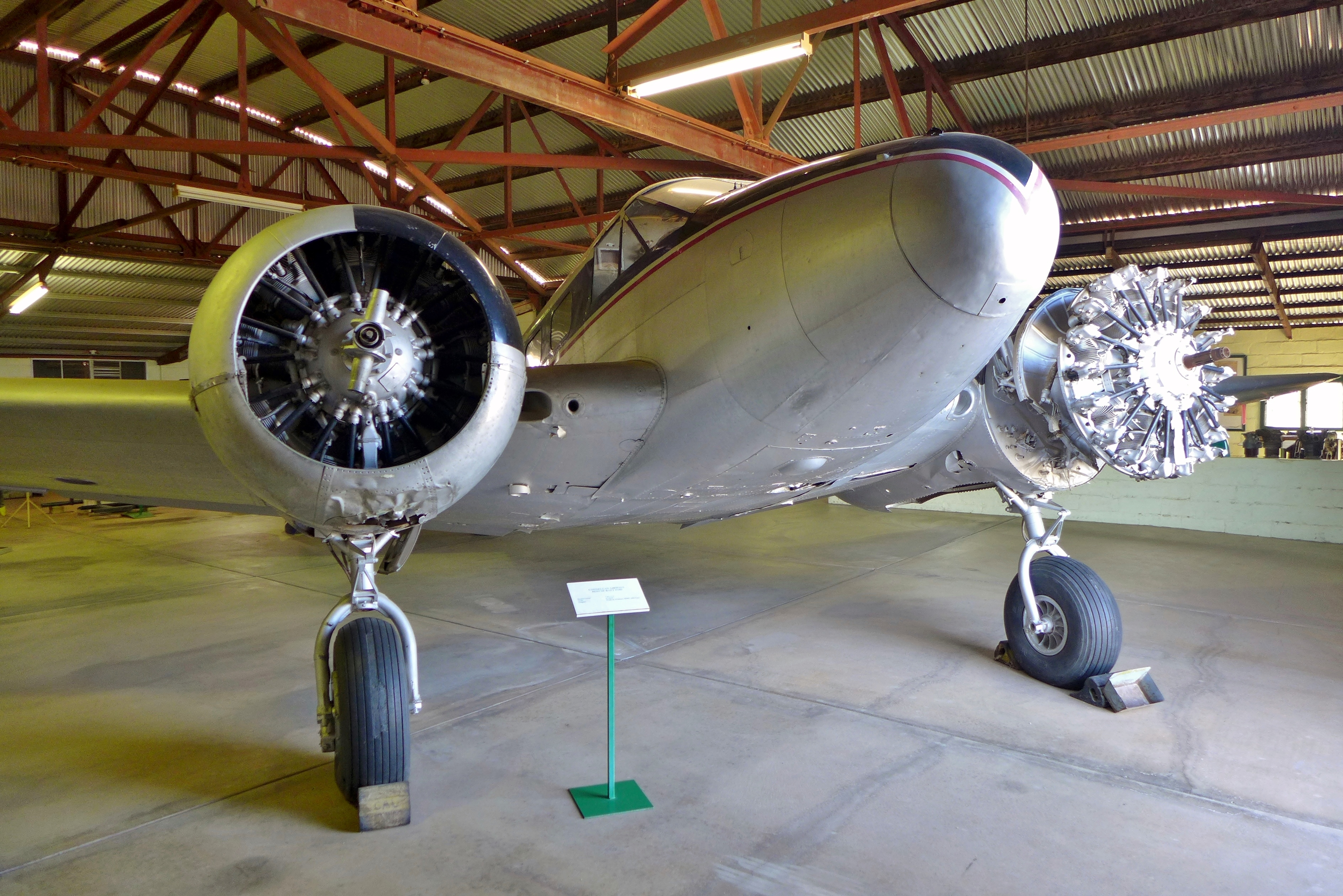
Beechcraft Model 18

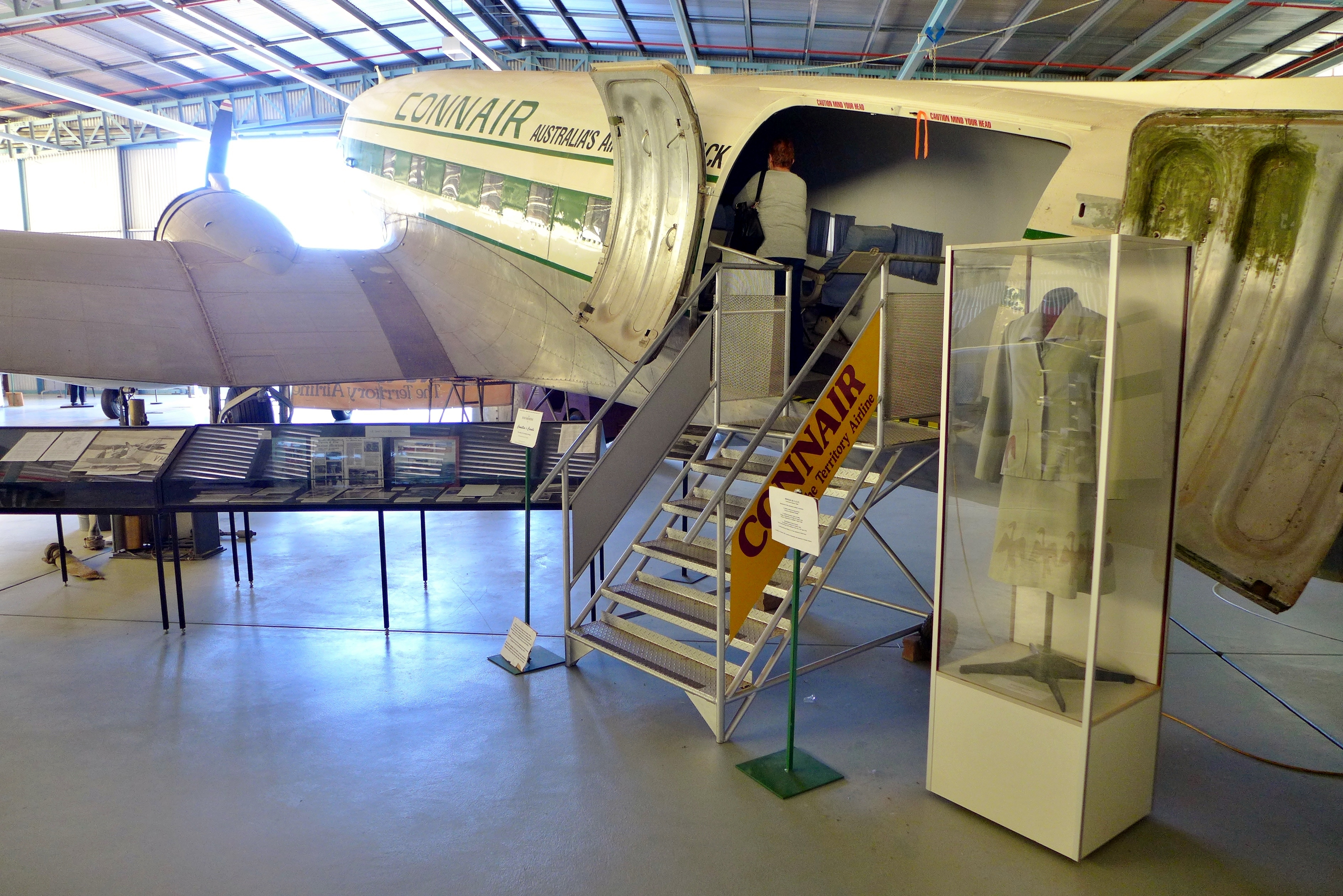
Douglas DC-3

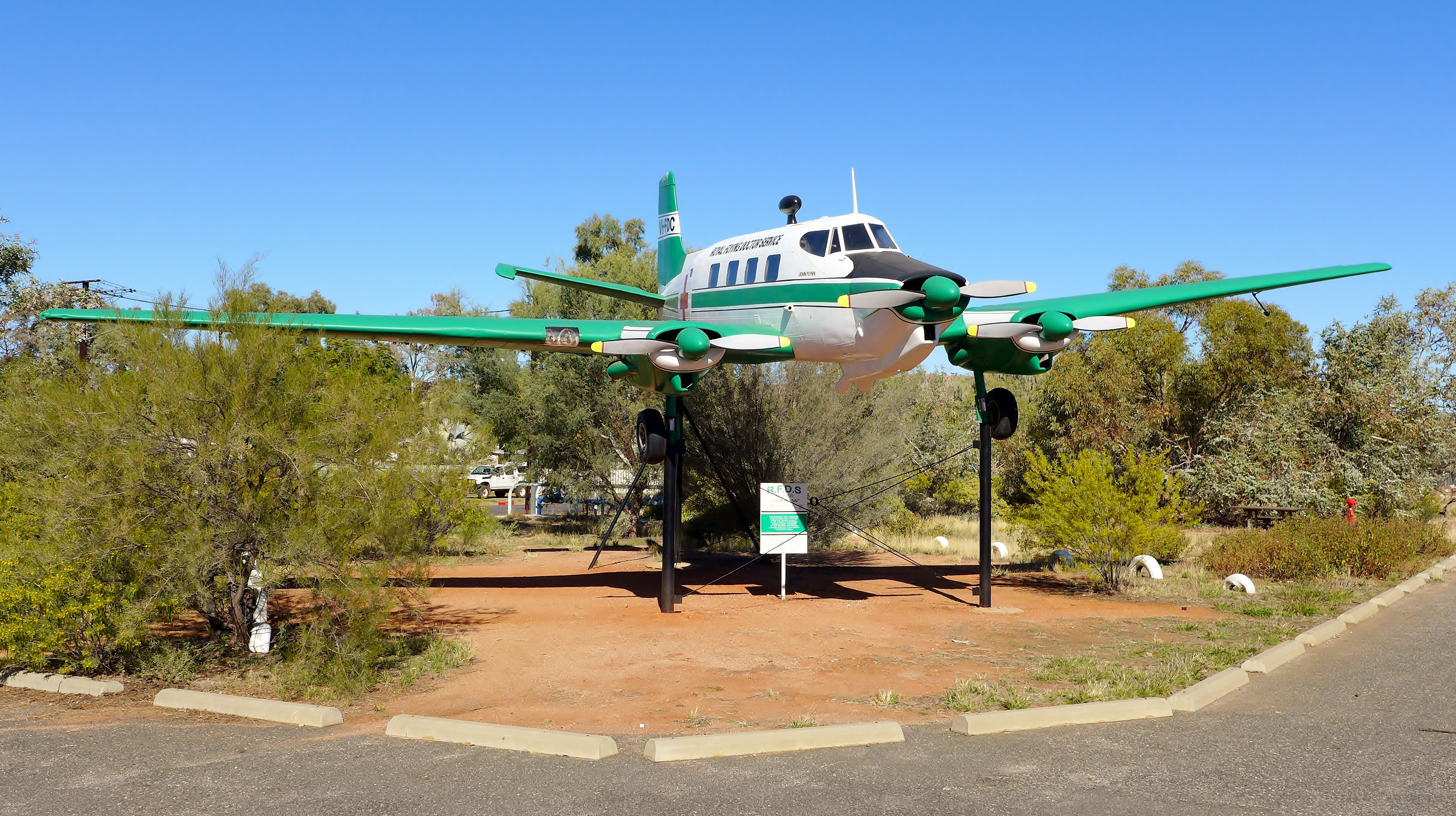
de Havilland Australia DHA-3 Drover

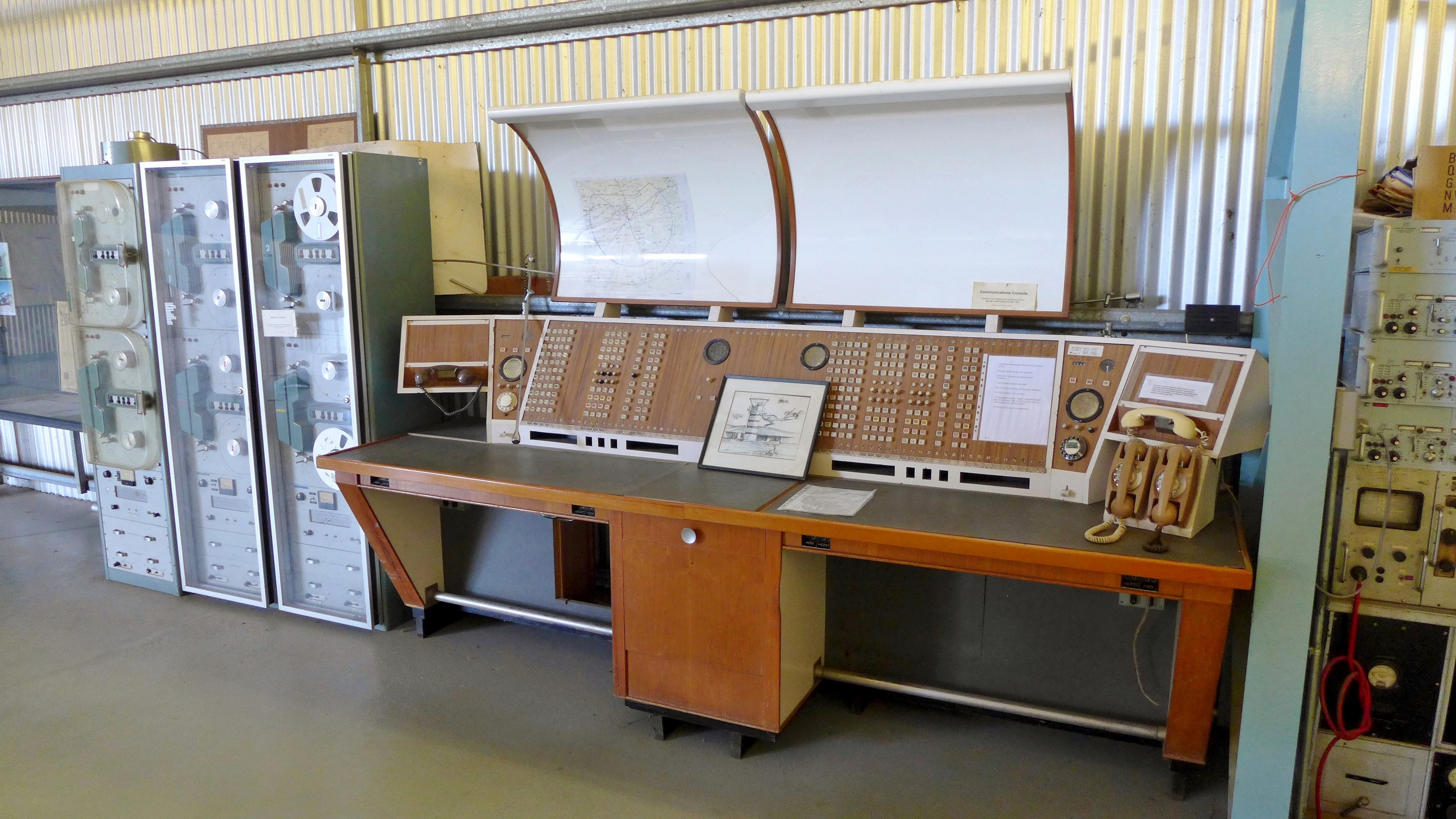
Communications console previously located in Alice Springs Airport

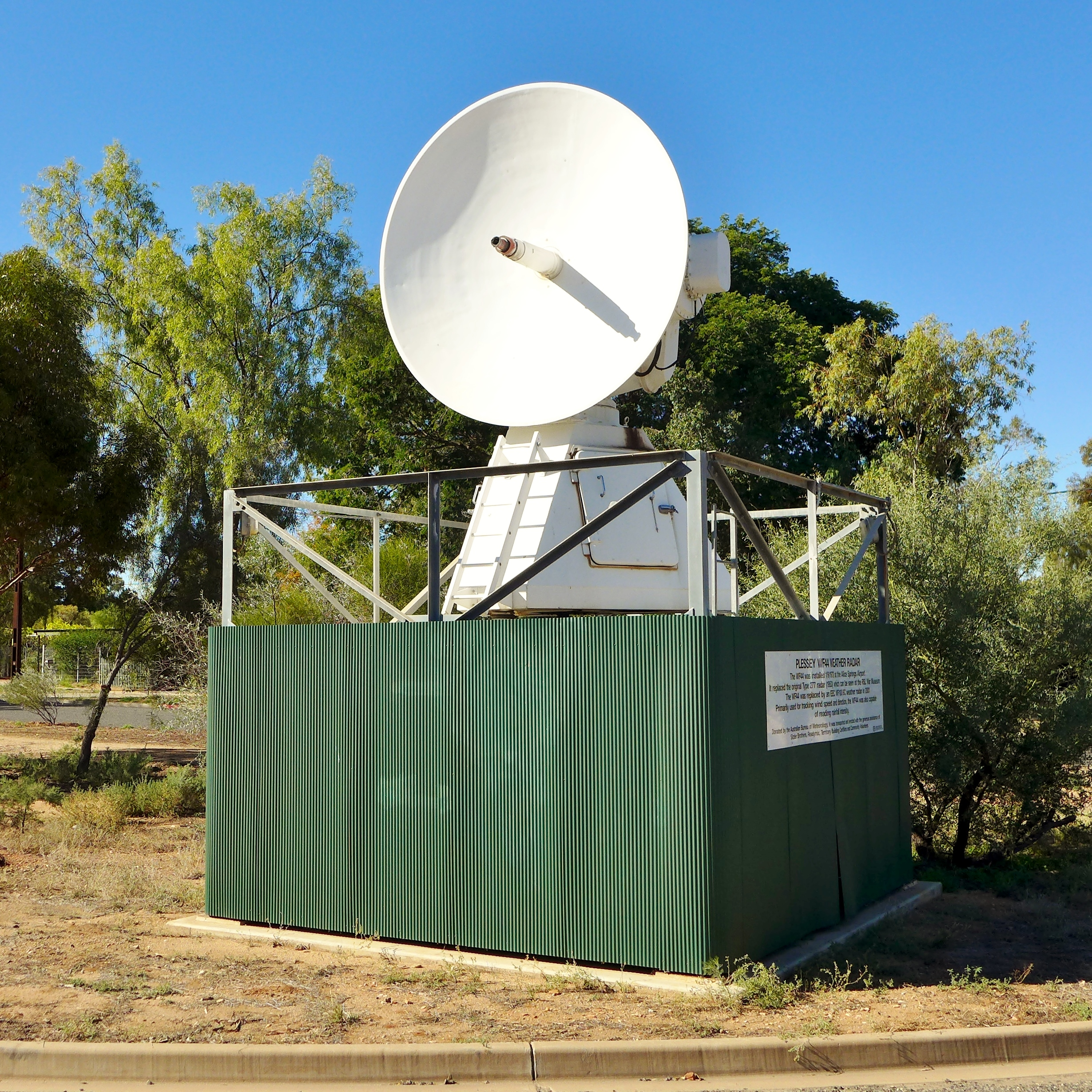
Plessey WF44 weather radar

== See also ==
- Araluen Cultural Precinct
- List of aerospace museums
