= Alice Springs Airport =

Airport serving Alice Springs, Australia

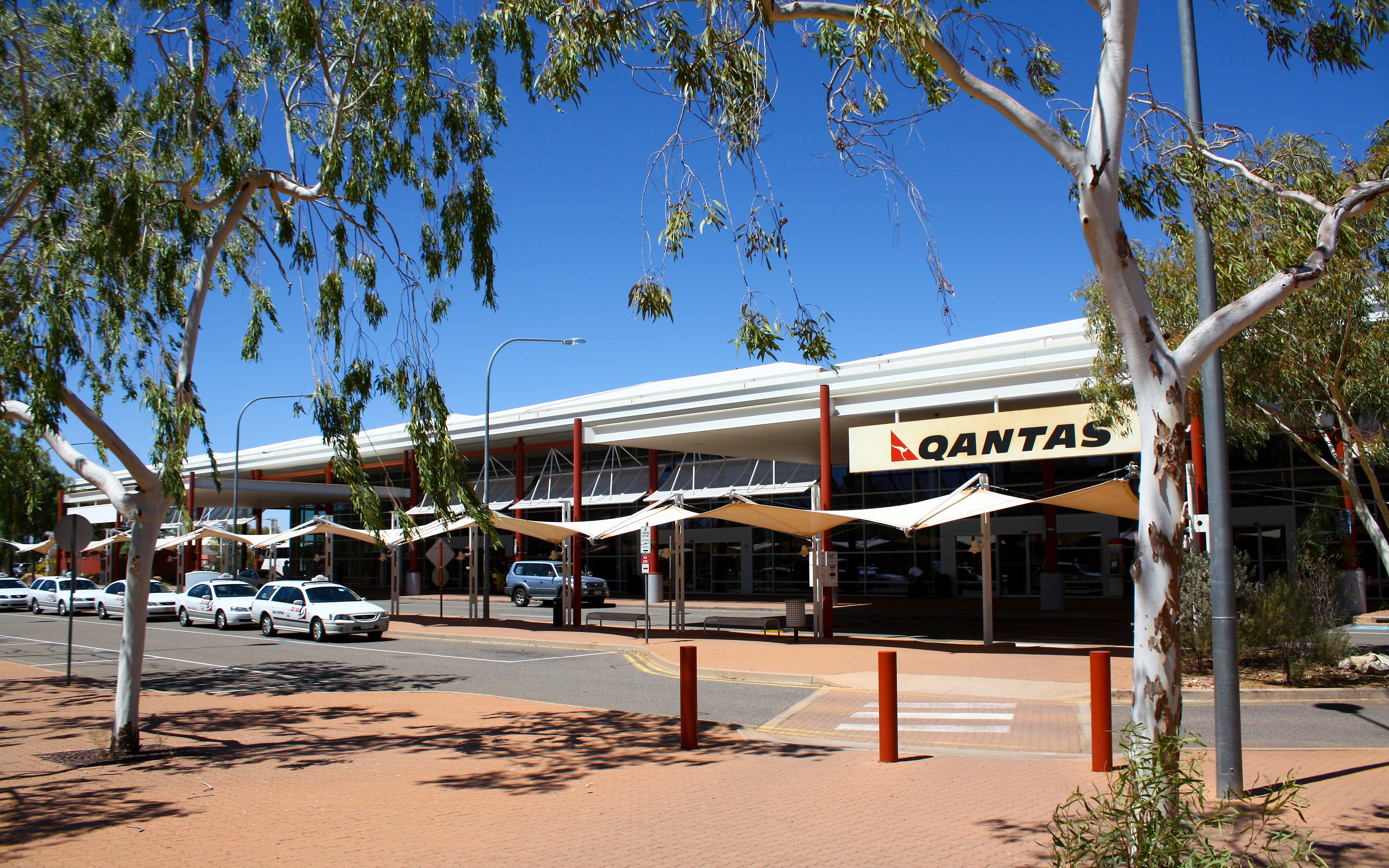
- IATA: ASP; ICAO: YBAS

Summary
- Airport type: Public
- Owner: Northern Territory Airports Pty Ltd
- Operator: Alice Springs Airport Pty Ltd
- Serves: Alice Springs, Northern Territory
- Location: Connellan, Northern Territory
- Elevation AMSL: 1,789 ft (545 m)
- Coordinates: 23°48′25″S 133°54′08″E
- Website: alicespringsairport.com.au

Maps
- Location in the Northern Territory
- Interactive map of Alice Springs Airport

Runways
Direction	Length		Surface
Direction	m	ft	Surface
12/30	2,438	7,999	Asphalt
17/35	1,133	3,717	Asphalt

Statistics (2016/17)
- Passenger movements: ▲617,186
- Aircraft movements: ▲7,195
- Sources: Australian AIP and aerodrome chart. Passenger and aircraftmovements from the Department of Infrastructure and Transport

Alice Springs Airport (IATA: ASP, ICAO: YBAS) is a regional domestic airport located in Connellan, Northern Territory, 7 nautical miles (13 km; 8.1 mi) south of the town of Alice Springs. The busiest and primary airport serving Central Australia, Alice Springs Airport is the 24th busiest airport in Australia with a total of 356,813 passengers in the 2024–25 financial year.

The airport operates with two runways, of which the larger can accommodate widebody aircraft such as the Airbus A380 and Boeing 747, although not a fully laden take offs due to high temperatures and the runway length. The only scheduled flights using the airport are domestic, although international charters do use the airport on occasion.

The facility is extensively used to launch stratospheric research balloons; the runways used for a balloon launch are closed for aircraft traffic during the balloon launch process. Alice Springs Airport is not subject to a curfew, and operates 24 hours a day.

== Infrastructure ==
The airport has two runways with lengths of 2438 and 1133 meters. There are nine parking positions for commercial aircraft on the apron; passengers usually walk from the aircraft to the terminal.

The airport consists of a 10,000 m² terminal built in 1991.

The town is connected to the city by taxi and shuttle bus services. Numerous international car rental companies are also located there.

A small shopping area offers local Aboriginal crafts, opals and gemstones, Outback sportswear, books and magazines, as well as a standing cafe with beer and snacks.

Due to the low humidity, the airport has parking positions for grounded commercial aircraft. During the COVID-19 pandemic, it included space for the Airbus A380.

== History ==
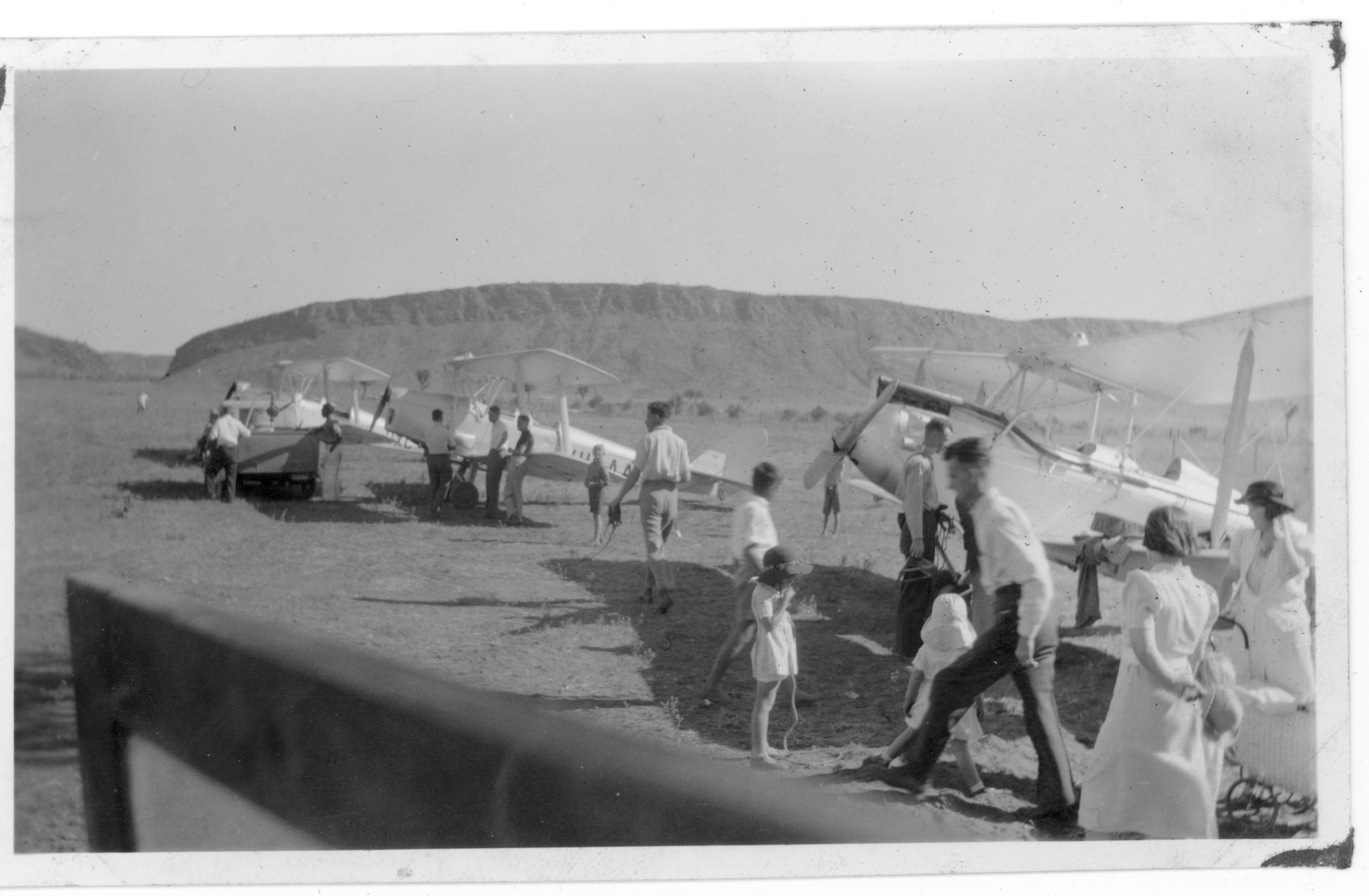
The aerodrome in Alice Springs, c1937

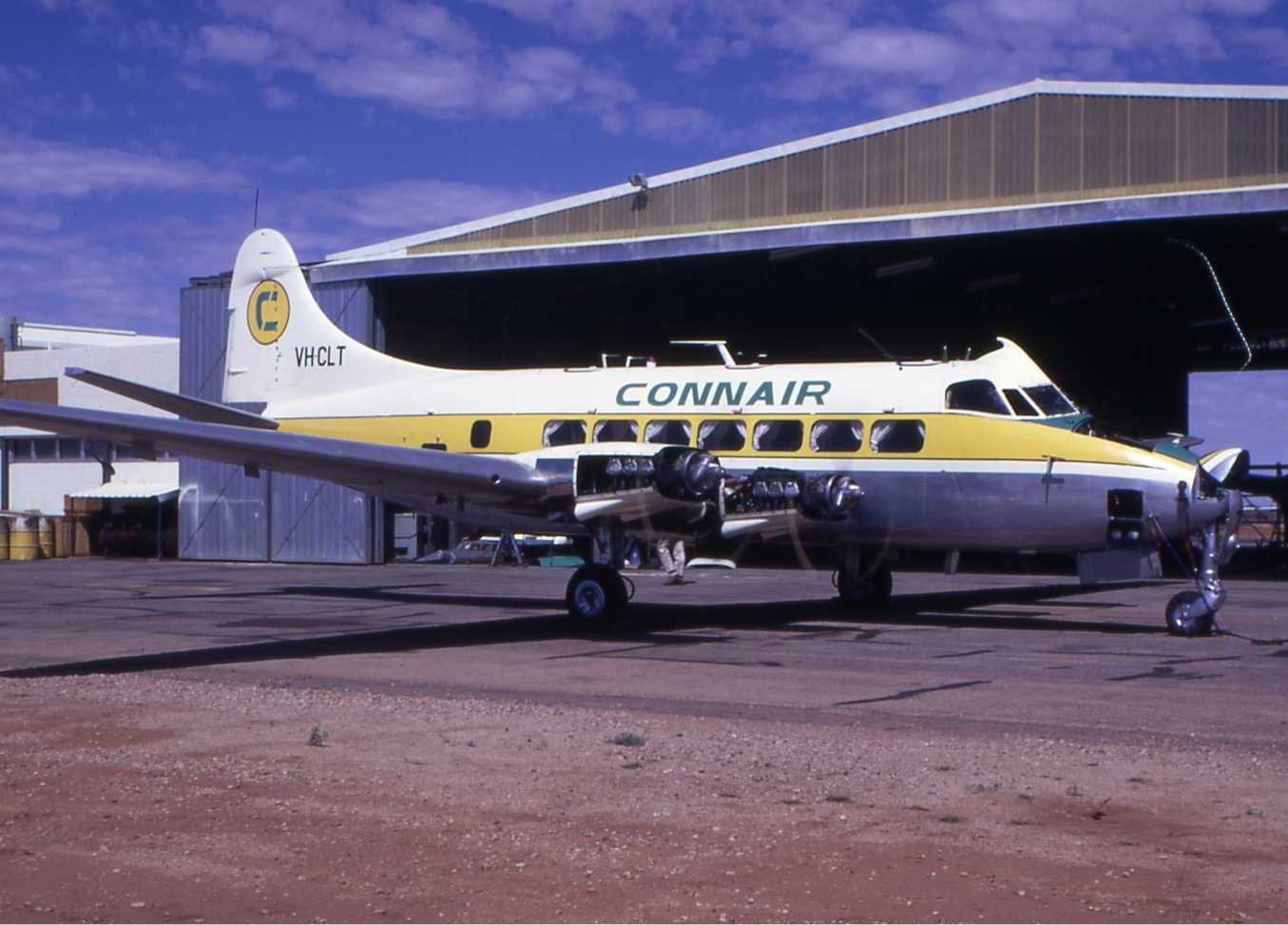
A Connair DH-114 at Alice Springs, early 1970s

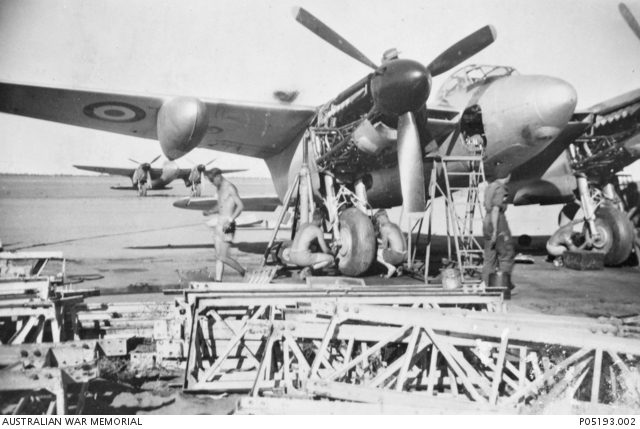
A De Havilland Mosquito of No 87 Squadron RAAF at Alice Springs in 1950

On 5 October 1921, the first aircraft landed at Alice Springs, near the site where Eddie Connellen would later establish an aerodrome and founded Connellan Airways (later to become Connair) in 1939. As the town grew, the airport, known locally as "townsite aerodrome" was unable to handler larger and heavier aircraft.

The present airport, originally Seven Mile Aerodrome, was originally built in 1940 by the Australian Department of Defence and was used primarily by the Royal Australian Air Force. The airport became an important staging point for military aircraft supporting the allied campaign in the Dutch East Indies, and was an operational RAAF base from 1942 until 1946. No. 57 Operational Base Unit (RAAF) ran and maintained the aerodrome.

After the war, most civilian operations transferred to the Seven Mile Aerodrome. Trans-Australia Airlines began a weekly Douglas DC-3 flight between Alice Springs and Adelaide in November 1947. Weekly Ansett flights to Melbourne commenced in 1960, while TAA established a permanent presence in Alice Springs from 1961. Connellan Airways continued to operate out of their own facilities at the townsite aerodrome until 1968, which is now the site of the Central Australian Aviation Museum.

In 1958, it was officially renamed Alice Springs Airport. The terminal moved to the current site in 1964, the same year the airport's fire station was built. Both opened in 1965 The main runway was extended to its present length of 2,438 m (7,999 ft) in 1961. A new control tower was completed in 1969, coinciding with the closure of the townsite aerodrome and remaining traffic there moving to the main Alice Springs Airport.

Frequent visitor to Alice Springs, British businessman Alistair McAlpine (1942–2014), wrote in his memoir of the impression the new airport had on him in a May 1994 visit:

Only when I climbed down the airport steps did I begin to think I had come to the wrong place. A sign said 'International Airport' and that is what I saw. Gone were the collection of buildings stitched together that had passed for a terminal. In front of me was the modern airport building–there was no longer a grubby bar with grubby customers where sweat and stubble mixed with ice-cold beer; the flies had gone too. The cafeteria could seat a hundred and needed to, for planes arrived every few minutes instead of once or twice a day (..) The days when the population of 'The Alice' came to the airport for a beer and to wonder at the miracle of flight are long gone.

=== Units based at Seven Mile Aerodrome ===
- No. 57 Operational Base Unit RAAF ran and maintained the between 1941 and 1946.
- Elements of No. 87 Squadron RAAF were based at the aerodrome for a short period to undertake aerial topographic survey work after World War II.

=== Asia Pacific Aircraft Storage ===
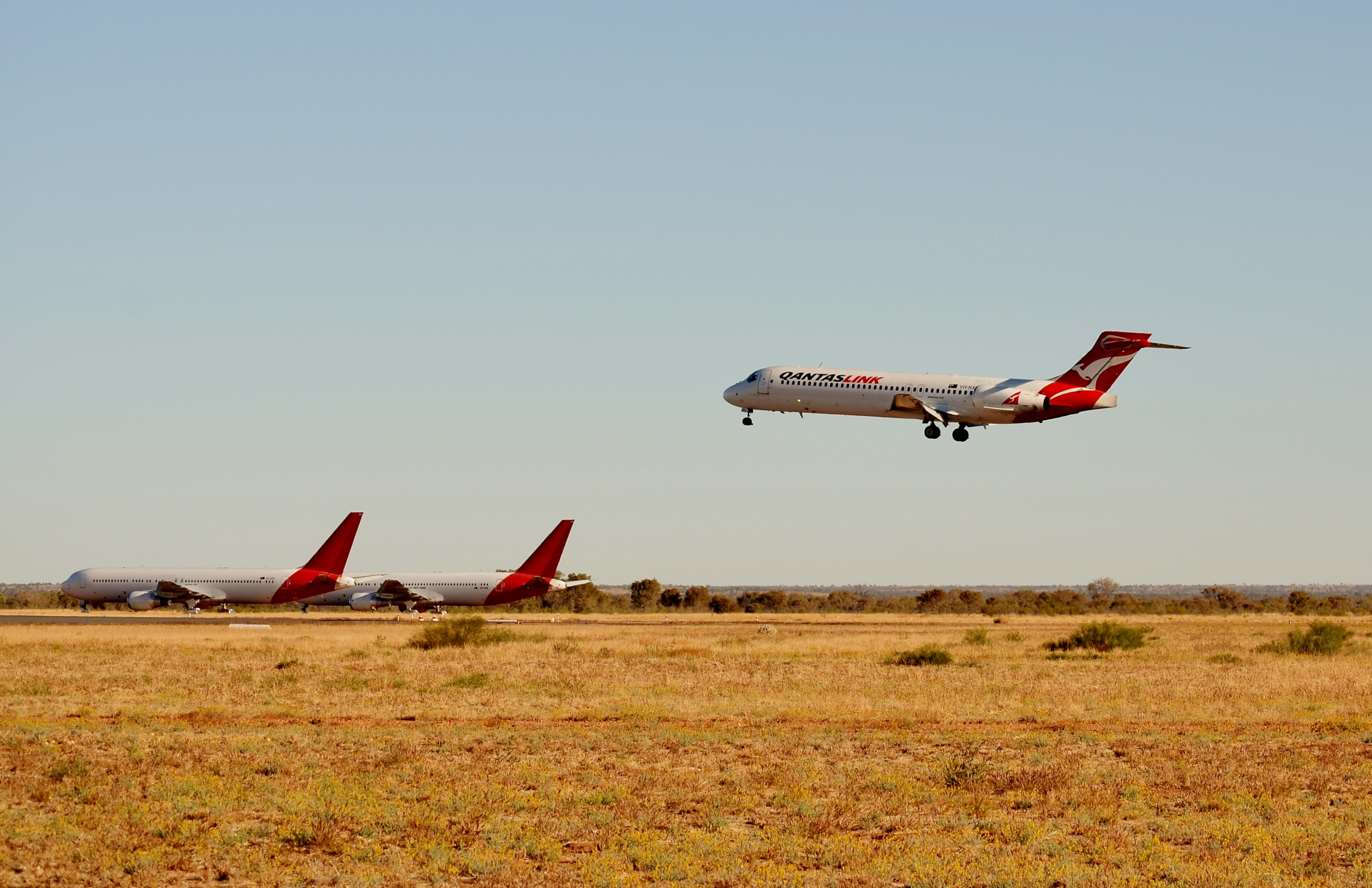
A QantasLink Boeing 717 landing with the boneyard in the background

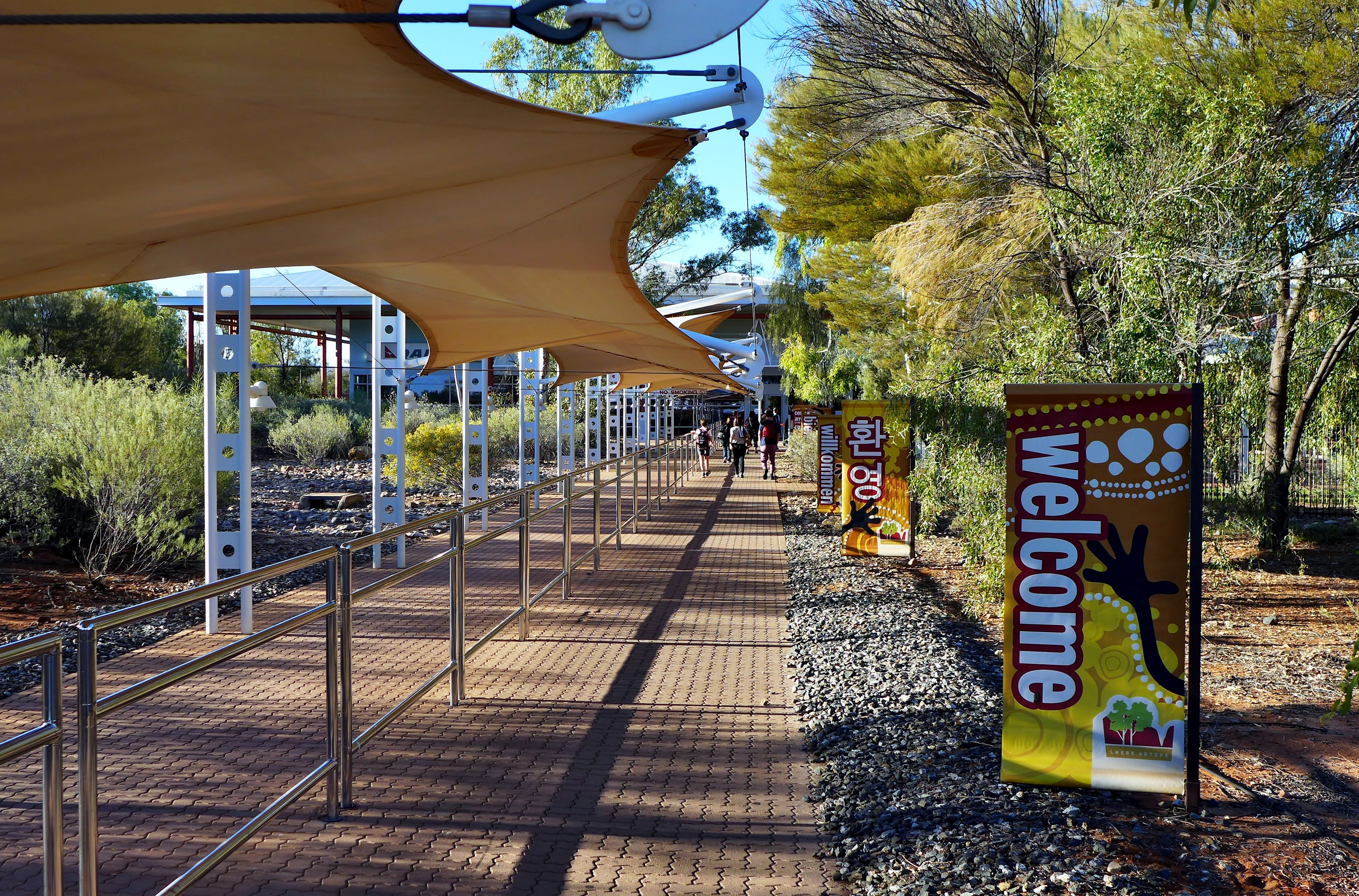
Walkway from the apron to the terminal

On 27 May 2011, it was announced that Alice Springs Airport had been selected to be the first large-scale aircraft boneyard outside the United States.

The facility, which commenced operation in June 2014, is operated by Asia Pacific Aircraft Storage Ltd. The dry arid climate of Alice Springs is similar to Arizona, a major hub for aircraft storage and preservation. The facility is designed to store commercial aircraft not in use, as well as stripping and recycling retired aircraft components.

On 30 September 2020, it was announced that the facility was close to its current capacity and would be expanded from around 100 aircraft to up to 200 aircraft. At the height of the pandemic, 152 aircraft were stored at Alice Springs, the last returning to operational service with Cathay Pacific in June 2024.

== Airlines and destinations ==
Airlines	Destinations
Airnorth	Cairns, Darwin, Perth, Tennant Creek
Qantas	Sydney
QantasLink	Adelaide, Brisbane, Darwin
Virgin Australia	Adelaide

== Statistics ==
=== Total annual passengers ===
Alice Springs Airport statistics
Year	Domestic passengers	Aircraft movements
1985	493,598	6,974
1986	598,888	8,197
1987	689,063	10,106
1988	730,670	9,659
1989	501,180	6,709
1990	658,056	9,092
1991	712,328	10,113
1992	740,469	10,647
1993	855,146	12,081
1994	933,049	13,375
1995	908,772	13,628
1996	823,697	13,008
1997	782,529	13,260
1998	796,021	13,009
1999	790,625	12,587
2000	759,274	11,929
2001	635,715	10,053
2002	554,234	7,370
2003	586,417	7,882
2004	609,908	7,536
2005	599,080	7,255
2006	618,889	6,735
2007	623,525	6,150
2008	650,880	6,623
2009	674,901	6,648
2010	668,844	6,864
2011	598,749	6,670
2012	579,752	6,459
2013	655,245	6,959
2014	621,069	6,770
2015	593,510	6,808
2016	612,174	7,223
2017	618,494	7,250
2018	621,412	7,580
2019	554,544	6,510
2020	209,233	3,404
2021	259,548	4,645
2022	344,191	4,579
2023	354,069	4,967
2024	371,784	5,361

=== Domestic ===
Busiest domestic routes – Alice Springs Airport (year ending December 2019)
Rank	Airport	Passengers	% change
1	Adelaide	144,600	▲11.0%
2	Darwin	109,700	0.0%

== Accidents and incidents ==
- A Pel-Air IAI 1124 Westwind operating a cargo flight from Tindal Airport crashed into the Ilparpa Range while attempting an instrument approach for runway 12 on 27 April 1995, killing the two pilots and a company passenger.
- On 16 December 2000, a mentally ill man broke into the hangar of the Alice Springs Aero Club, climbed into a Piper Warrior aeroplane belonging to the club and was able to start the engine. Despite having no formal flight training, the man was able to taxi the aircraft to the runway and take off under the cover of darkness at around 5am. Shortly after becoming airborne, the aircraft impacted the ground approximately 2 km (1.2 mi) east of the airport, fatally injuring the pilot. The accident was investigated by the Northern Territory Police and evidence heard during the subsequent coronial inquiry revealed the offender had on a previous occasion been apprehended at Darwin International Airport while attempting to steal an aircraft after absconding from a mental health facility. He told authorities he wanted to steal a plane to "fly back to God". It is believed he acquired a key at this time which he later used to start the plane he successfully stole and crashed.

=== 1972 hijacking ===
Alice Springs Airport was the site of the resolution of Australia's second domestic aircraft hijacking. On 15 November 1972, an Ansett Fokker F27 Friendship was hijacked after taking off from Adelaide Airport. The hijacker, Miloslav Hrabinec, threatened the pilot with a rifle and demanded to be given a parachute and flown to the desert. He was persuaded to allow the plane to land at its intended destination of Alice Springs, where he engaged in a shoot-out with Northern Territory Police, critically wounding a police officer before shooting himself in the head.

=== 1977 suicide pilot ===
Four years later, another incident occurred on 5 January 1977, when a former employee of Connair, Colin Richard Forman, flew a stolen aircraft into the Connair offices (formerly Connellan Airways) located at the airport, killing himself and three of the airline's employees on the ground. A woman working in the offices suffered severe burns and died several days later.

== See also ==
- List of airports in the Northern Territory
