= First Nations Broadcasting Australia =

- Country: Australia
- Broadcast area: Darwin
- Headquarters: Unit 38 21-23 Cavenagh St; Darwin, Northern Territory

Programming
- Language: English
- Picture format: 720p 576i

First Nations Broadcasting Australia (officially known as First Nations Broadcasting Australia Ltd and formerly Aboriginal Broadcasting Australia) is an Australian television and radio network, based in Darwin. The network was founded by Indigenous Australian Donna Odegaard.

The network currently broadcasts eight different television channels, including four radio simulcasts.

== History and programming ==
First Nations Broadcasting currently airs four open narrowcast stations. They are First Nations TV (stylised as FiRST NATiONS TV), Darwin TV, First Nations Tourism TV (stylised as FiRST NATiONS TOURiSM TV) and Business TV.

Business TV replaced Education TV around 2023, while TVNT went off-air around the same time.

The broadcaster also has four radio stations—First Nations Radio, Darwin FM, First Nations Radio National and Palmerston FM88—which are all simulcast on television.

The stations air a mix of locally produced content, with some programming tailored to Indigenous Australians.

== List of television stations ==
LCN	Service
4	First Nations TV
41	Darwin TV
42	First Nations Tourism TV
43	Business TV
401	First Nations Radio
402	Darwin FM
403	First Nations Radio National
404	Palmerston FM88
Former stations
43	Education TV
44	TVNT
