= Dhay'yi =

Dhay'yi or Daii may refer to:

- Dhay'yi people
- Dhay'yi language, a variety or dialect of Dhuwal language
