= The Northern Territory Times =

Newspaper in the Northern Territory of Australia

The Northern Territory Times was a newspaper in Darwin established in 1873 and closed in 1932. The paper was called the Northern Territory Times and Gazette from 1873–1927 and then The Northern Territory Times from 1927–1932. For a while, The North Australian (1883–1889), existed as a rival publication proposing "an independent voice".

== History ==
Following the establishment of a settlement at Port Darwin in 1869, the Northern Territory Times and Gazette was set up in Adelaide and first published in 1873. The printing press was shipped to Port Darwin on the Gothenburg. The first edition was printed in a government store at the camp at the foot of Fort Hill on 7 November 1873 by George Thompson Clarkson. A week later the Northern Territory Times and Gazette moved to Mitchell Street. Richard Wells was editor until his death in the wreck of the Gothenburg in 1875. Another editor and proprietor for a few years was Joseph Skelton (c. 1822 – 25 April 1884). The Northern Territory Times and Gazette continued publication until 1927, when the title was shortened to the Northern Territory Times. An amalgamation with the Northern Standard occurred in 1932.

The Northern Territory of Australia Government Gazette (1873–present) was published in at least four different Northern Territory newspapers, which are still available online through Trove. They were:

- Northern Territory Times and Gazette (1873–1883; 1890–1927)
- The North Australian (1883–1889)
- The North Australian and Northern Territory Government Gazette (1889–1890)
- The Northern Standard (1929–1942)
- (Commonwealth Gazette (1942–1946) – included with the Federal Government's)

== See also ==
- List of newspapers in Australia
