= Dhuwal language =

Australian Aboriginal language of the Yolngu group spoken in the Northern Territory

Dhuwal
- Dhay'yi
- Native to: Australia
- Region: Northern Territory
- Ethnicity: Daii, Dhuwal, Dhuwala, Makarrwanhalmirr
- Native speakers: 4,200 (2021 census)
- Language family: Pama–Nyungan: Yolŋu languages; Southern (Dhuwal); Dhuwal
- Standard forms: Dhuwaya
- Dialects: Gupapuyngu; Gumatj; Djambarrpuyngu; Djapu; Liyagalawumirr; Guyamirlili; Dhalwangu [Dhay'yi]; Djarrwark [Dhay'yi]
- Signed forms: Yolŋu Sign Language

Official status
- Official language in: Northern Territory (as lingua franca for Aboriginal people)

Language codes
- ISO 639-3: Variously: dwu – Dhuwal djr – Djambarrpuyngu gnn – Gumatj guf – Gupapuyngu dax – Dayi (Dhay'yi) dwy – Dhuwaya
- Glottolog: dhuw1248 Dhuwal-Dhuwala dayi1244 Dayi
- AIATSIS: N198 Dhuwal, N199 Dhuwala, N118 Dhay'yi
- ELP: Dhuwala
- Liyagalawumirr
- Liyagawumirr
- Dhay'yi

Dhuwal (also Dual, Duala) is one of the Yolŋu languages spoken by Aboriginal Australians in the Northern Territory, Australia. Although all Yolŋu languages are mutually intelligible to some extent, Dhuwal represents a distinct dialect continuum of eight separate varieties.

== Dialects ==
According to linguist Robert M. W. Dixon,

- Dialects of the Yirritja moiety are (a) Gupapuyngu and Gumatj;
- Dialects of the Dhuwa moiety are (b) Djambarrpuyngu, Djapu, Liyagalawumirr, and Guyamirlili (Gwijamil).
- In addition, it would appear that the Dhay'yi (Dayi) dialects, (a) Dhalwangu and (b) Djarrwark, are part of the same language.

Ethnologue divides Dhuwal into four languages, plus Dayi and the contact variety Dhuwaya (numbers are from the 2006 census.):

- Dhuwal proper, Datiwuy, Dhuwaya, Liyagawumirr, Marrangu, and Djapu: 600 speakers
- Djampbarrpuyŋu, 2,760 speakers
- Gumatj, 240 speakers
- Gupapuyngu, 330 speakers
- Dhay'yi (Dayi) and Dhalwangu, 170 speakers

Dhuwaya is a stigmatised contact variant used by the younger generation in informal contexts, and is the form taught in schools, having replaced Gumatj ca. 1990.

== Modern usage ==
According to historian Clare Wright, the Yirrkala bark petitions, which were presented to the Australian Parliament in August 1963, were written in a standardised Yolngu script developed by the Yirrkala missionary Beulah Lowe, based on Yolngu languages. According to an article published by the Robert Menzies Institute, this language was based on Gupapuyngu.

In 2019, Djambarrpuyŋu became the first Indigenous language to be spoken in an Australian Parliament, when Yolŋu man and member of the Northern Territory Legislative Assembly Yingiya Guyula gave a speech in his native tongue.

== Phonology ==
=== Consonants ===
		Peripheral		Laminal		Apical		Glottal
		Labial	Velar	Dental	Palatal	Alveolar	Retroflex	Glottal
Plosive	Fortis	p ⟨p⟩	k ⟨k⟩	t̪ ⟨th⟩	c ⟨tj⟩	t ⟨t⟩	ʈ ⟨ṯ⟩	ʔ ⟨'⟩
Plosive	Lenis	b ⟨b⟩	g ⟨g⟩	d̪ ⟨dh⟩	ɟ ⟨dj⟩	d ⟨d⟩	ɖ ⟨ḏ⟩	ʔ ⟨'⟩
Nasal		m ⟨m⟩	ŋ ⟨ŋ⟩	n̪ ⟨nh⟩	ɲ ⟨ny⟩	n ⟨n⟩	ɳ ⟨ṉ⟩	
Tap						ɾ ⟨rr⟩		
Lateral						l ⟨l⟩	ɭ ⟨ḻ⟩	
Glide			w ⟨w⟩		j ⟨y⟩		ɻ ⟨r⟩	

=== Vowels ===
	Front	Back
High	i ⟨i⟩ iː ⟨e⟩	u ⟨u⟩ uː ⟨o⟩
Low	a ⟨a⟩ aː ⟨ä⟩	

Vowel length is contrastive in first syllable only.

== Orthography ==
Probably every Australian language with speakers remaining has had an orthography developed for it, in each case in the Latin script. Sounds not found in English are usually represented by digraphs, or more rarely by diacritics, such as underlines, or extra symbols, sometimes borrowed from the International Phonetic Alphabet. Some examples are shown in the following table.

Language	Example	Translation	Type
Pitjantjatjara dialect of the Western Desert language	paṉa	'earth, dirt, ground; land'	diacritic (underline) indicates the retroflex nasal ([ɳ])
Wajarri	nhanha	'this, this one'	digraph indicating the dental nasal ([n̪])
Yolŋu languages	yolŋu	'person, man'	⟨ŋ⟩ represents the velar nasal (borrowed from the International Phonetic Alphabet)
