= Makarrwanhalmirr =

The Makarrwanhalmirr (Mugarganalmiri) are an indigenous Australian clan-people of the Northern Territory. They are not registered as a separate tribe in Norman Tindale's classic 1974 survey.

== Language ==
The Makarrwanhalmirr are a Dhuwal clan (mala), otherwise known as Djapu, of the Dua moiety.

== People ==
According to the website of the Australian Institute of Aboriginal and Torres Strait Islander Studies, the Makarrwanhalmirr are a clan of the Yirritja moiety of the Yolngu.

== Alternative names ==
The Makarrwanhalmirr/Djapu clan are also referred to as

- Darmaramiri
- Dhamalamirr
- Maradungimi
- Maradanggimiri
- Marrathanggimir

== Sources ==
- Tindale, Norman Barnett (1974). "Duwal NT)". Aboriginal Tribes of Australia: Their Terrain, Environmental Controls, Distribution, Limits, and Proper Names. Australian National University Press. ISBN 978-0-708-10741-6. Archived from the original on 20 March 2020.
- "Yirritja moiety". AIATSIS.
