= Dhuwal =

Indigenous Australian people of Arnhem Land, Northern Territory

The Dhuwal are an indigenous Australian people of Arnhem Land in the Northern Territory.

== Language ==
Dhuwal belongs to the Yolŋu-Matha branch of the Pama-Nyungan language family.

== Country ==
The Dhuwal were described by Norman Tindale in 1974 as one of two groups of clans, the other being the Dhuwala, both living predominantly in the coastal area facing the Arafura Sea, and inhabiting the east Arnhem land coastal area reaching from Castlereagh Bay, Buckingham River, and the Koolatong River to the vicinity of Port Bradshaw. Tindale's approximate estimate of their land estates' extension, calculated together with that of the Dhuwala, was 5,400 square miles (14,000 km^{2}). In 1927 the missionary J. C. Jennison wrote down a list of some 900 words he heard from the indigenous people of Elcho Island, and modern linguistic analysis indicates that this word-list consists of vocabulary from the Dhuwal language. The implication is that Dhuwal estates also existed on that island.

== History of contact ==
The first European to come in contact with the Dhuwal, the Balamumu (seafolk/coastal people) at Caledon Bay, was Matthew Flinders. Two were shot dead in skirmishes. A short word-list was compiled of their language.

== Social organization ==
Dhuwal society is organized in terms of eight clans, all belonging to the Dua moiety of the Yirritja/Dia binome:

- Tjambarupingu (Note: Variant transcriptions: 'Tjambarpoing, Djambarrpuyngu, Djambarpingu, Djambarbwingu, Jambarboinga, Jumbapoingo, Djambarbingo, Djambarbwingo, Djambarpinga, Tchambarupi, Djambarwingu, Gujula, Gwiyula, Ngaladharr, Naladaer, Ngalado')
- Leiagawumir (Note: Variant transcriptions: 'Leyagawumirr, Liagaomir, Laigajomir, Laigojomir, Galbanuk, Galwanuk, Galwangug')
- Leiagalawumir (Leyagalawumirr, Liaalaomir, Laigalawumiri, Laigulawulmiree)
- Datiwui (Datiwuy)
- Marangu (Marrangu, Marrakuli, Merango)
- Marakulu (Marrakulu, Maragulu)
- Djapu (Note: Variant transcriptions: 'Djabu, Tjapu, Jabu, Darmaramiri, Dhamalamirr, Maradungimi, Maradanggimiri, Marrathanggimir')
- Dapuingu (Note: Variant transcriptions: 'Dhapuyngu, Wurrungguku, Wurungugu')

== Alternative names ==
- Balamumu (southern exonym for the coastal tribes around Caledon Bay, meaning 'sea/coastal folk')
- Barlamomo, Barlamumu
- Malag (from the word mala, meaning 'sea')
- Marlark
- Arrawiya
- Banjarrpuma
- Bilamandji
- Dhurili (mainly used of clans to the south)
- Durilji

== Sources ==
- "AIATSIS map of Indigenous Australia". AIATSIS.
- Flinders, Matthew (1814). Voyage to Terra Australis. Vol. 2. G. and W. Nicol.
- Jennison, J. C. (1927). "Notes on the language of the Elcho Island aborigines". Transactions of the Royal Society of South Australia. 51: 177–192.
- Morphy, Frances (1983). "Yolgnu". In Dixon, Robert M. W.; Blake, Barry J. (eds.). Handbook of Australian Languages. Vol. 3. John Benjamins Publishing. pp. 1–188. ISBN 978-9-027-22005-9.
- Tindale, Norman Barnett (1925–1926). "Natives of Groote Eylandt and the west coast of the Gulf of Carpentaria, Parts I-II". Records of the South Australian Museum. 3: 61–102, 103–134.
- Tindale, Norman Barnett (1974). "Duwal (NT)". Aboriginal Tribes of Australia: Their Terrain, Environmental Controls, Distribution, Limits, and Proper Names. Australian National University. Archived from the original on 20 March 2020.
