= List of electoral divisions in the Northern Territory =

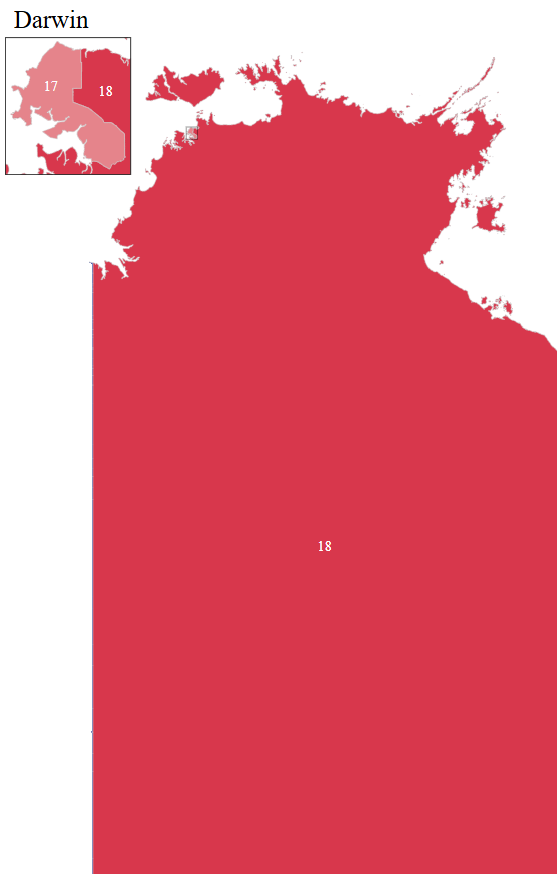
Results of the 2025 federal election

The Northern Territory, an internal territory of Australia, is divided into 2 electoral divisions for the purposes of electing the Australian House of Representatives. At the 2025 federal election the Australian Labor Party won both seats in the territory.

== Divisions ==
Name	Formed	Size (km^{2})	Classification	Current Member	Member's Party	Reference
Solomon	2000	211	Inner-metropolitan	Luke Gosling	Labor	
Lingiari (Note: Also includes Christmas Island and Cocos (Keeling) Islands)	2001	1,348,073	Rural	Marion Scrymgour	Labor	

== See also ==
- Northern Territory Legislative Assembly
