= Results of the 2025 Australian federal election in the territories =

Federal election results in territories of Australia

This is a list of electoral division results for the 2025 Australian federal election in the Australian Capital Territory and the Northern Territory.

== Australian Capital Territory ==
2025 Australian federal election (Australian Capital Territory)
- 3 May 2025

All 3 Australian Capital Territory seats in the Australian House of Representatives and all 2 seats in the Australian Senate
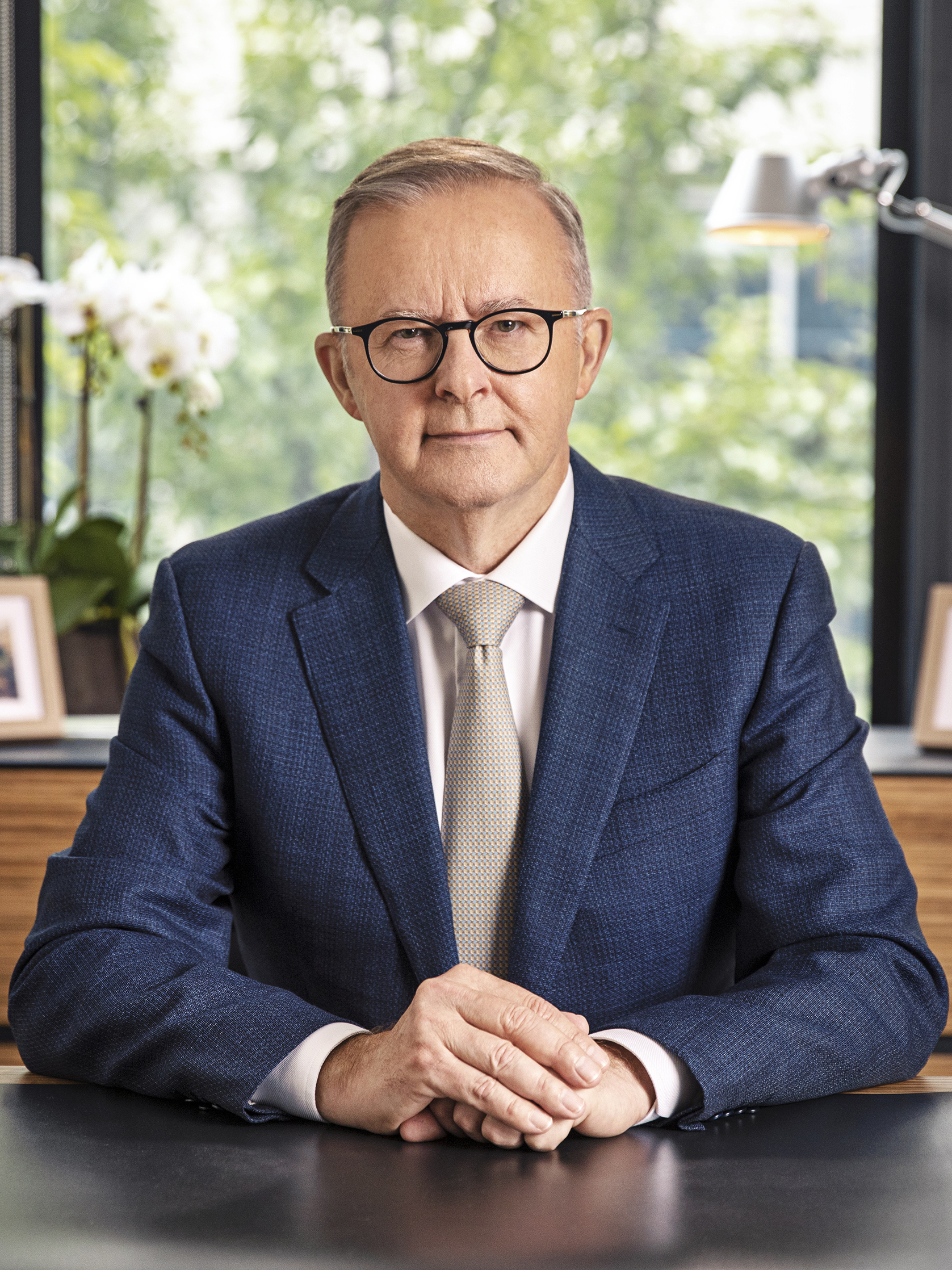

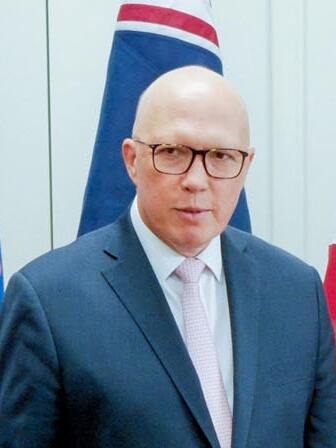
	First party	Second party
Leader	Anthony Albanese	Peter Dutton
Party	Labor	Liberal
Last election	3 seats	0 seats
Seats won	3	0
Seat change	Steady	Steady
Popular vote	138,110	61,489
Percentage	47.53%	21.16%
Swing	▲2.64	▼5.35
TPP	72.49%	27.51%
TPP swing	▲5.54	▼5.54
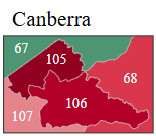

=== Overall results in the Australian Capital Territory ===
House of Representatives (IRV) – Turnout 92.41% (CV)
Party	Votes	%	Swing (pp)	Seats	Change (seats)
Labor	138,110	47.53	+2.64	3	Steady
Liberal	61,489	21.16	−5.35	0	Steady
Greens	43,753	15.06	−3.61	0	Steady
Family First	7,426	2.56	+2.56	0	Steady
Animal Justice	1,258	0.43	+0.43	0	Steady
HEART	1,222	0.42	+0.42	0	Steady
Independent	37,307	12.84	+8.30	0	Steady
Total	290,565	100.00		3	Steady
Invalid/blank votes	7,254	2.43	−0.02	–	–
Turnout	297,796	92.41	+0.35	–	–
Registered voters	322,246	–	–	–	–
Two-party-preferred vote
Labor	210,627	72.49	+5.54		
Liberal	79,938	27.51	−5.54		
Source: AEC

=== Results by division ===
==== Bean ====
2025 Australian federal election: Bean
Party	Candidate	Votes	%	±%
Labor	David Smith	42,158	41.05	−0.68
Independent	Jessie Price	27,120	26.41	+26.41
Liberal	David Lamerton	23,665	23.04	−6.68
Greens	Sam Carter	9,757	9.50	−5.30
Total formal votes		102,700	97.47	+0.35
Informal votes		2,670	2.53	−0.35
Turnout		105,370	92.53	−0.05
Notional two-party-preferred count
Labor	David Smith	71,161	69.29	+6.34
Liberal	David Lamerton	31,539	30.71	−6.34
Two-candidate-preferred result
Labor	David Smith	51,700	50.34	−12.61
Independent	Jessie Price	51,000	49.66	+49.66
Labor hold				

==== Canberra ====
2025 Australian federal election: Canberra
Party	Candidate	Votes	%	±%
Labor	Alicia Payne	45,133	48.32	+3.44
Greens	Isabel Mudford	18,504	19.81	−4.88
Liberal	Will Roche	17,101	18.31	−3.46
Independent	Claire Miles	10,187	10.91	+10.91
Animal Justice	Teresa McTaggart	1,258	1.35	+1.35
HEART	Mary-Jane Liddicoat	1,222	1.31	+1.31
Total formal votes		93,405	97.88	−0.35
Informal votes		2,021	2.12	+0.35
Turnout		95,426	92.70	+0.62
Notional two-party-preferred count
Labor	Alicia Payne	71,378	76.42	+3.96
Liberal	Will Roche	22,027	23.58	−3.96
Two-candidate-preferred result
Labor	Alicia Payne	64,936	69.52	+7.32
Greens	Isabel Mudford	28,469	30.48	−7.32
Labor hold		Swing	+7.32	

==== Fenner ====
2025 Australian federal election: Fenner
Party	Candidate	Votes	%	±%
Labor	Andrew Leigh	50,819	53.80	+5.49
Liberal	Bola Olatunbosun	20,723	21.94	−5.90
Greens	Dani Hunterford	15,492	16.40	−0.35
Family First	Elizabeth Kikkert	7,426	7.86	+7.86
Total formal votes		94,460	97.38	+0.08
Informal votes		2,540	2.62	−0.08
Turnout		97,000	92.01	+0.50
Two-party-preferred result
Labor	Andrew Leigh	68,088	72.08	+6.39
Liberal	Bola Olatunbosun	26,372	27.92	−6.39
Labor hold		Swing	+6.39	

== Northern Territory ==
2025 Australian federal election (Northern Territory)
- 3 May 2025

All 2 Northern Territory seats in the Australian House of Representatives and all 2 seats in the Australian Senate
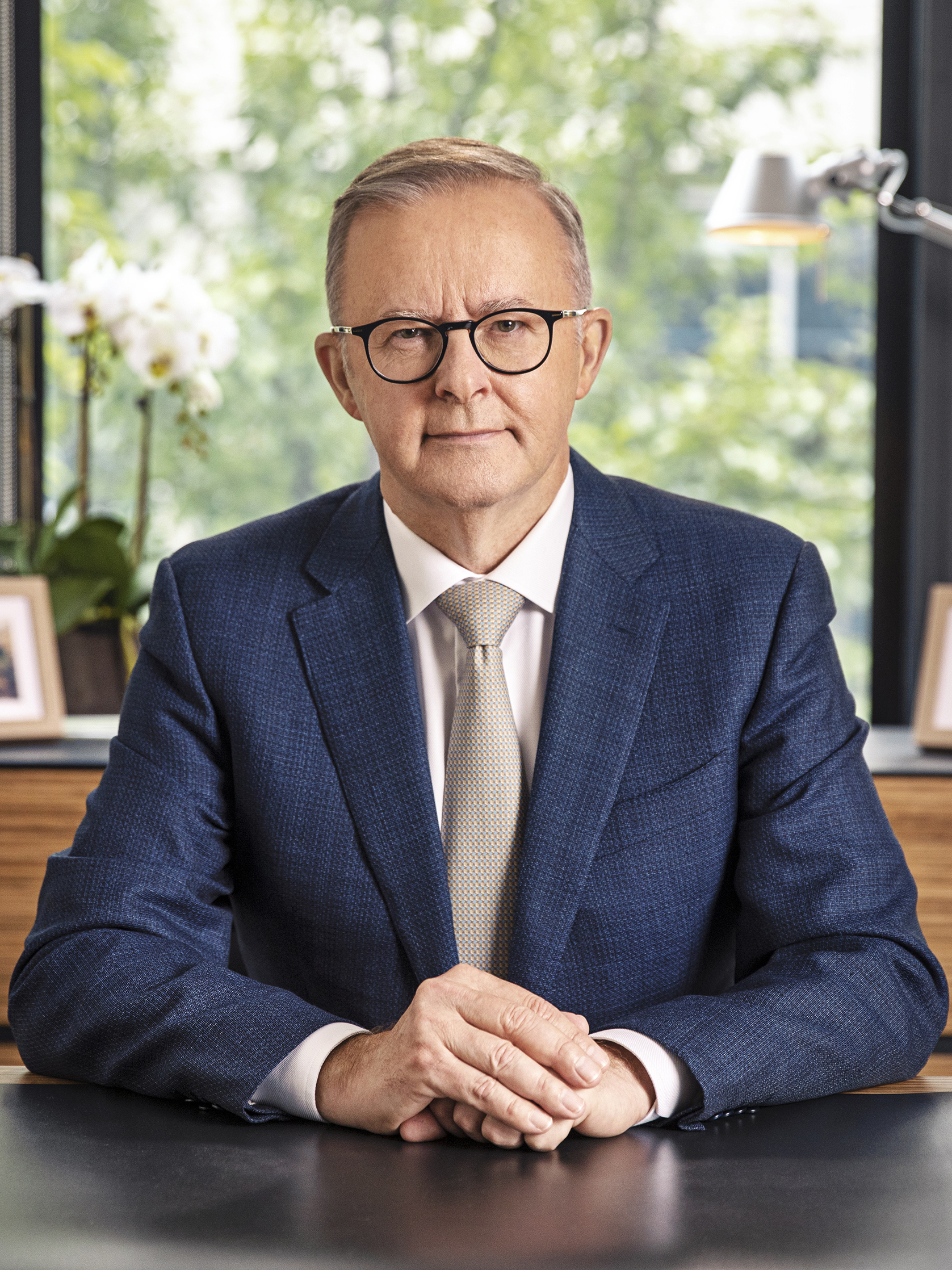

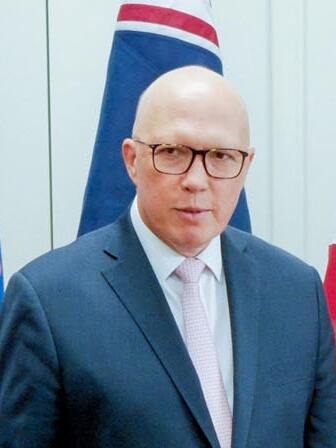
	First party	Second party
Leader	Anthony Albanese	Peter Dutton
Party	Labor	Country Liberal
Last election	2 seats	0 seats
Seats won	2	0
Seat change	Steady	Steady
Popular vote	40,123	35,785
Percentage	37.94%	33.84%
Swing	▼0.22	▲4.45
TPP	54.25%	45.75%
TPP swing	▼1.29	▲1.29
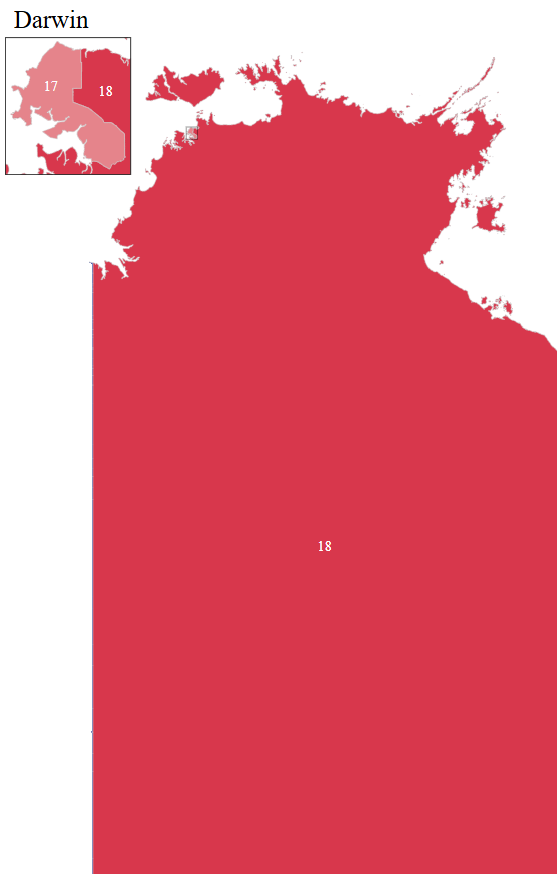

=== Overall results in the Northern Territory ===
House of Representatives (IRV) – Turnout 70.83% (CV)
Party	Votes	%	Swing (pp)	Seats	Change (seats)
Labor	40,123	37.94	−0.22	2	Steady
Country Liberal	35,785	33.84	+4.45	0	Steady
Greens	10,813	10.22	−2.84	0	Steady
One Nation	8,165	7.72	+2.35	0	Steady
Citizens	1,365	1.29	+0.80	0	Steady
Indigenous-Aboriginal	1,317	1.25	+1.25	0	Steady
Independent	8,194	7.75	+6.41	0	Steady
Total	105,762	100.00		2	Steady
Invalid/blank votes	4,397	3.99	−1.32	–	–
Turnout	110,159	70.83	−2.25	–	–
Registered voters	155,519	–	–	–	–
Two-party-preferred vote
Labor	57,377	54.25	–1.29		
Country Liberal	48,385	45.75	+1.29		
Source: AEC

=== Results by division ===
==== Lingiari ====
2025 Australian federal election: Lingiari
Party	Candidate	Votes	%	±%
Labor	Marion Scrymgour	20,372	44.64	+7.39
Country Liberal	Lisa Siebert	14,143	30.99	−3.48
Greens	Blair McFarland	4,646	10.18	−0.84
One Nation	Sakellarios Bairamis	4,132	9.06	+3.77
Indigenous-Aboriginal	Chris Tomlins	1,317	2.89	+2.89
Citizens	Peter Flynn	1,022	2.24	+1.18
Total formal votes		45,632	95.49	+2.95
Informal votes		2,157	4.51	−2.95
Turnout		47,789	62.21	+1.79
Two-candidate-preferred result
Labor	Marion Scrymgour	26,524	58.13	+6.53
Country Liberal	Lisa Siebert	19,108	41.87	−6.53
Labor hold		Swing	+6.53	

==== Solomon ====
2025 Australian federal election: Solomon
Party	Candidate	Votes	%	±%
Country Liberal	Lisa Bayliss	21,642	35.99	+10.28
Labor	Luke Gosling	19,751	32.85	−5.97
Independent	Phil Scott	7,501	12.47	+12.47
Greens	Jonathan Parry	6,167	10.26	−4.28
One Nation	Benjamin Craker	4,033	6.71	+1.28
Independent	Janey Davies	693	1.15	+1.15
Citizens	Brian Kristo	343	0.57	+0.49
Total formal votes		60,130	96.41	+0.10
Informal votes		2,240	3.59	−0.10
Turnout		62,370	79.25	+0.49
Two-candidate-preferred result
Labor	Luke Gosling	30,853	51.31	−7.09
Country Liberal	Lisa Bayliss	29,277	48.69	+7.09
Labor hold		Swing	−7.09	
