= The Northern Standard =

Former newspaper in Northern Territory Australia

The Northern Standard, also known by the uniform title Northern standard (Darwin, N.T.), was a newspaper published in Darwin, Northern Territory, Australia, from 1920 or 1921 to 1955. The paper was published by the North Australian Workers' Union from 1928 to 1955.

The Northern Territory of Australia Government Gazette (1873–present) was published in at least four different Northern Territory newspapers, which are still available online through Trove. They were:

- Northern Territory Times and Gazette (1873–1883; 1890–1927)
- The North Australian (1883–1889)
- The North Australian and Northern Territory Government Gazette (1889–1890)
- The Northern Standard (1929–1942)
- (Commonwealth Gazette (1942–1946) – included with the Federal Government's)

== Bibliography ==
- Pratt, Edna; Mayo, Beattie; Genealogical Society of the Northern Territory (2002), Index to the "Northern Standard", Genealogical Society of the Northern Territory, "except for the period 6 February 1942 to 31 May 1946 (the War Period)."
