= Northern Territory of Australia Government Gazette =

Government gazette of the Northern Territory, Australia

The Northern Territory of Australia Government Gazette (1869; 1873–present) is the current name for the government gazette of the Northern Territory.

== History ==
During the period from 1863 until 1 January 1911, the Northern Territory was annexed and then administered by the Government of South Australia, and afterwards it was transferred to Commonwealth control. In the earliest days of colonisation, the Gazette was published in at least five different NT newspapers, which are still available online through Trove. They were:

- Moonta Herald and Northern Territory Gazette (1869)
- Northern Territory Times and Gazette (1873–1883; 1890–1927)
- The North Australian (1883–1889)
- The North Australian and Northern Territory Government Gazette (1889–1890)
- The Northern Standard (1929–1942)

In the period during and immediately after World War 2 (i.e. 1942–1946), the Gazette ceased to be published locally and was instead included in the Commonwealth of Australia Gazette. Since 1978, the NT has been allowed responsible government, with a First Minister and a Legislative Assembly, within which the Gazette has evolved into its current form.

== Content ==
Gazettes are now published in the following separate series:

- Censorship (C)
- Classification of Films (CF)
- General (G)
- Mining (M)
- Public service (PS)
- Registration (R)
- Special (S)
