= Dhuwala =

Indigenous people from Arnhem Land in the Northern Territory

The Dhuwala (Duala, Du:ala) are an indigenous Australian people of eastern Arnhem Land in the Northern Territory.

== Country ==
Norman Tindale stated that the Dhuwala's lands were basically coextensive with those assigned to the Dhuwal, the two peoples inhabiting the same territory but being distinguished by linguistic differences, moiety type, and clan estate localities. More specifically, he placed them northeast of an imaginary lines linking between Castlereagh Bay and Port Bradshaw, Cape Shield, adding that they also could be found as far south as the Koolatong River.

== Social Organisation ==
Whereas the Dhuwal clan structure was exclusively of the Dua moiety type, by a complementary logic, that of the Dhuwala clans, seven in number, all belonged to the Yirritja moiety.

1. Kupapuingu. (Note: Variant transcriptions: 'Kopapingu, Gupapuyngu, Kopapoingo, Koparpingu, Kopapaingo, Gupapuynu, Gupapuyna, Kuppapoingo, Gobabwingu, Gobabwingo, Gobabuinggu, Gubabuingu, Gababingo, Gububuinung, Bababingo, Guba, Dajoror.')
2. Kujamirilili. (Guyamirrilili, Gwijamil, Gwiyamil).
3. Gumatj. (Gomaidj, Gumadji, Komaits, Gumaitj, Gomaid). (Note: Tindale was too late to register a dissentient remark regarding his treatment of the Gumatj. He wrote:'While the page proofs of this work were being read, I met a Duwal-speaking member of the area, son of a man who had his first glimpse of a Westerner when he made a visit to Groote Eylandt in 1922, ... Galarrwuy Yunupingu introduced himself as a Gomaidj tribesman and was unhappy to see that this tribal name and its boundaries had been omitted from the final draft of the Arnhem Land section of the map in favor of a mere language term, Duwal. Have I blundered?')
4. Manggalili.
5. Makarwanalmiri. (Makarrwanhalmirri, Mugarganalmiri).
6. Wobulkara. (Wulkara, Wobulgarra, Wowulkarra, Obulgara, Wolgara).
7. Madarpa. (Mararba, Madarrpa, Maderpa, Jithuwa, Jiduwa, Malarbardjuradj, Malarrbartjuray).

== Sources ==
- Tindale, Norman Barnett (1974). "Duwala (NT)". Aboriginal Tribes of Australia: Their Terrain, Environmental Controls, Distribution, Limits, and Proper Names. Australian National University. Archived from the original on 20 March 2020.
