= Dhay'yi people =

The Daii or Dhay'yi are an indigenous Australian people of the Northern Territory.

== Name ==
The tribal ethnonym Daii is formed from the demonstrative pronoun for 'this'.

== Country ==
In Norman Tindale's estimation the Daii occupied 800 square miles (2,100 km^{2}) of land, extending northwards from the shores of Blue Mud Bay as far as the Koolatong River. Their inland extension ran at least to Ngilipidji.

== Social organization ==
The Daii consisted of two clans, which formed the basis for marriage exchanges:

- Dalwangu
- Djawark

The Dalwangu moiety was jiritja, the Djawark a dua moiety.

== Trade ==
The Daii's lands accessed the rich quartzite quarry at Ngilipidji, which provided stone for prized implements that could be traded. The local industry was, according to archaeologists, probably spurred by the rise of precolonial contacts with Asia'sSouth Sulawesi Makassar voyagers.

== Alternative names ==
- Taii
- Tai
- Dalwango
- Dalwongo
- Dalwongu
- Darlwongo
- Dhalwangu
- Djawark
- Djarlwa:g

== Sources ==
- Hiscock, Peter (2007). Archaeology of Ancient Australia. Routledge. ISBN 978-1-134-30440-0.
- Tindale, Norman Barnett (1925–1926). "Natives of Groote Eylandt and the west coast of the Gulf of Carpentaria, Parts I-II". Records of the South Australian Museum. 3: 61–102, 103–134.
- Tindale, Norman Barnett (1974). "Daii (NT)". Aboriginal Tribes of Australia: Their Terrain, Environmental Controls, Distribution, Limits, and Proper Names. Australian National University Press. ISBN 978-0-708-10741-6. Archived from the original on 20 March 2020.
- Warner, W. Lloyd (April–June 1931). "Morphology and Functions of the Australian Murngin Type of Kinship (Part II)". American Anthropologist. New Series. 33 (2): 172–198. doi:10.1525/aa.1931.33.2.02a00030. JSTOR 660835.
