= Darwin FM =

Darwin FM 91.5

Darwin, Northern Territory; Australia
- Broadcast area: Darwin; Palmerston
- Frequencies: 91.5 MHz and 88 MHz

Programming
- Format: Dance music

Ownership
- Owner: Darwin FM 91.5

History
- First air date: 1995

Technical information
- Transmitter coordinates: 12°22′26.22″S 130°52′3.53″E

Links
- Website: darwinfm.org

Darwin FM is a dance music station located in Darwin, Northern Territory Australia broadcasting on the frequencies 91.5 MHz, 88 MHz, and online. The first broadcast went to air in 1995 focusing on the club culture of the world.

In 2001 a few shows were picked up by the station, and the 5 PM Mix Massive time slot was born. Soon after, in 2008, the increasing number of global dance music radio shows meant there was opportunity to form a new time slot during the day to serve the hours at work. In January 2012, KIK FM changed ownership and now exists as "Darwin FM" Xstream Radio.

== Coverage ==
Currently, coverage of Darwin FM is divided into two frequencies; 91.5 MHz which is broadcast from Casuarina, covering to Darwin City. The other is 88 MHz, which covers the Palmerston.
