= First Nations Radio =

- Darwin, Northern Territory; Australia
- Broadcast area: Darwin, Jabiru
- Frequency: 94.5 MHz FM
- Branding: Darwin's Only Aboriginal Radio Station

Programming
- Format: Programming and content specifically to promote Aboriginal culture and language.

Technical information
- Transmitter coordinates: 12°24′52.06″S 130°58′9.41″E

Links
- Website: www.firstnationsradio.org

First Nations Radio, formerly, Radio Larrakia (call sign: 8KNB), is an Aboriginal Australian community radio station in Darwin, Northern Territory with a broadcast range that reaches Jabiru.

The station was established in 1998 by the Larrakia Aboriginal community of Darwin and is managed and controlled by Larrakia Aboriginal traditional owners.

== Overview ==
First Nations Radio's aim is to promote Larrakia culture and language to Darwin and the surrounding region, combined with news, music and sport through broadcasting media. They primarily target the Larrakia Aboriginal community, as well as other local Aboriginal communities and the wider NT population.

Radio Larrakia provides training and employment opportunities in all areas of broadcasting primarily for Larrakia and also for the wider Aboriginal community of Darwin and the Northern Territory.

== Restructure ==
In 2006 the station underwent a major restructure that attracted national attention for its successful Aboriginal programs, Aboriginal community festivals, and events, and Aboriginal media and arts programs.

The Board and management ensure that First Nations Radio provides vital broadcasting and communications services to Larrakia, the non-Larrakia Aboriginal community, and the wider community within the broadcast region. As a result of the hard work and dedication of the new Board and management and the support of the members, volunteers, and Indigenous staff, Radio Larrakia is now a professionally operated and managed radio station. First Nations Radio has succeeded in becoming an important Aboriginal broadcasting service, training provider, and employer of Aboriginal people of the broadcast region.

== Current activities ==
First Nations Radio operates as a culturally appropriate Aboriginal community radio broadcaster. Aboriginal Cultural Protocols underpin all elements of the broadcaster to ensure the diversity of Aboriginal cultures, Aboriginal languages, Aboriginal communities and Aboriginal community issues are respected, acknowledged, and valued.

The Aboriginal Broadcasting Training Program was developed in 2006 and is central to delivering employment pathways.

The First Nations Radio Aboriginal Cultural Heritage Program, "ASK FIRST" is headed up by the most senior named Larrakia Aboriginal traditional owner, Raylene Singh, who ensures Aboriginal Cultural Protocols are adhered to through the "Caring for Country Program", "Aboriginal Cultural Heritage Research Program" and "Aboriginal Cultural Awareness Training Program". Raylene organizes the Kenbi Cultural Days as part of the Aboriginal Cultural Awareness Program, taking participants in the training program to Kenbi, which is the cultural landscape of the most significant Aboriginal Land Rights case in Australia's history. Kenbi is controlled by Singh and the Larrakia Traditional owners.

The First Nations Radio "Aboriginal Language Program" is a vital part of broadcasting for the recognition, protection and preservation of Aboriginal languages, including the numerous Aboriginal Kriols. Radio Larrakia is the leading broadcaster of Aboriginal languages in Australia and is developing Larrakia Aboriginal language classes in collaboration with the Larrakia traditional owners.

First Nations Radio broadcasts twenty-four hours a day locally and nationally and has dedicated Aboriginal programs that provide news and information for programming and content about Aboriginal community cultural and social issues through a focus on Aboriginal education, Aboriginal training and employment, Aboriginal community services announcements, promotion of Aboriginal music, NT Schools Training Program, Indigenous events and festivals including the Garma Festival held annually in Gulkula, Arnhem Land NT, networking with the national Indigenous broadcasting body Australian Indigenous Communications Association(AICA).

Live streaming on the internet means that First Nations Radio communicates around the world, and it is popular in Europe, Asia, and the USA. Radio Larrakia website has launched the Aboriginal broadcaster to international recognition as a community radio station and, as a result, has developed a communication network across Australia and around the world. First Nations Radio has expanded its operations to new digital technology through training and development and is delivering broadcasting services to local, rural, and remote Indigenous communities across Darwin, the Northern Territory, and the wider Australia. First Nations Radio is successfully streaming live on the internet on First Nations Radio's website providing Indigenous radio broadcasting programs twenty-four hours a day.
