= Northern Territory =

Internal territory of Australia

- Territory
- Flag Coat of arms
- Nickname(s): The Territory; The T; The NT
- Location of Northern Territory in Australia; Coordinates: 20°S 133°E
- Country: Australia
- Established by New South Wales: 1825
- Transferred to South Australia: 1863
- Transferred to Commonwealth: 1911
- Responsible government: 1 July 1978
- Capital and largest city: Darwin; 12°26′17″S 130°50′28″E
- Administration: 18 local government areas
- Common languages: English; Aboriginal languages; Australian Kriol
- Demonym(s): Territorian (Note: While the Australian Capital Territory is also an Australian internal territory and indeed more populous than the Northern Territory, it is informally referred to as the "ACT", or simply "Canberra". While the demonym for a resident of the Northern Territory is simply "Territorian", the demonym for a resident of the Australian Capital Territory is "Canberran".); Top Ender (northern half only); Centralian (Central Australian Region)
- Government: Devolved parliamentary constitutional monarchy within a federal constitutional monarchy
  - Monarch: Charles III
  - Administrator: David Connolly
  - Chief Minister: Lia Finocchiaro (CLP)
- Legislature: Northern Territory Legislative Assembly
- Judiciary: Supreme Court of the Northern Territory

Parliament of Australia
  - Senate: 2 senators (of 76)
  - House of Representatives: 2 seats (of 150)

Area
  - Land: 1,347,791 km^{2} (520,385 sq mi)
- Highest elevation (Mount Zeil): 1,531 m (5,023 ft)

Population
  - 2026-03 estimate: 268,899 (8th)
  - Density: 0.20/km^{2} (0.5/sq mi) (8th)
- GSP: 2020 estimate
  - Total: AU$26.153 billion (2016) (8th)
  - Per capita: AU$106,851 (2nd)
- HDI (2023): ▲0.944 very high · 6th (equal)
- Time zone: UTC+09:30 (ACST)
- Postal abbreviation: NT
- ISO 3166 code: AU-NT
- Symbols
- Bird: Wedge-tailed eagle (Aquila audax)
- Flower: Sturt's desert rose (Gossypium sturtianum)
- Mammal: Red kangaroo (Macropus rufus)
- Colour(s): Black, white, and ochre
- Website: nt.gov.au

The Northern Territory (abbreviated as NT; known formally as the Northern Territory of Australia and informally as the Territory) is an Australian internal territory in the central and central-northern regions of Australia. The Northern Territory shares its borders with Western Australia to the west (129th meridian east), South Australia to the south (26th parallel south), and Queensland to the east (138th meridian east). To the north, the Northern Territory looks out to the Timor Sea, the Arafura Sea, and the Gulf of Carpentaria, including Western New Guinea and various other islands of the Indonesian archipelago.

The NT covers 1,347,791 square kilometres (520,385 sq mi), making it the third-largest Australian federal division, and the 11th-largest country subdivision in the world. It is sparsely populated, with a population of only 260,400 as of March 2025 – fewer than half the population of Tasmania. The largest population centre is the capital city of Darwin, having about 52.6% of the Territory's population. The largest inland settlement is Alice Springs with a population of about 25,000 people.

The archaeological history of the Northern Territory may have begun more than 60,000 years ago when humans first settled this region of the Sahul Continent. From at least the 18th century, Makassan traders began a relationship with the indigenous people of the Northern Territory around the trading of trepang. The coast of the Territory was first seen by Europeans in the 17th century. The British were the first Europeans to attempt to settle the coastal regions. After three failed attempts to establish a settlement (1824–1828, 1838–1849, and 1864–1866), success was achieved in 1869 with the establishment of a settlement at Port Darwin.

The economy is based largely on mining and petroleum, which during 2018–2019 contributed 23% of the gross state product, or $5.68 billion, accounting for 92.4% of exports.

The Territory's population is concentrated in coastal regions and along the Stuart Highway. Besides the capital of Darwin, the major settlements are (in order of size) Palmerston, Alice Springs, Katherine, Nhulunbuy and Tennant Creek. Residents of the Northern Territory are often known as "Territorians".

== History ==
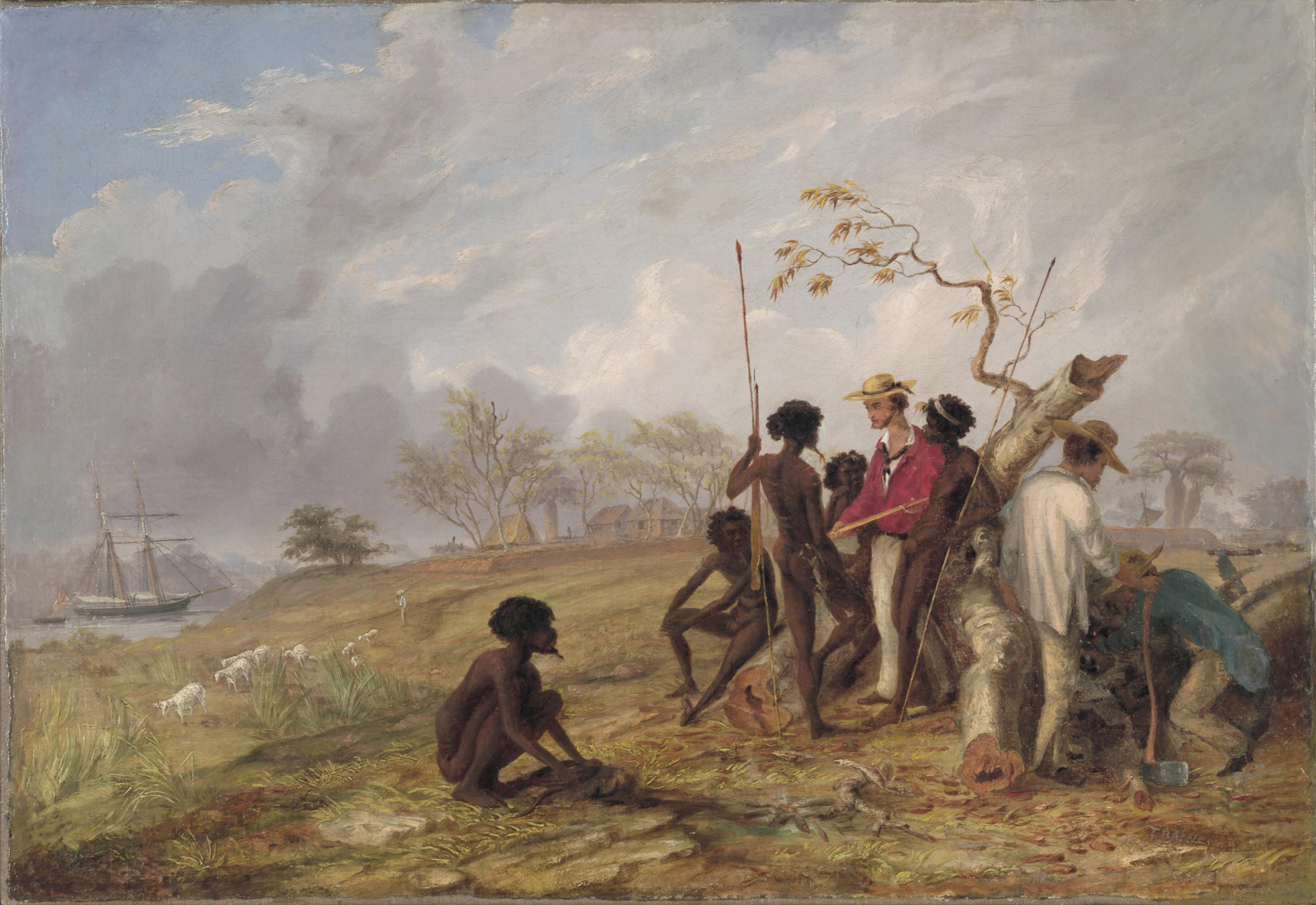
Thomas Baines with Aboriginal Australians near the mouth of the Victoria River.

=== Pre-colonial ===
Humans have lived in the present area of the Northern Territory since at least 48,400 to 68,700 years ago.

From the 17th or 18th century AD onwards, traders from Sulawesi established extensive seasonal trade links with the Indigenous peoples of Kimberley region, the modern-day Northern Territory, and Arnhem Land. They collected trepang (sea cucumber) for Chinese markets and introduced several goods and technologies to the Indigenous peoples. There is significant evidence of contact with Makassan fishers in examples of Indigenous Australian rock art and bark painting of northern Australia, with the Makassan perahu a prominent feature.

=== Colonial administration ===
With the coming of the British, there were four early attempts to settle the harsh environment of the northern coast, of which three failed in starvation and despair. The land now occupied by the Northern Territory was part of colonial New South Wales from 1825 to 1863. For a brief time from February to December 1846, it was part of the short-lived colony of North Australia. The Northern Territory was part of South Australia from 1863 to 1911. Under its administration, the Overland Telegraph Line was constructed between 1870 and 1872.

From its establishment in 1869, the Port Darwin was the major supply point for the Territory for many decades.

A railway was built between Palmerston and Pine Creek between 1883 and 1889 as part of the North Australia Railway. The economic pattern of cattle raising and mining was established so that by 1911 there were 513,000 cattle. Victoria River Downs Station, 686 kilometres (426 mi) west of Darwin, was at one time the largest cattle station in the world. Gold was found at Grove Hill in 1872 and at Pine Creek (in 1871), Brocks Creek, Burundi, and copper was found at Daly River.

=== Federal territory ===
On 1 January 1911, a decade after Federation, the Northern Territory was separated from South Australia, alongside the Australian Capital Territory from NSW, and transferred to federal control. Alfred Deakin opined at this time "[t]o me the question has been not so much commercial as national, first, second, third and last. Either we must accomplish the peopling of the northern territory or submit to its transfer to some other nation."

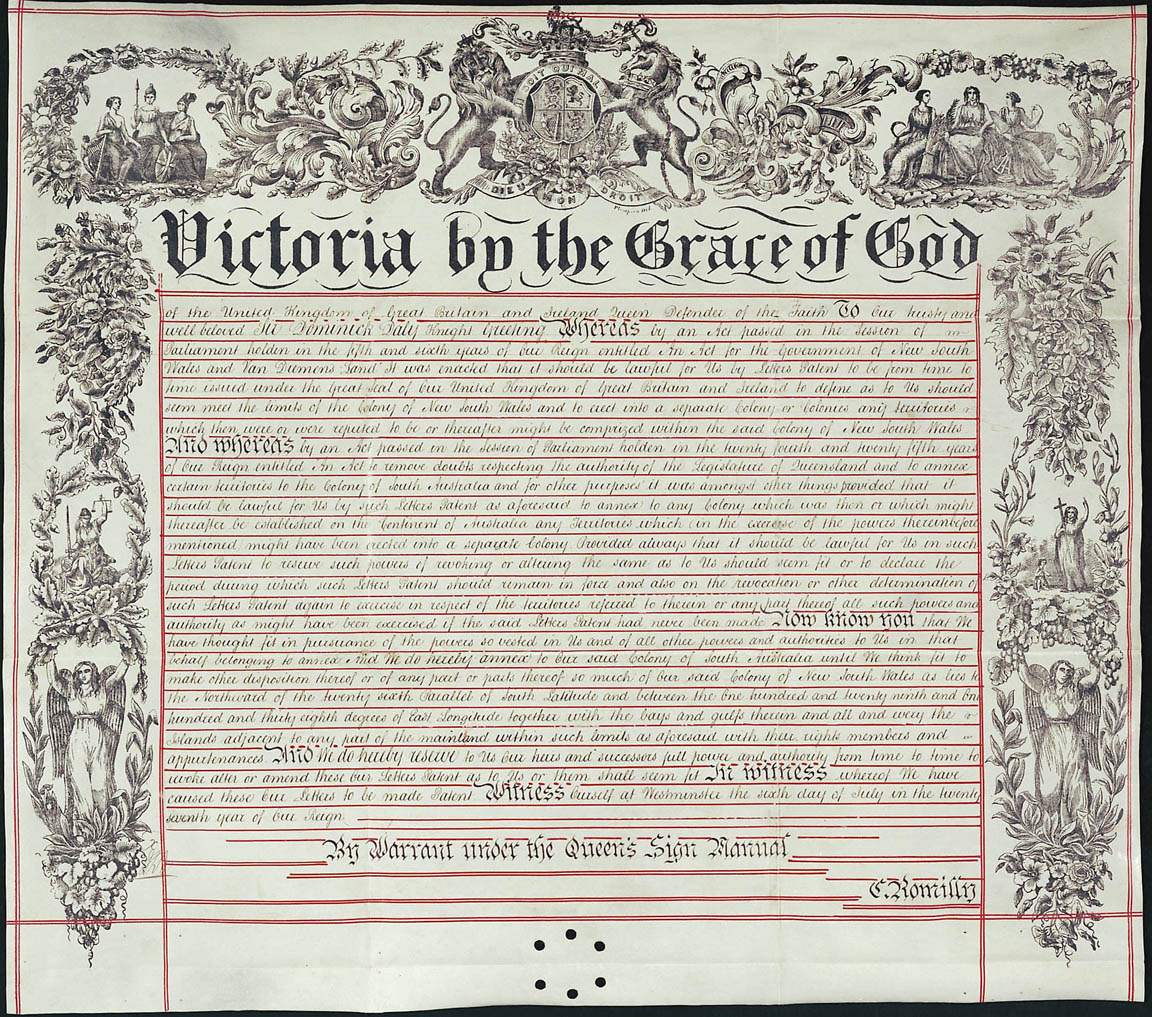
The Letters Patent annexing the Northern Territory to South Australia, 1863.

In late 1912 there was growing sentiment that the name "Northern Territory" was unsatisfactory. The names "Kingsland" (after King George V and to correspond with Queensland), "Centralia" and "Territoria" were proposed with Kingsland becoming the preferred choice in 1913. However, the name change never went ahead.

Between 1927 and 1931, the Northern Territory was divided into North Australia and Central Australia at the 20th parallel south. Soon after this time, parts of the Northern Territory were considered in the Kimberley Plan as a possible site for the establishment of a Jewish Homeland, understandably considered the "Unpromised Land".

In the early 20th century, the southern part of the Territory was considered the "last frontier" of Australian settlement, where 'sympathetic whites' hoped that Aboriginal traditions would continue to be practised. Conflicts arose due to the resource scarcity and the fragility of the cattle industry and the area was rife with Indigenous 'bush bandits' who speared cattle for food for want of employment by ranchers. This was exacerbated by a drought between 1925 and 1929 that led to the deaths of 85 per cent of the children at the Hermannsburg Mission in Central Australia. In the meantime, white attitudes towards Aboriginal people were paternalistic, torn between the desire to help them in times of hunger and the fear of "pauperizing" them and reducing their incentives to work.

In the 1928 Coniston massacre, punitive expeditions were carried out by white colonists led by Northern Territory Police constable William George Murray in response to the murder of a dingo hunter, resulting in the deaths of dozens to hundreds of people of the Warlpiri, Anmatyerre, and Kaytetye groups. This was one of many massacres of Aboriginal people in the region.

==== World War II ====
During World War II, most of the Top End was placed under military government. This is the only time since Federation that part of an Australian state or territory has been under military control. After the war, control for the entire area was handed back to the Commonwealth. The Bombing of Darwin occurred on 19 February 1942. It was the largest single attack ever mounted by a foreign power on Australia. Evidence of Darwin's World War II history is found at a variety of preserved sites in and around the city, including ammunition bunkers, airstrips, oil tunnels and museums. The port was damaged in the 1942 Japanese air raids. It was subsequently restored.

==== Post-World War II ====
In the late 1960s improved roads in adjoining States linking with the territory, port delays and rapid economic development led to uncertainty in port and regional infrastructure development. As a result of the Commission of Enquiry established by the Administrator, port working arrangements were changed, berth investment deferred and a port masterplan prepared. Extension of rail transport was then not considered because of low freight volumes.

Aboriginal Australians in the territory struggled for rights to land and fair wages. In 1963, the Yolngu people of Arnhem Land submitted two petitions, known as the Yirrkala bark petitions, to the Australian Parliament to protest their land being taken for mining bauxite without prior consultation. Another important event in this struggle was the strike and walk off by the Gurindji people at Wave Hill Cattle Station in 1966. The Northern Territory Council for Aboriginal Rights (NTCAR) supported the strikers and provided publicity.

In February 1973, the Federal government of Gough Whitlam set up the Woodward Royal Commission, to enquire into how land rights might be achieved in the Northern Territory. Justice Woodward's first report in July 1973 recommended that a Central Land Council and a Northern Land Council be established to present to him the views of Aboriginal people. A Land Rights Bill was drafted, and the Aboriginal Land Rights (Northern Territory) Act 1976 was passed by the Fraser government in December 1976 and began operation in January 1977. The Northern Territory Council for Aboriginal Rights was disestablished in 1976.

In 1974, from Christmas Eve to Christmas Day, Darwin was devastated by tropical Cyclone Tracy. Cyclone Tracy killed 66 people, caused A$837 million in damage, approximately A$8.38 billion as of 2024, and destroyed more than 70 per cent of Darwin's buildings, including 80 per cent of houses. Tracy left more than 41,000 out of the 47,000 inhabitants of the city homeless. The city was rebuilt with much-improved construction codes and is a modern, landscaped metropolis today.

=== Self-government ===
In 1978, the Territory was granted self-government by the Northern Territory (Self-Government) Act 1978, with a Legislative Assembly headed by a Chief Minister. The Administrator of the Northern Territory is another important position in the government. They act as the King's representative in the Territory and a part of their role is appointing the Chief Minister. The Territory publishes official notices in its own Government Gazette. In the 1980s, conservation-oriented areas in the Northern Territory such as Kakadu National Park and Uluru-Kata Tjuta National Park were inscribed on the UNESCO World Heritage List for their mix of natural heritage and Aboriginal culture.

In 1995–96, the Northern Territory was briefly one of the few places in the world with legal voluntary euthanasia, until the Federal Parliament overturned the legislation. Before the over-riding legislation was enacted, four people used the law supported by Dr Philip Nitschke.

== Geography ==
Northern Territory towns, settlements and road network.

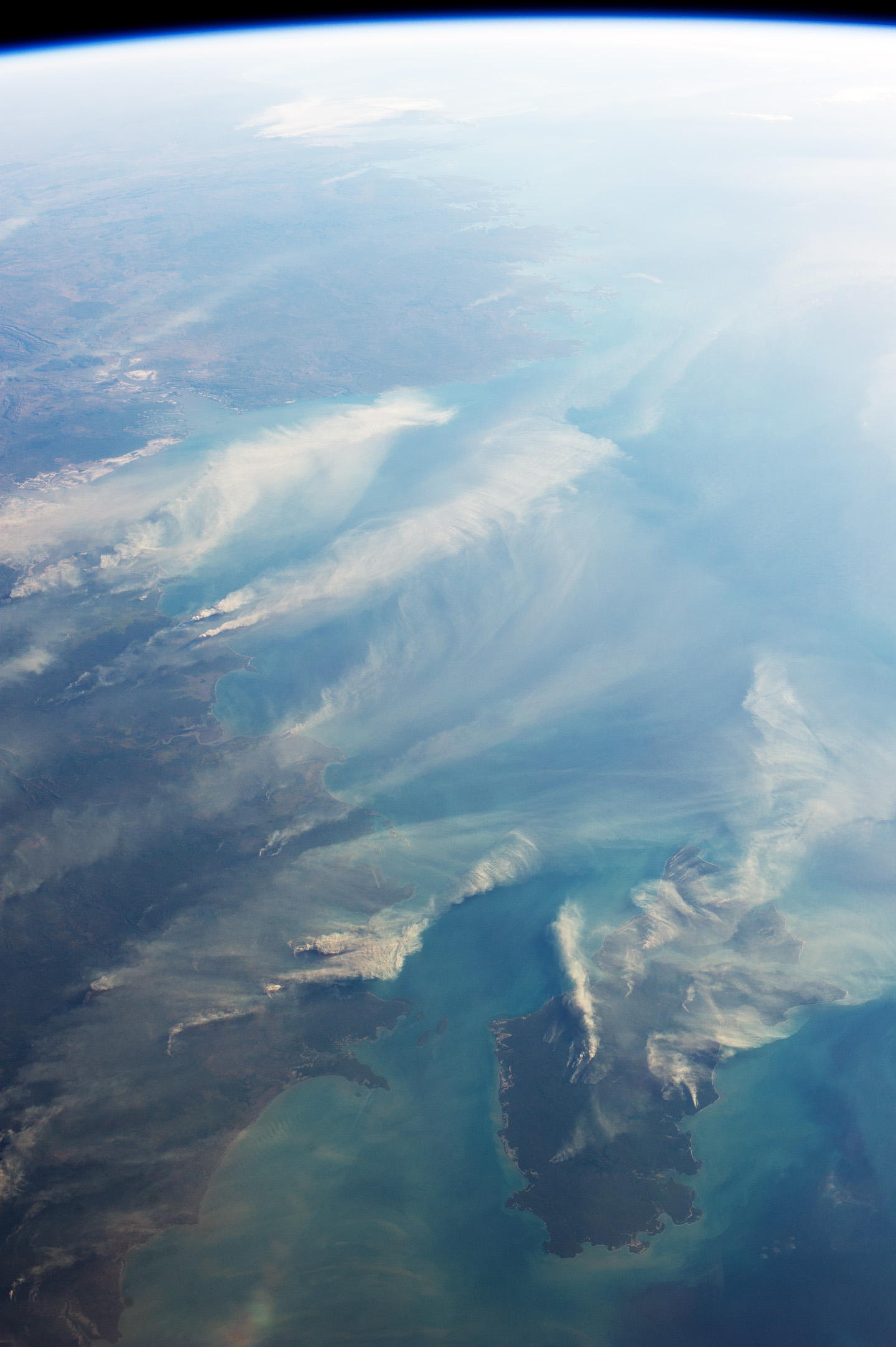
The northern coast of Australia is on the left, with Melville Island in the lower right.

There are many very small settlements scattered across the Territory. The larger population centres are located on the single paved road that links Darwin to southern Australia, the Stuart Highway, known to locals simply as "the track".

The Territory is home to many spectacular natural rock formations, including Uluru / Ayers Rock and Kata Tjuta / The Olgas in the Central Australian region and Kakadu National Park in the north. Each of these sites are sacred to the local Aboriginal people and which have become major International tourist attractions and recognised UNESCO World Heritage sites.

The northern portion of the Territory is principally tropical savannas, composed of several distinct ecoregions – Arnhem Land tropical savanna, Carpentaria tropical savanna, Kimberley tropical savanna, Victoria Plains tropical savanna, and Mitchell Grass Downs. The southern portion of the Territory is covered in deserts and xeric shrublands, including the Great Sandy-Tanami desert, Simpson Desert, and Central Ranges xeric scrub.

There are extensive river systems in the Territory. These rivers include: the Alligator Rivers, Daly River, Finke River, McArthur River, Roper River, Todd River and Victoria River. The Hay River is a river south-west of Alice Springs, with the Marshall River, Arthur Creek, Camel Creek and Bore Creek flowing into it.

=== National parks ===
- Barranyi (North Island) National Park
- Casuarina Coastal Reserve
- Daly River Nature Park
- Djukbinj National Park
- Dulcie Range National Park
- Elsey National Park
- Finke Gorge National Park
- Garig Gunak Barlu National Park
- Howard Springs Nature Park
- Iytwelepenty / Davenport Ranges National Park
- Judbarra / Gregory National Park
- Kakadu National Park
- Karlu Karlu / Devils Marbles Conservation Reserve
- Keep River National Park
- Litchfield National Park
- Mary River National Park
- Nitmiluk National Park
- Tjoritja / West MacDonnell National Park
- Uluṟu-Kata Tjuṯa National Park
- Watarrka National Park
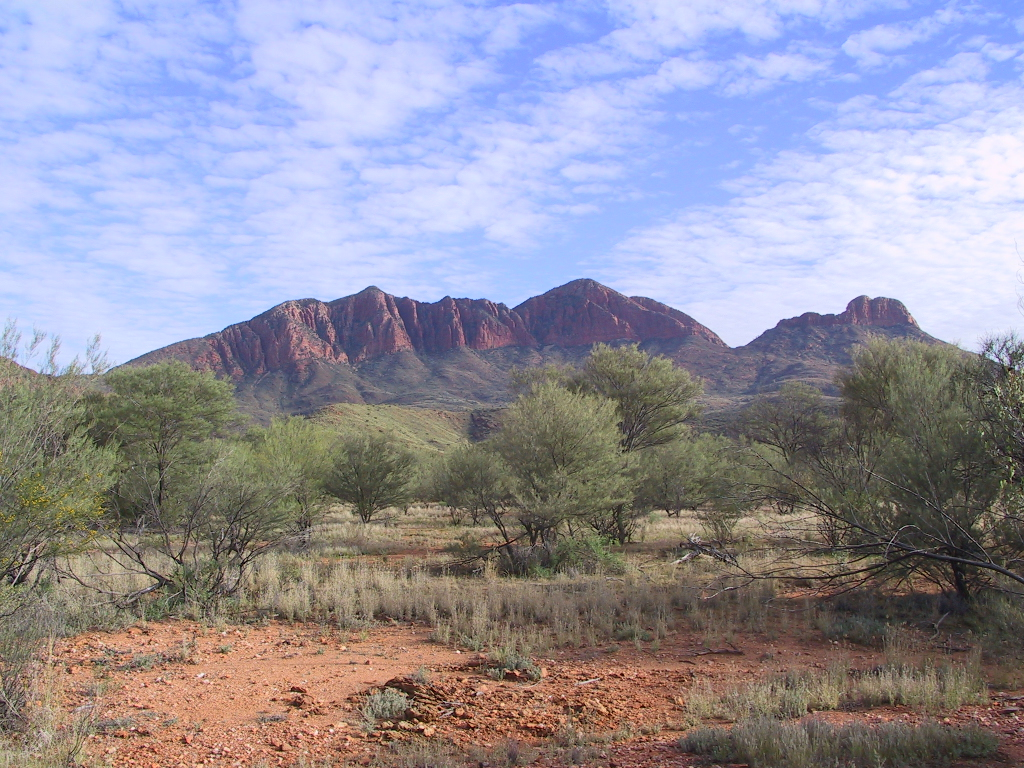
Mount Sonder, the fourth-highest mountain in the Northern Territory after nearby Mount Zeil, in West MacDonnell National Park

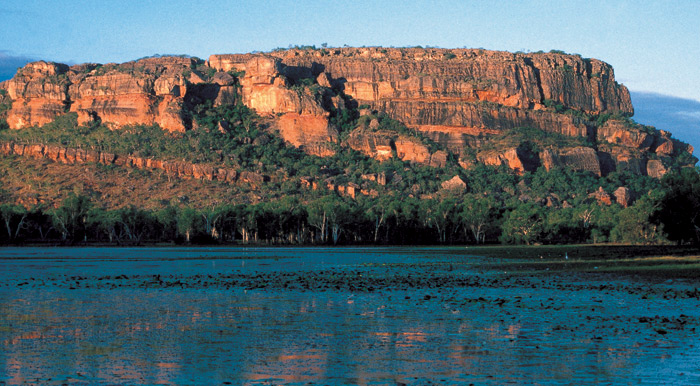
Nourlangie Rock in Kakadu National Park

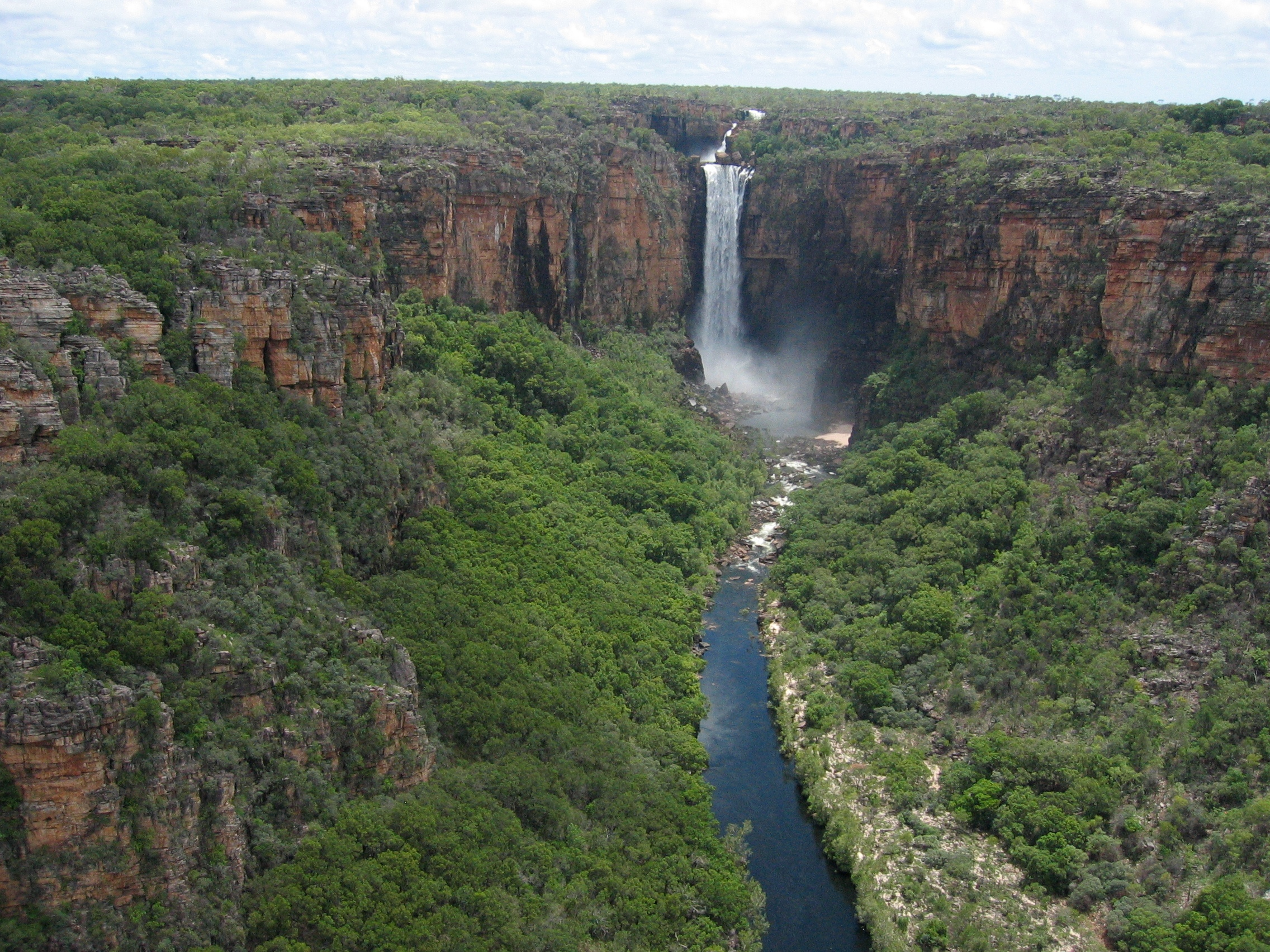
Jim Jim Falls, Kakadu National Park

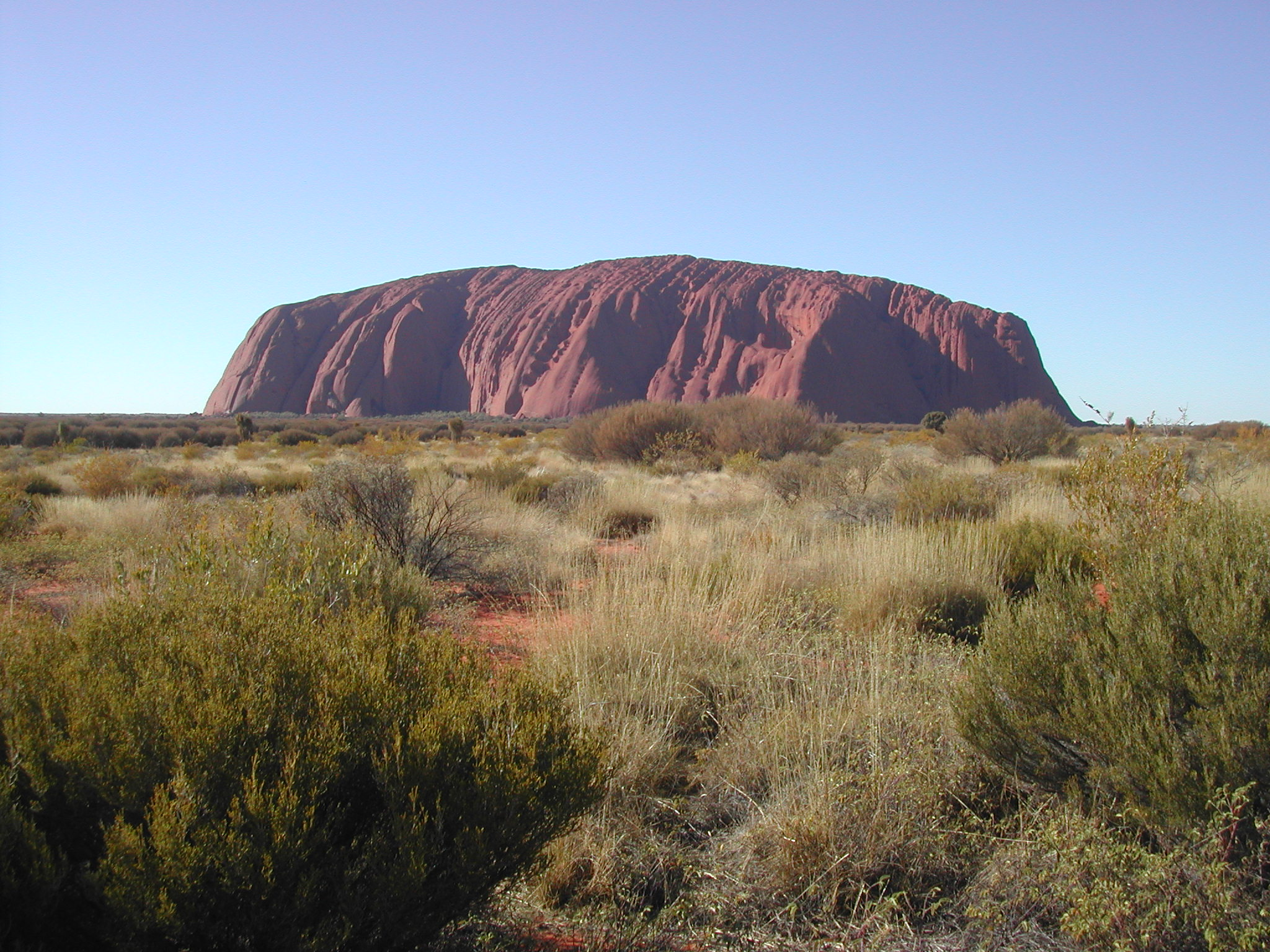
Uluru / Ayers Rock, one of the best-known images of the Northern Territory

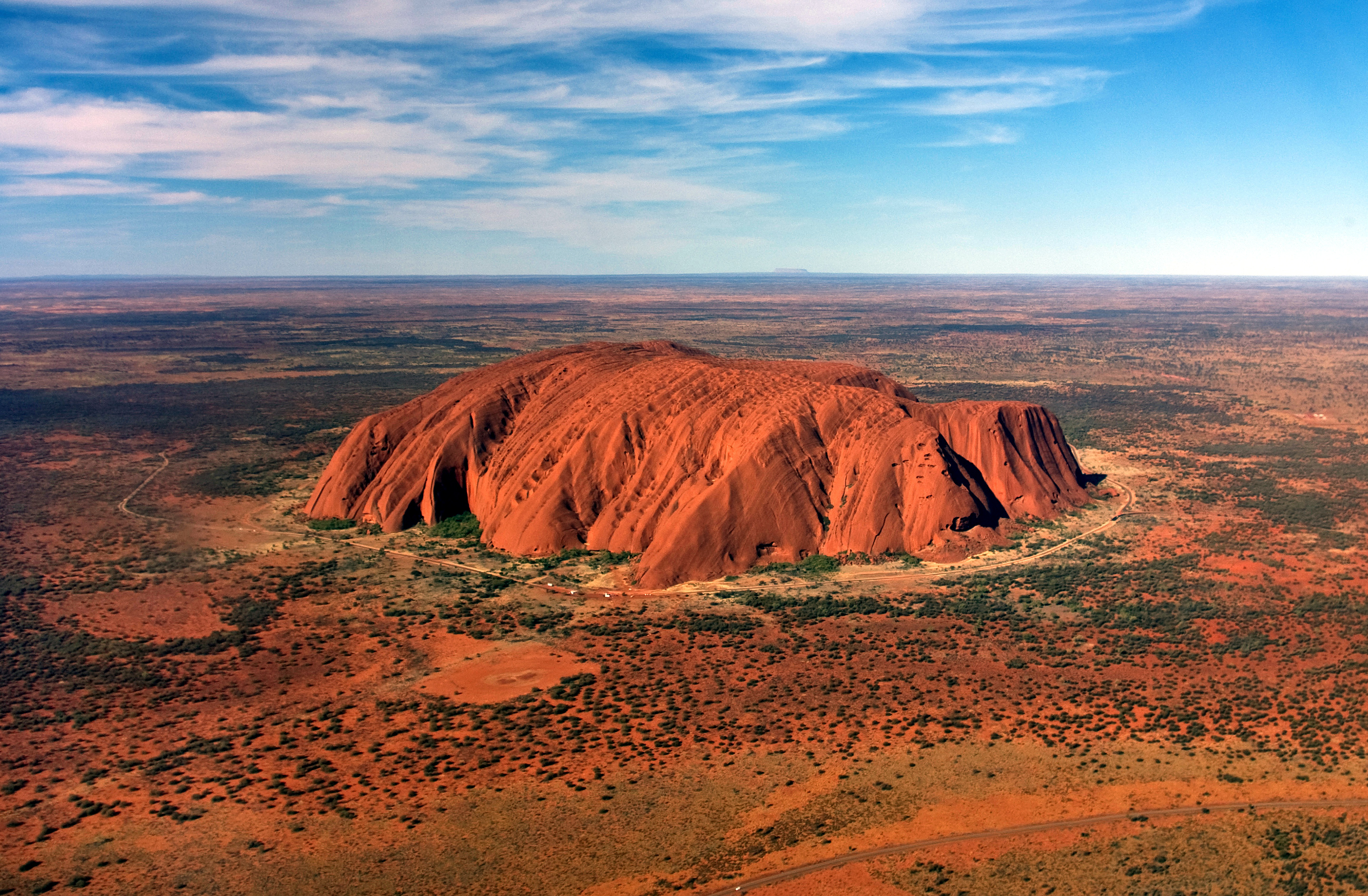
Aerial view of Uluru / Ayers Rock

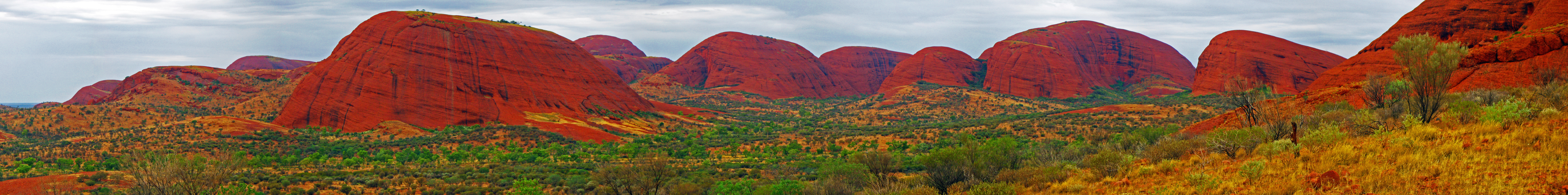
Uluṟu-Kata Tjuṯa National Park

=== Climate ===
Köppen climate types in the Northern Territory.

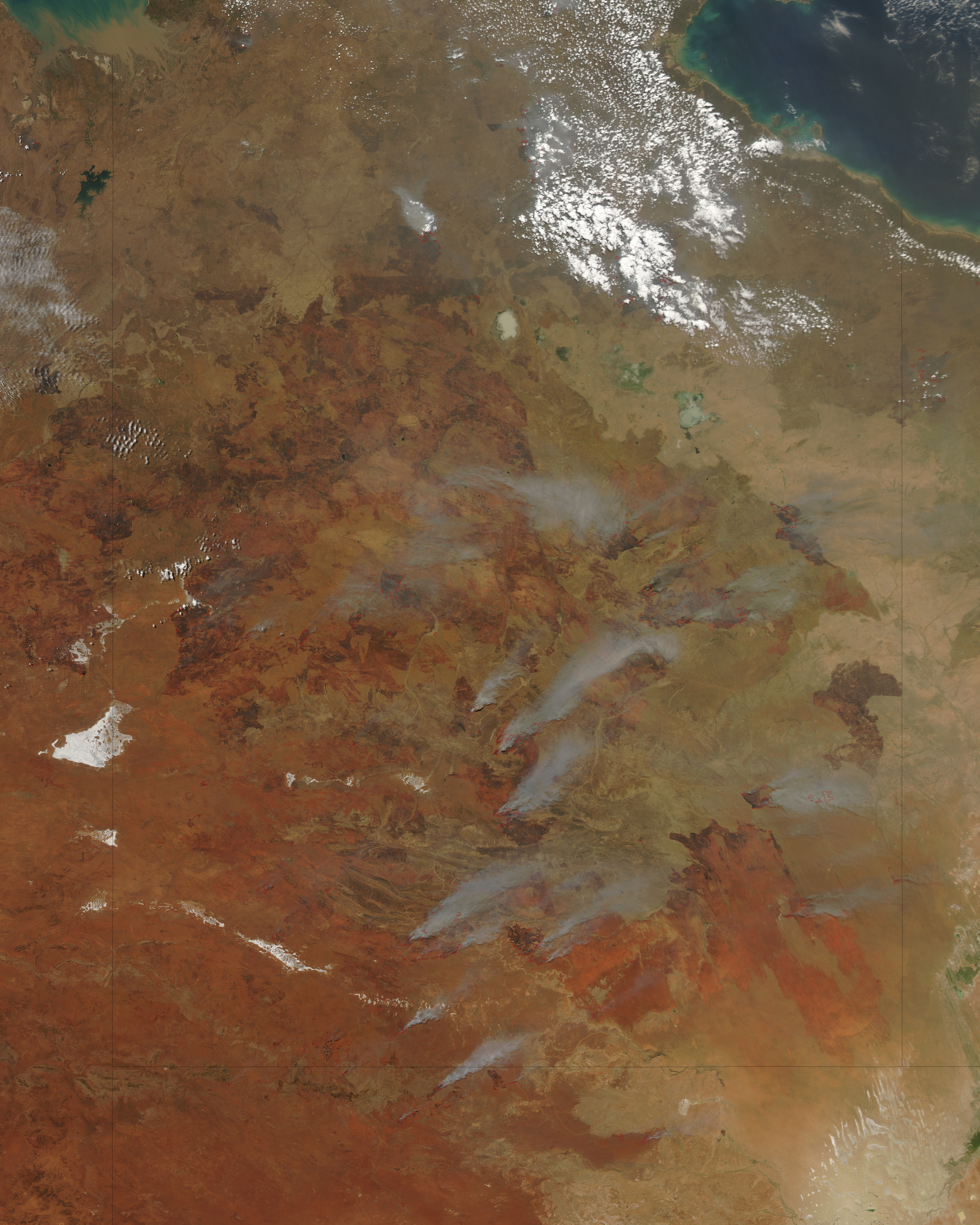
Satellite image of fire activity in central Australia.

Average monthly maximum temperature in Northern Territory
Month	Darwin	Alice Springs
January	31.8 °C	36.3 °C
February	31.4 °C	35.1 °C
March	31.9 °C	32.7 °C
April	32.7 °C	28.2 °C
May	32.0 °C	23.0 °C
June	30.6 °C	19.8 °C
July	30.5 °C	19.7 °C
August	31.3 °C	22.6 °C
September	32.5 °C	27.1 °C
October	33.2 °C	30.9 °C
November	33.2 °C	33.7 °C
December	32.6 °C	35.4 °C
Source: Bureau of Meteorology

The Northern Territory has two distinctive climate zones.

The northern end, including Darwin, has a tropical climate with high humidity and two seasons, the wet (October to April) and dry season (May to September). During the dry season nearly every day is warm and sunny, and afternoon humidity averages around 30%. There is very little rainfall between May and September. In the coolest months of June and July, the daily minimum temperature may dip as low as 14 °C (57 °F), but very rarely lower, and frost has never been recorded.

The wet season is associated with tropical cyclones and monsoon rains. The majority of rainfall occurs between December and March (the southern hemisphere summer), when thunderstorms are common and afternoon relative humidity averages over 70% during the wettest months. On average more than 1,570 mm (62 in) of rain falls in the north. Rainfall is highest in north-west coastal areas, where rainfall averages from 1,800 to 2,100 mm (71 to 83 in).

The central region is the desert centre of the country, which includes Alice Springs and Uluru (Ayers Rock), and is semi-arid with little rain usually falling during the hottest months from October to March. Seasons are more distinct in central Australia, with very hot summers and cool winters. Frost is recorded a few times a year. The region receives less than 250 mm (9.8 in) of rain per year.

The highest temperature recorded in the territory was 48.3 °C (118.9 °F) at Finke on 1 and 2 January 1960. The lowest temperature was −7.5 °C (18.5 °F) at Alice Springs on 17 July 1976.

Climate data for Northern Territory
Month	Jan	Feb	Mar	Apr	May	Jun	Jul	Aug	Sep	Oct	Nov	Dec	Year
Record high °C (°F)	48.3 (118.9)	46.4 (115.5)	45.0 (113.0)	41.5 (106.7)	40.2 (104.4)	37.9 (100.2)	37.5 (99.5)	39.7 (103.5)	42.0 (107.6)	45.0 (113.0)	46.1 (115.0)	47.2 (117.0)	48.3 (118.9)
Record low °C (°F)	6.7 (44.1)	8.5 (47.3)	4.7 (40.5)	1.0 (33.8)	−4.2 (24.4)	−6.0 (21.2)	−7.5 (18.5)	−5.4 (22.3)	−2.8 (27.0)	0.0 (32.0)	3.5 (38.3)	7.5 (45.5)	−7.5 (18.5)
Source: Bureau of Meteorology

== Governance ==
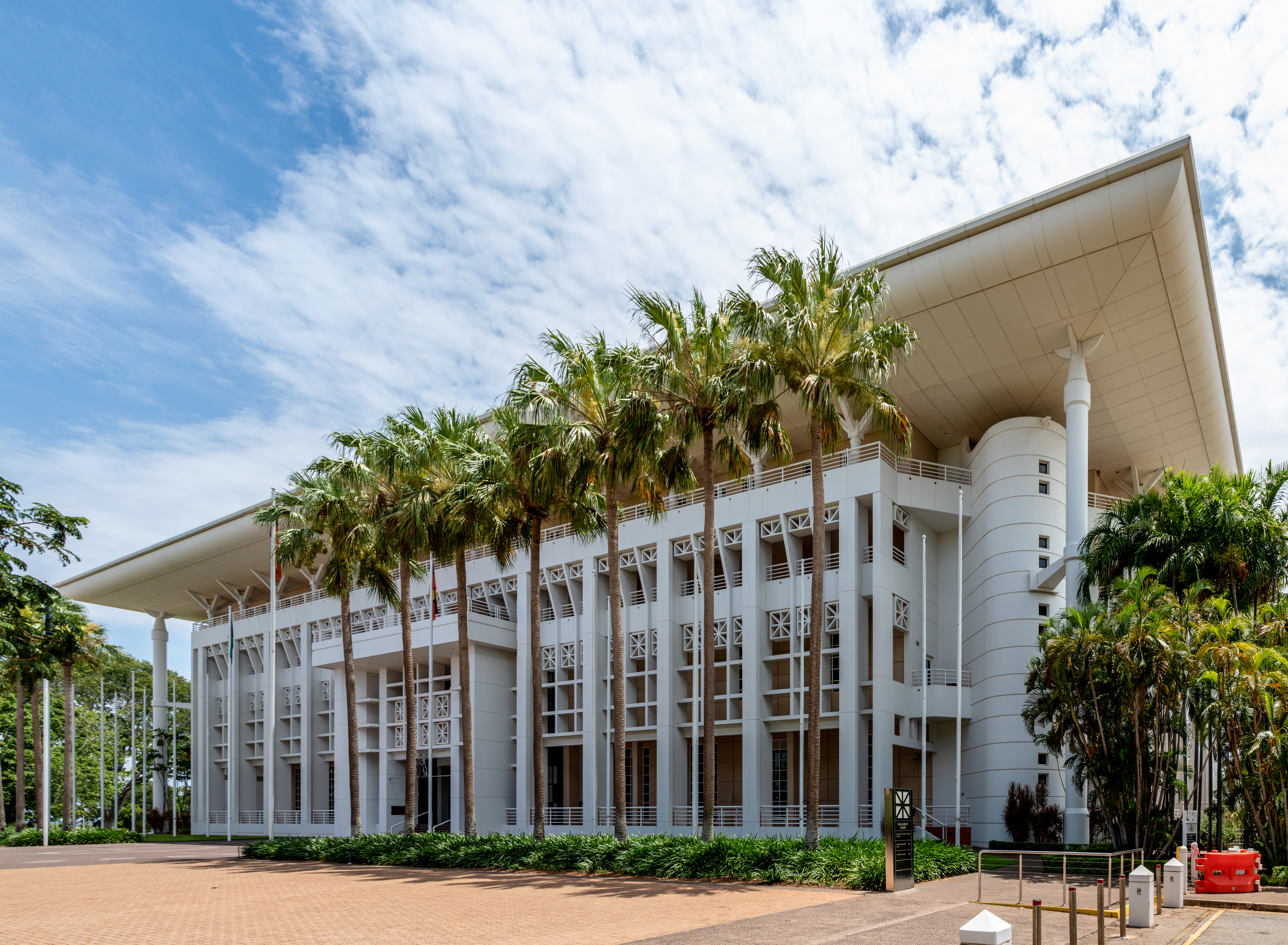
The Parliament House building in Darwin

=== Parliament ===
The Northern Territory Parliament is one of the three unicameral parliaments in the country. Based on the Westminster System, it consists of the Northern Territory Legislative Assembly which was created in 1974, replacing the Northern Territory Legislative Council. It also produces the Northern Territory of Australia Government Gazette.

The Northern Territory Legislative Council was the partly elected governing body from 1947 until its replacement by the fully elected Northern Territory Legislative Assembly in 1974. The total enrolment for the 1947 election was 4,443. The Northern Territory was split into five electorates: Darwin, Alice Springs, Tennant Creek, Batchelor, and Stuart.While this assembly exercises powers similar to those of the parliaments of the states of Australia, it does so by legislated devolution of powers from the Commonwealth Government, rather than by any constitutional right. As such, the Commonwealth Government retains the right to legislate for the territory, including the power to override legislation passed by the Legislative Assembly. The Monarch is represented by the Administrator of the Northern Territory, who performs a role similar to that of a state governor.

Twenty-five members of the Legislative Assembly are elected to four-year terms from single-member electorates.

Numerous times since self government was granted there has been agitation for full statehood within the region. A referendum of voters in the Northern Territory was held on the issue in 1998, which resulted in a 'no' vote. This was a shock to both the Northern Territory and Commonwealth governments, as opinion polls showed most Territorians supported statehood. But under the Australian Constitution, the federal government may set the terms of entry to full statehood. The Northern Territory was offered three senators, rather than the twelve guaranteed to original states (because of the difference in populations, equal numbers of Senate seats would mean a Territorian's vote for a senator would have been worth more than 30 such votes in New South Wales or Victoria). Alongside what was cited as an arrogant approach adopted by then chief minister Shane Stone, it is believed that most Territorians, regardless of their general views on statehood, were reluctant to adopt the particular offer that was made.

=== Chief minister and cabinet ===
The chief minister is the head of government of a self-governing territory (the head of a state government is a premier). The chief minister is appointed by the administrator, who in normal circumstances appoints the leader of whichever party holds the majority of seats in the Northern Territory Legislative Assembly. The current chief minister is Lia Finocchiaro of the Country Liberal Party. The CLP defeated Territory Labor to win office on 24 August 2024.

=== Administrator ===
The Northern Territory became self-governing on 1 July 1978 under its own administrator appointed by the Governor-General of Australia. The federal government, not the NT government, advises the governor-general on the appointment of the administrator, but by convention consults first with the Territory government. The current administrator is David Connolly who commenced his term on 27 February 2026.

=== Federal government ===
Children wave Australian flags during an Anzac Day parade in Palmerston.

The Northern Territory is represented in the federal parliament by two members in the House of Representatives and two members in the Senate. As of May 2022, resulting from the 2022 federal election, Marion Scrymgour from the Australian Labor Party (ALP) in Lingiari and Luke Gosling from the Australian Labor Party (ALP) in Solomon serve in the House of Representatives, and Malarndirri McCarthy from the ALP and Jacinta Nampijinpa Price from the Country Liberal Party serve in the Senate.

=== Local government ===
The Northern Territory is divided into seventeen local government areas: two cities, three municipalities, nine regions, and three shires. Shire, city and town councils are responsible for functions delegated by the Northern Territory parliament, such as road infrastructure and waste management. Council revenue comes mostly from property taxes and government grants.

=== Aboriginal land councils ===
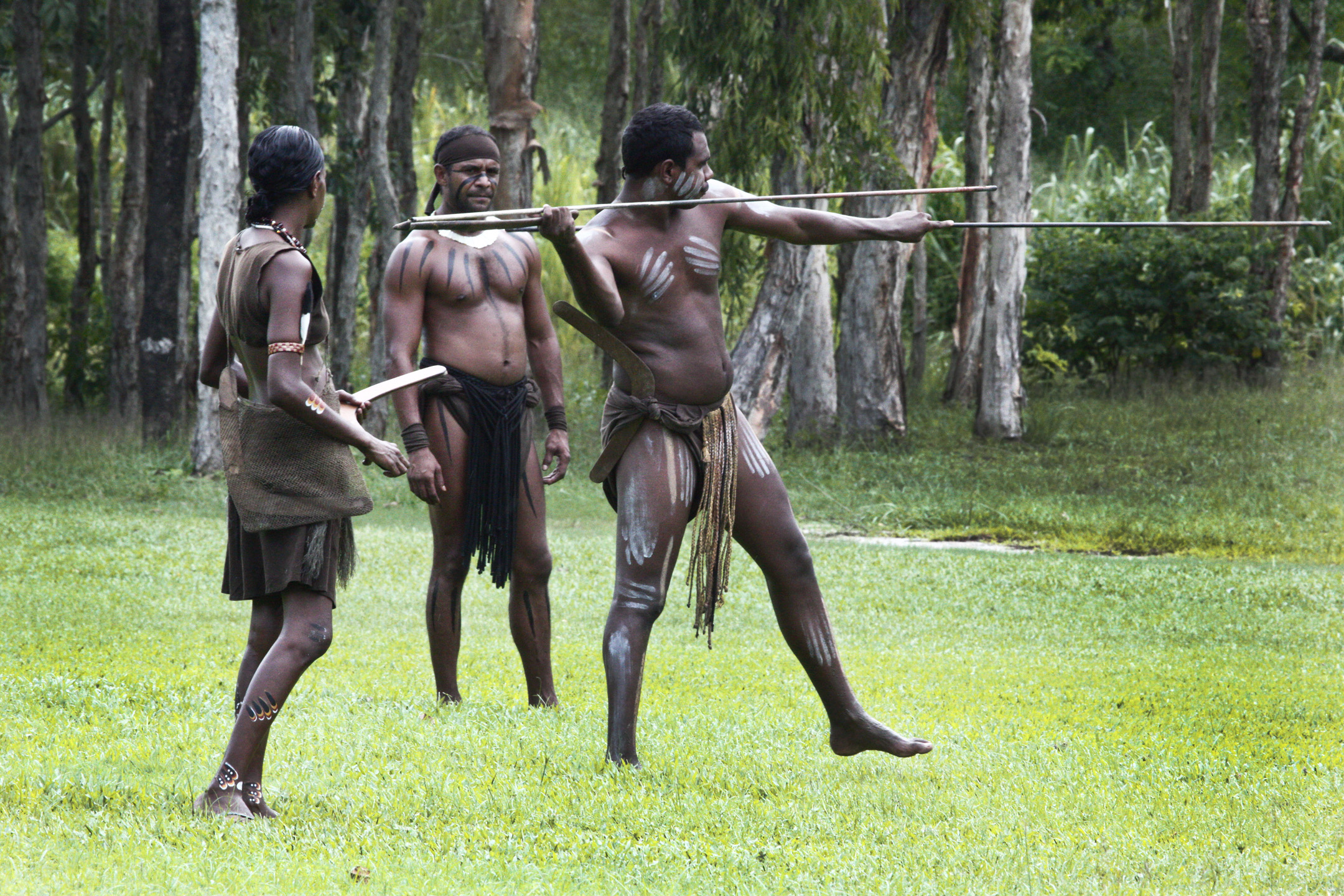
Aboriginal Australians own about 49% of the Northern Territory's land.

Aboriginal land councils in the Northern Territory are groups of Aboriginal landowners, set up under the Aboriginal Land Rights Act 1976.

=== Political parties ===
The two historically dominant political parties in the Northern Territory are the conservative Country Liberal Party which governed the Territory from 1974 to 2001, from 2012 to 2016 and since 2024, and the social-democratic Australian Labor Party which governed the Territory from 2001 to 2012 and from 2016 to 2024. Minor parties that are also active in the NT include the Northern Territory Greens, the Shooters and Fishers Party and various others. It is common for independent politicians to win elections.

The CLP's rule was once so tight, that a former minister once said the CLP had a "'rightful inheritance of being the party that runs this place'".

The 2024 Northern Territory general election saw the NT Greens win a seat in the Legislative Assembly, with Kat McNamara defeating former Chief Minister Natasha Fyles in the seat of Nightcliff; this marked the first time the Greens entered the Legislative Assembly in the history of the Northern Territory.

As fewer parties and candidates contest Northern Territory general elections than they do Australian federal elections in the Northern Territory, the CLP, Labor and independents usually have a higher vote share at territory elections than at federal elections in the Northern Territory due to the absence of right-wing minor parties such as Pauline Hanson's One Nation and the fact that the Greens do not run in every seat at territory elections.

== Demographics ==
Estimated resident population since 1981

Population estimates for the Northern Territory
Year	Population
1901	4,765
1956	19,556
1961	44,481
1974	102,924
1976	97,090
1981	122,616
1991	165,493
1996	181,843
2001	200,019
2006	192,900
2011	211,945
2016	228,833
2021	232,605
Source: Australian Bureau of Statistics (Est Resident Pop)

The population of the Northern Territory at the 2011 Australian census was 211,945, a 10 per cent increase from the 2006 census. The Australian Bureau of Statistics estimated a June 2015 resident population of 244,300, taking into account residents overseas or interstate. The territory's population represents 1% of the total population of Australia.

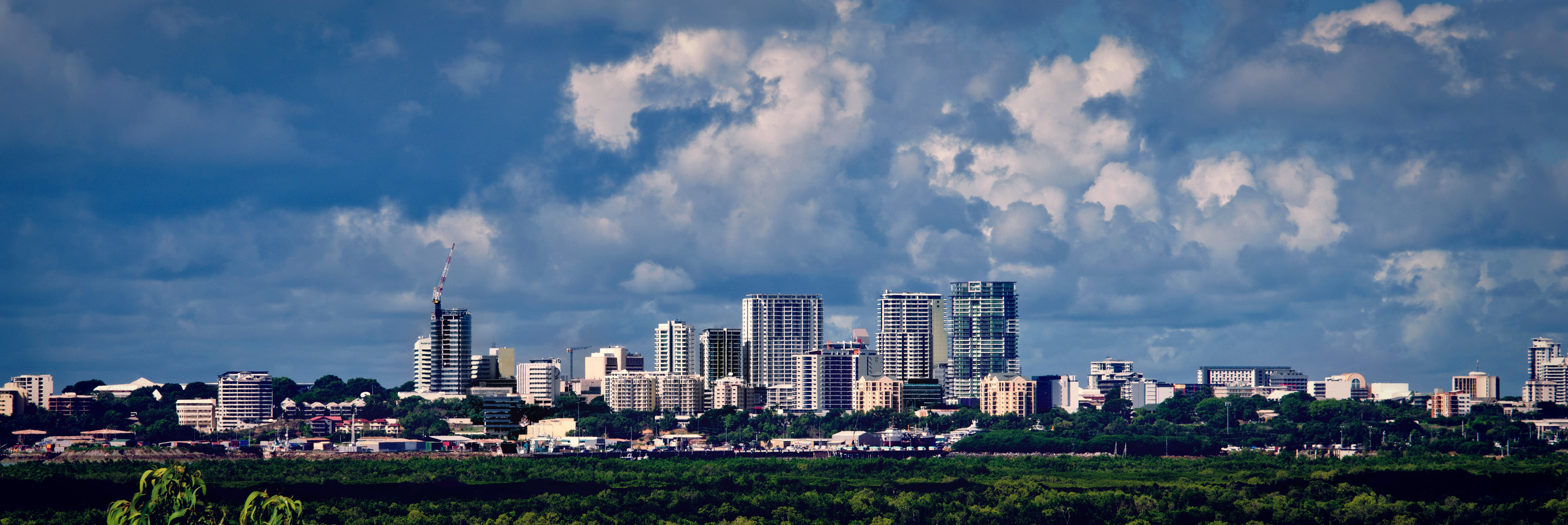
Darwin is the capital and largest city in the Northern Territory

The Northern Territory's population is the youngest in Australia and has the largest proportion (23.2%) under 15 years of age and the smallest proportion (5.7%) aged 65 and over. The median age of residents of the Northern Territory is 31 years, six years younger than the national median age.

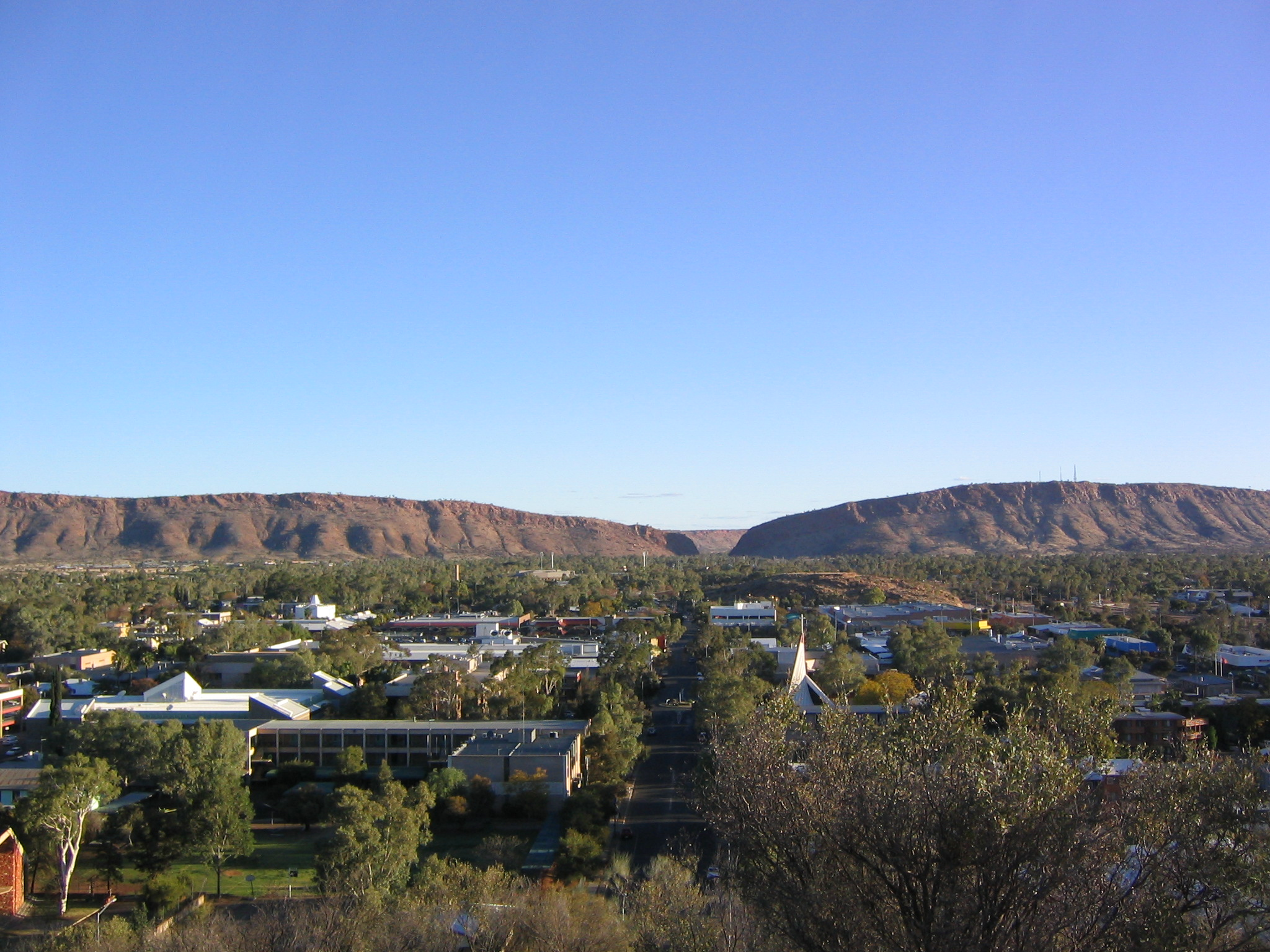
Alice Springs

Indigenous Australians make up 30.3% of population and own some 49% of the land. The life expectancy of Aboriginal Australians is well below that of non-Indigenous Australians in the Northern Territory, a fact that is mirrored elsewhere in Australia. ABS statistics suggest that Indigenous Australians die about 11 years earlier than the average non-Indigenous Australian.

There are Aboriginal communities in many parts of the territory, the largest ones being the Pitjantjatjara near Uluru / Ayers Rock, the Arrernte near Alice Springs, the Luritja between those two, the Warlpiri further north, and the Yolngu in eastern Arnhem Land.

In 2019, 147,255 people lived in Darwin, an overwhelming majority of the Territory's population. Despite this, the Northern Territory is the least urbanised jurisdiction in the Commonwealth (followed by Tasmania).

=== Cities and towns ===
Population by Significant Urban Areas (Note: According to the Australian Bureau of Statistics, Significant Urban Areas are defined to represent significant towns and cities, or agglomerations of smaller towns, that have at least 10,000 total population. Significant Urban Areas may contain more than one distinct Urban Centre. There are urban areas of greater than 10,000 people that the ABS does not currently classify as Significant Urban Areas.) (Note: The ABS currently only defines two Significant Urban Areas within the Northern Territory.)
Rank	Significant Urban Areas	Population (2021 Census)	Ref.
1	Darwin	127,215	
2	Alice Springs	25,912	

Population by Urban Centres (Note: According to the Australian Bureau of Statistics, Urban Centres represent areas of concentrated urban development with populations of 1,000 people or more.) (Note: Only the 10 most populus Urban Centres are shown. For a complete list see: List of places in the Northern Territory by population)
Rank	Urban Centres	Population (2021 Census)	Ref.
1	Darwin	122,207	
2	Alice Springs	24,855	
3	Katherine	5,980	
4	Nhulunbuy	3,267	
5	Tennant Creek	2,949	
6	Elcho Island / Galiwinku	2,199	
7	Wadeye	1,924	
8	Wurrumiyanga (Nguiu)	1,421	
9	Gunbalanya (Oenpelli)	1,153	
10	Milingimbi	1,097	

Population by Local Government Area (Note: Only the 10 most populus Local Government Areas are shown. For a complete list see: List of places in the Northern Territory by population)
Rank	Local Government Areas	Population (30 June 2023 estimate)
1	City of Darwin	85,465
2	City of Palmerston	41,113
3	Town of Alice Springs	29,213
4	Litchfield	23,415
5	Town of Katherine	10,829
6	East Arnhem Region	10,011
7	Roper Gulf Region	7,491
8	Barkly Region	7,239
9	MacDonnell Region	6,706
10	Central Desert Region	4,126

=== Ancestry and immigration ===
Country of Birth (2016)
Birthplace (Note: In accordance with the Australian Bureau of Statistics source, England, Scotland, Mainland China and the Special Administrative Regions of Hong Kong and Macau are listed separately)	Population
Australia	157,531
Philippines	5,914
England	5,583
New Zealand	4,636
India	3,598
Greece	1,268
United States	1,211
Mainland China	1,192
Nepal	1,126
Indonesia	1,117
Ireland	1,026
East Timor	1,024

At the 2016 census, the most commonly nominated ancestries were: (Note: As a percentage of 199,426 persons who nominated their ancestry at the 2016 census.)

- Indigenous (30.3%) (Note: Of any ancestry. Includes those identifying as Aboriginal Australians or Torres Strait Islanders. Indigenous identification is separate to the ancestry question on the Australian Census and persons identifying as Aboriginal or Torres Strait Islander may identify any ancestry.)
- Australian (28.1%) (Note: The Australian Bureau of Statistics has stated that most who nominate "Australian" as their ancestry are part of the Anglo-Celtic group.)
- English (27.5%)
- Irish (9.3%)
- Scottish (7.5%)
- German (4.4%)
- Filipino (3.5%)
- Chinese (3.1%)
- Indian (2.3%)
- Italian (2.1%)
- Greek (2%)
- Dutch (1.3%)

31.2% of the population was born overseas at the 2016 census. The five largest groups of overseas-born were from the Philippines (2.6%), England (2.4%), New Zealand (2%), India (1.6%) and Greece (0.6%).

25.5% of the population, or 58,248 people, identified as Indigenous Australians (Aboriginal Australians and Torres Strait Islanders) in 2016. (Note: Of any ancestry. Includes those identifying as Aboriginal Australians or Torres Strait Islanders. Indigenous identification is separate to the ancestry question on the Australian Census and persons identifying as Aboriginal or Torres Strait Islander may identify any ancestry.)

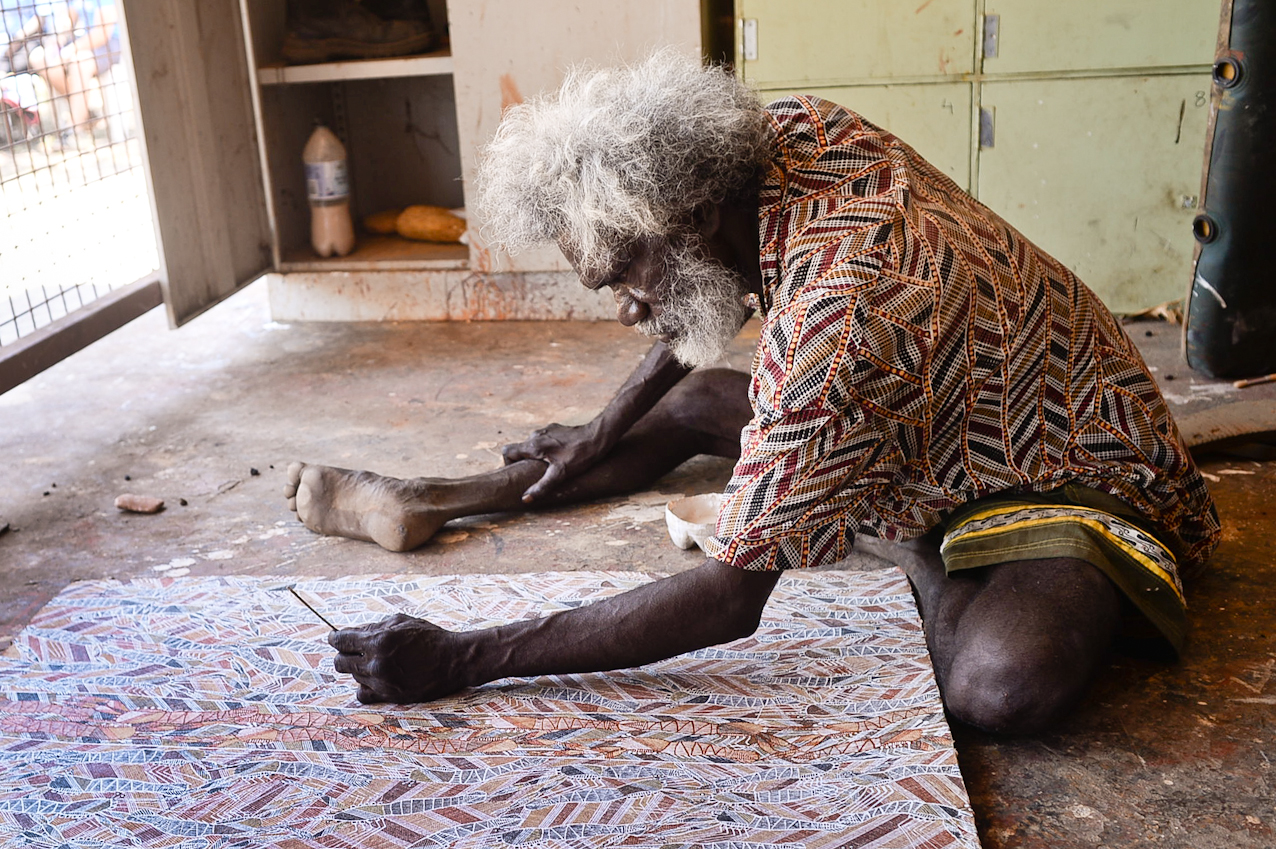
Kunwinjku artist Glen Namundja creating art in the style pioneered in Arnhem Land.

=== Languages ===
At the 2021 census, 57.3% of the population spoke only English at home. The other languages most commonly spoken at home were Kriol (2.2%), Djambarrpuyngu (1.7%), Greek (1.4%) and Nepali (1.3%).

There are more than 100 Aboriginal languages and dialects spoken in the Northern Territory, in addition to English which is most common in cities such as Darwin or Alice Springs. Major indigenous languages spoken in the Northern Territory include Murrinh-patha and Ngangikurrungurr in the northwest around Wadeye, Warlpiri and Warumungu in the centre around Tennant Creek, Arrernte around Alice Springs, and Pintupi-Luritja to the south east.

Pitjantjatjara is spoken in the south near Uluru / Ayers Rock, Yolngu Matha to the far north in Arnhem Land (where the dialect Djambarrpuyngu of Dhuwal is considered a lingua franca), and Burarra, Maung, Iwaidja and Kunwinjku in the centre north and on Croker Island and the Goulburn Islands. Tiwi is spoken on Melville Island and Bathurst Island. Literature in many of these languages is available in the Living Archive of Aboriginal Languages.

=== Religion ===
Religious Affiliation (2021)
1. Christianity (40.5%)
2. No Religion (38.5%)
3. Hinduism (2.70%)
4. Buddhism (2.40%)
5. Islam (1.40%)
6. Not Stated & Others (14.2%)

In the 2021 census, Christianity was the major Religious affiliation in Northern Territory, followed by 40.5% of its population. In 1971, Christianity was followed by 70.2% of the population and it has been declining since. The percentage of people who identified as having no religious affiliation has increased from 17.9% in 1971, to 38.5% in 2021.

In 2021, Hinduism was the territory's largest non-Christian religion (2.7%), followed by Buddhism (2.1%) and Islam (1.4%).

== Education ==
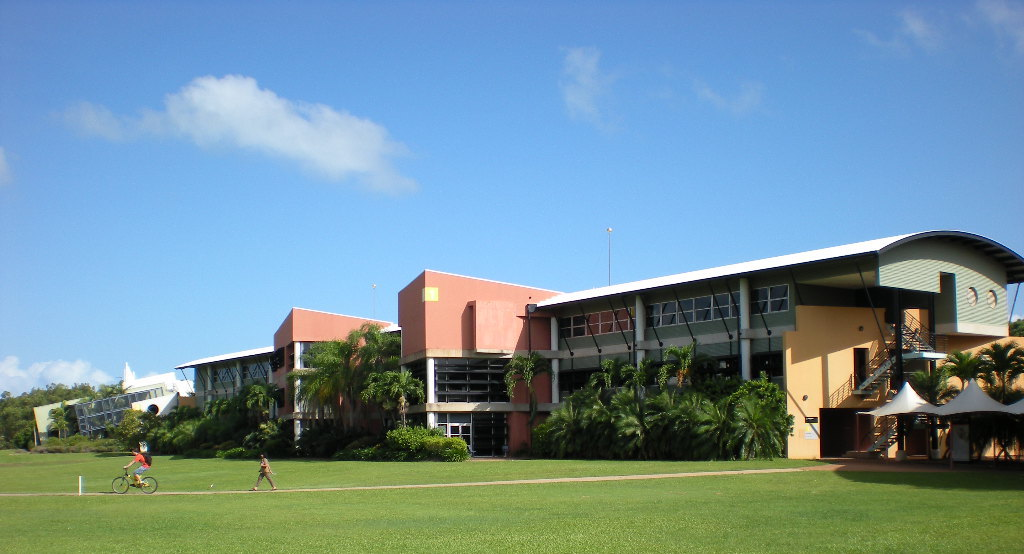
Charles Darwin University

=== Primary and secondary ===
A Northern Territory school education consists of six years of primary schooling, including one transition year, three years of middle schooling, and three years of secondary schooling. In the beginning of 2007, the Northern Territory introduced Middle School for Years 7–9 and High School for Years 10–12. In 2026, the territory is transitioning middle schools into high schools in order to align with the rest of the country. Northern Territory children generally begin school at age five. On completing secondary school, students earn the Northern Territory Certificate of Education and Training (NTCET). Students who successfully complete their secondary education also receive a tertiary entrance ranking, or ATAR score, to determine university admittance.

Northern Territory schools are either publicly or privately funded. Public schools, also known as state or government schools, are funded and run directly by the Department of Education. Private fee-paying schools include schools run by the Catholic Church and independent schools, some elite ones similar to English public schools. Some Northern Territory Independent schools are affiliated with Protestant, Lutheran, Anglican, Greek Orthodox or Seventh-day Adventist Churches, but include non-church schools and an Indigenous school.

In 2009, the Northern Territory had 151 public schools, 15 Catholic schools and 21 independent schools. 39,492 students were enrolled in schools around the territory with 29,175 in public schools, and 9,882 in independent schools. The Northern Territory has about 4,000 full-time teachers.

=== Tertiary ===
The Northern Territory has one university which opened in 1989 under the name of the Northern Territory University. Now renamed as the Charles Darwin University, it had about 19,000 students enrolled: about 5,500 higher education students and about 13,500 students on vocational education and training (VET) courses. The first tertiary institution in the territory was the Batchelor Institute of Indigenous Tertiary Education, which was established in the mid-1960s.

=== Libraries and archives ===
Library & Archives NT is the Northern Territory's public research library and archival organisation and it supports the development of library services across the Territory by supporting public libraries. Library & Archives NT was formed in 2019 following the merge of the Northern Territory Archives Service and the Northern Territory Library. The National Archives of Australia also have a repository in Darwin, this is collocated with the Library & Archives NT repository at the Northern Territory Archives Centre.

== Economy ==
=== Mining ===
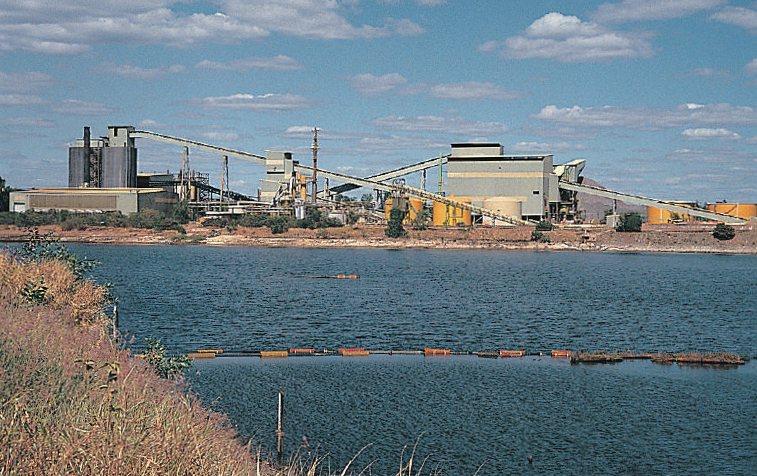
Ranger Uranium Mine in the Kakadu National Park.

The Northern Territory's economy is largely driven by mining, which is concentrated on energy producing minerals, petroleum and energy. In 2011, mining and resources contributed around $2.5 billion to the gross state product and employed over 4,600 people. Mining accounted for 14.9% of the gross state product in 2014–15 compared to just 7% nationally.

In 2016, largely due to the effect of major infrastructure projects and mine expansions, construction overtook mining as the largest single industry in the territory. Construction, mining and manufacturing, and government and community services, combine to account for about half of the territory's gross state product (GSP), compared to about a third of national gross domestic product (GDP).

The economy has grown from a value of $15 billion in 2004–05 to over $22 billion in 2014–15. In 2012–13 the territory economy expanded by 5.6%, over twice the level of national growth. In 2014–15 it grew by 10.5%, four times the national growth rate.

Between 2003 and 2006 the gross state product had risen from $8.67 billion to $11.476 billion, an increase of 32.4%. During the three years to 2006–2007 the Northern Territory gross state product grew by an average annual rate of 5.5%. Gross state product per capita in the Northern Territory ($72,496) is higher than any Australian state or territory and is also higher than the gross domestic product per capita for Australia ($54,606).

The Northern Territory's exports were up 12.9% or $681 million in 2012–13. The largest contributor to the territory's exports was: mineral fuels (largely LNG), crude materials (mainly mineral ores) and food and live animals, primarily live cattle. In 2014, the main international markets for territory exports are Japan, China, Indonesia, the United States and Korea.

In 2007, imports to the Northern Territory totalled $2,887.8 million which consisted of mainly machinery and equipment manufacturing (58.4%) and petroleum, coal, chemical and associated product manufacturing (17.0%).

In 2007, the principal mining operations were bauxite at Gove Peninsula, where the production is estimated to increase 52.1% to $254 million in 2007–08, manganese at Groote Eylandt, production is estimated to increase 10.5% to $1.1 billion which will be helped by the newly developed mines include Bootu Creek and Frances Creek, gold which is estimated to increase 21.7 per cent to $672 million at the Union Reefs plant and uranium at Ranger Uranium Mine.

=== Tourism ===
Tourism is an important economic driver for the territory and a significant industry in regional areas. Iconic destinations such as Uluru / Ayers Rock and Kakadu make the Northern Territory a popular destination for domestic and international travellers. Diverse landscapes, waterfalls, wide open spaces, aboriginal culture and wild and untamed wildlife provides the opportunity for visitors to immerse themselves in the natural wonder that the Northern Territory offers. In 2015, the territory received a total of about 1.6 million domestic and international visitors contributing an estimated $2.0 billion to the local economy. Holiday visitors made up the majority of total visitation (about 792,000 visitors).

Tourism has strong links to other sectors in the economy including accommodation and food services, retail trade, recreation and culture, and transport.Wide Open Space is an annual festival of music, arts and culture that takes place over three days at the Ross River Resort in the McDonnell Ranges, around 80 km (50 mi) east of Alice Springs, over three days in April/May.

=== Other industries ===
In 2021, the Northern Territory announced that it will undertake a project which will benefit its marine industry, including the development of a new Marine Industry Park near Darwin.

== Transport ==
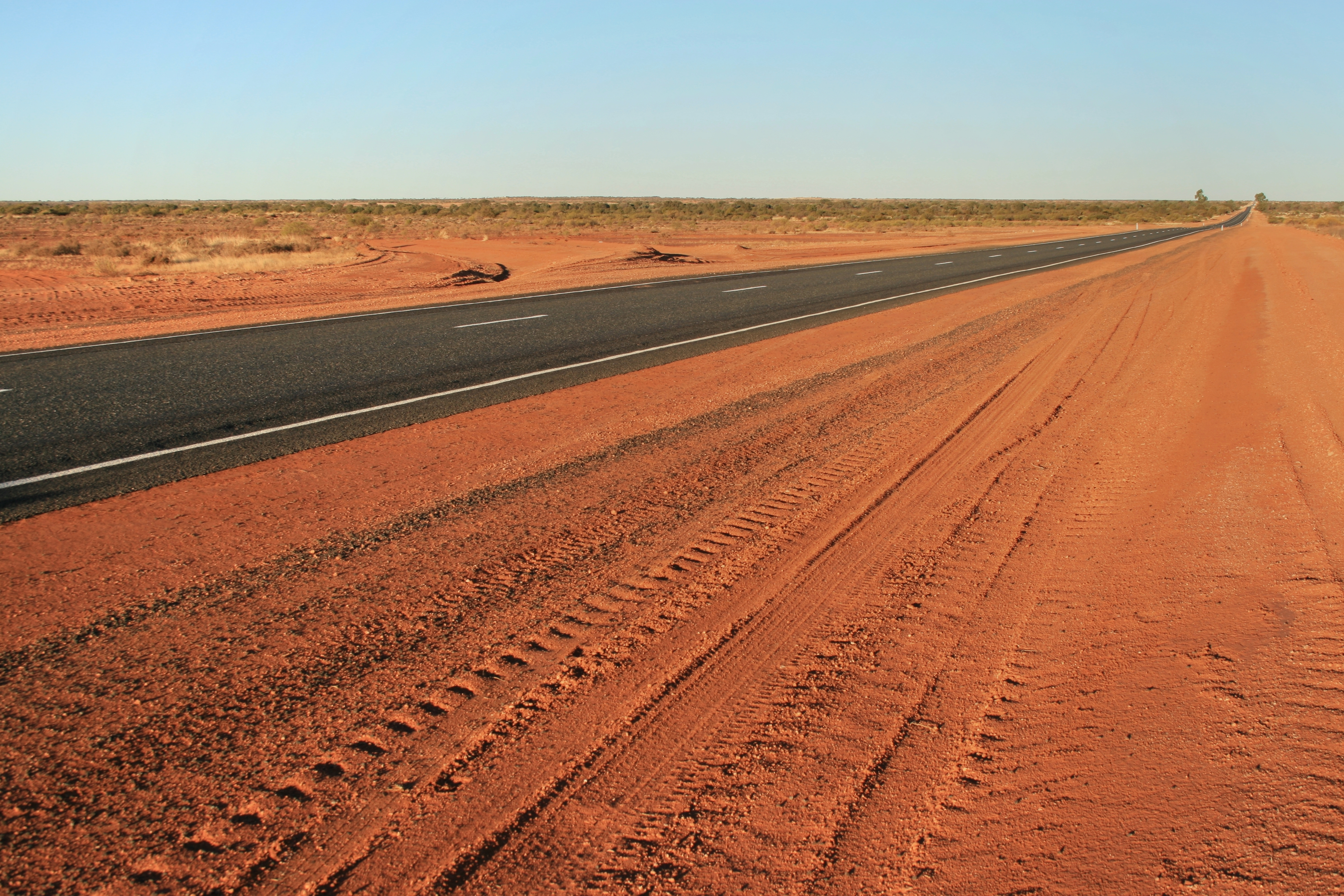
The Lasseter Highway connects Uluru (Ayers Rock) to the Stuart Highway.

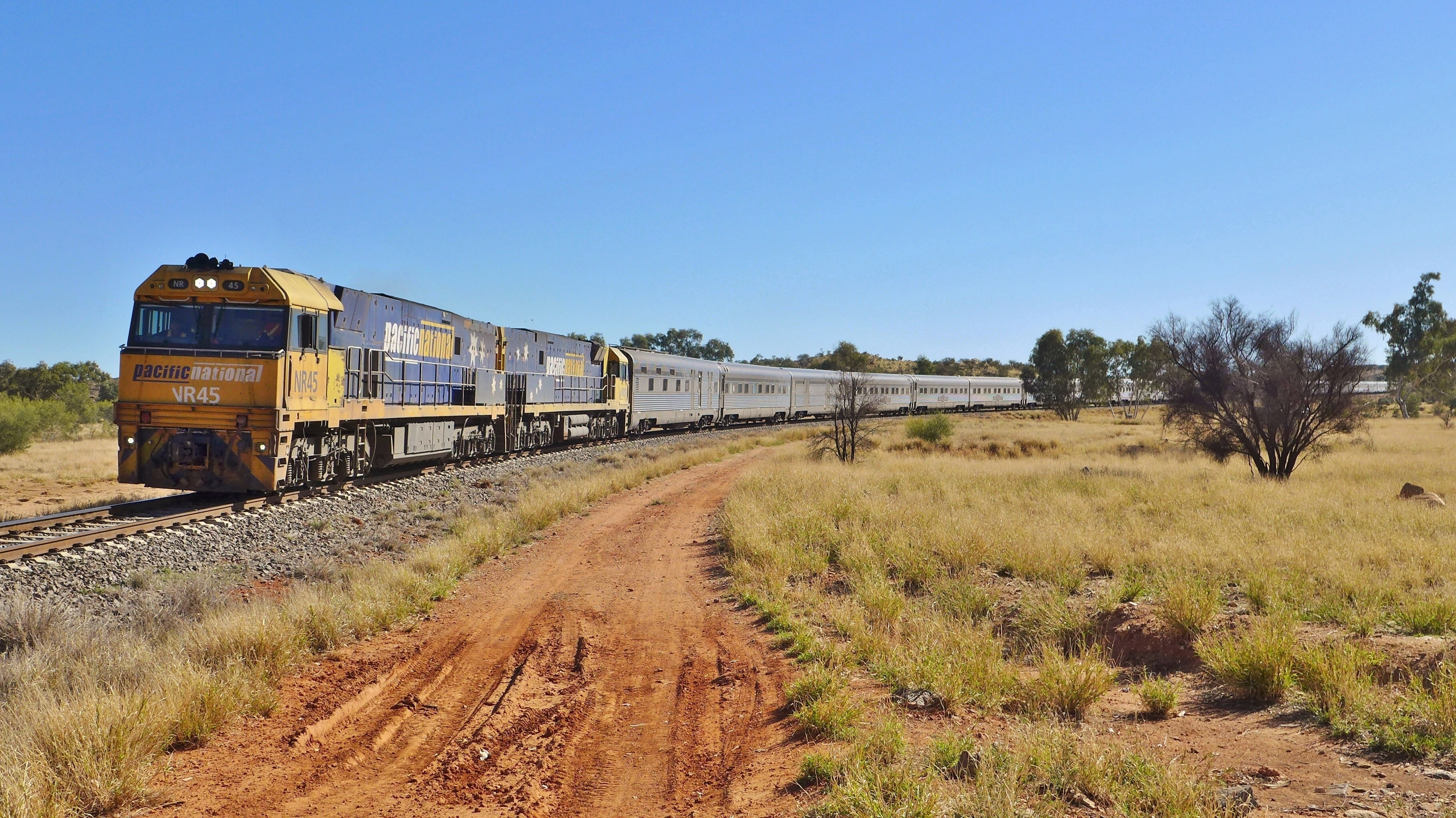
The Ghan.

The Northern Territory is the most sparsely populated state or territory in Australia.

The NT has a connected network of sealed roads, including two national highways, linking with adjoining states and connecting the major territory population centres, and other important centres such as Uluru (Ayers Rock), Kakadu and Litchfield National Parks. The Stuart Highway, once known as "The Track", runs north to south, connecting Darwin and Alice Springs to Adelaide. Some of the sealed roads are single-lane bitumen. Many unsealed (dirt) roads connect the more remote settlements.

The fatigue resulting from long-distance driving and the hazards inherent in dirt roads, wildlife, water crossings and wild weather have led the Northern Territory Government to pursue road safety campaigns in English and several Aboriginal languages. Persuading people to drive at the right speed for the road conditions has been a key goal.

As of 2021, the Northern Territory's road vehicle speed limit in built-up areas was 60 kilometres per hour, unless the town had gazetted a lower default speed limit: many had chosen 50 km/h or lower. Outside most built-up areas the default speed limit was 110 km/h unless a speed limit sign stated otherwise. Reflecting the nature of the topography and very low population density, some sections of the Arnhem, Barkly, Stuart and Victoria highways had a maximum speed of 130 km/h.

In 2004, a standard gauge railway was opened between Alice Springs and Darwin, completing the Adelaide–Darwin rail corridor and bringing to fruition the dream of a transcontinental railway initiated in 1878 with the Central Australia Railway from the south and the North Australia Railway from the north – but with a gap of more than 800 km (500 mi) between Alice Springs and Birdum still to be bridged when the antique 1067 mm (3 ft 6 in) narrow-gauge railway was closed in 1976. The line carries fast freight trains and one passenger train: The Ghan experiential tourism train that runs between Darwin and Adelaide, stopping in the NT at Katherine, Tennant Creek, Alice Springs and Kulgera.

Darwin International Airport is the major domestic and international airport for the territory. Several smaller airports are also scattered throughout the territory and are served by smaller airlines, including Alice Springs Airport, Ayers Rock Airport, Katherine Airport and Tennant Creek Airport.

== Media ==
=== Print ===
The Northern Territory has only one daily tabloid newspaper, News Corporation's Northern Territory News, or NT News. The Sunday Territorian is the sister paper to the NT News and is the only dedicated Sunday tabloid newspaper in the Northern Territory.

The Centralian Advocate is circulated around the Alice Springs region twice a week. There are also five weekly community newspapers. The territory receives the national daily, The Australian, while The Sydney Morning Herald, The Age and The Guardian Weekly are also available in Darwin. Katherine's paper is the Katherine Times.

There is an LGBT community publication, QNews Magazine, which is published in Darwin and Alice Springs.

=== Television ===
Metropolitan Darwin has had five broadcast television stations:

- ABC Northern Territory – (ABD)
- SBS Northern Territory – (SBS)
- Southern Cross Seven – (TND) – Seven Network Affiliate, Owned and operated station
- Nine Network Darwin – (NTD) - Owned and operated station
- Ten Darwin (or Darwin Digital Television) – (DTD) – Network Ten Affiliate

Darwin also has four open-narrowcast stations:

- First Nations TV
- Darwin TV
- First Nations Tourism TV
- Business TV

Regional Northern Territory has a similar availability of stations:

- ABC Northern Territory – (ABD)
- SBS Northern Territory – (SBS)
- Seven Central – (QQQ) – Seven Network Affiliate
- Imparja – (IMP) – Nine Network Affiliate
- Ten Central (or Central Digital Television) – (CDT) – Network Ten Affiliate

Remote areas are generally required to receive television via the Viewer Access Satellite Television service, which carries the same channels as the regional areas, as well as some extra open-narrowcast services, including Indigenous Community Television and Westlink.

=== Radio ===
Darwin has radio stations on both AM and FM frequencies. ABC stations include ABC Radio Darwin (105.7FM), ABC Radio National (657AM), ABC News Radio (102.5FM), ABC Classic FM (107.3FM) and Triple J (103.3FM). The two commercial stations are Hot 100 FM (8HOT) and Mix 104.9 (8MIX). The leading community stations are 104.1 Territory FM (8TOP) and 94.5 Radio Larrakia (8KNB).

The radio stations in Alice Springs are also broadcast on the AM and FM frequencies. ABC stations include Triple J (94.9FM), ABC Classic FM (97.9FM), 783 ABC Alice Springs (783AM), ABC News Radio (104.1FM) and ABC Radio National (99.7FM). There are two community stations in the town—CAAMA (100.5FM) and 8CCC (102.1FM). The commercial stations, which are both owned by the same company are Sun 96.9 (96.9FM) and 8HA (900AM). Christian radio station Vision Christian Radio (88.0FM). Two additional stations, Territory FM (98.7FM) and Radio TAB (95.9FM) are syndicated from Darwin and Brisbane, respectively.

=== Music ===
The music scene of the Northern Territory is home to a few major musical artists, who mainly use the genres of Hip-Hop and RNB as their music style. However, the Rock, Country and Punk scene holds a significantly bigger number of smaller, lesser known bands. The most popular artists from the Northern Territory include:

- Jessica Mauboy
- Baker Boy
- Caiti Baker
- David Garnham and the Reasons To Live
- Roymackonkey
- Kuya James
- Crystal Robins
- Tang

The NT also has a frequently active live music scene, with its main festival, Bass in the Grass being the most popular and biggest show throughout the year. The show often has acts from overseas play, and this attracts significantly higher tourism than normal.

== Sport ==
Australian rules football in the Northern Territory is widely popular, particularly with Indigenous Australian communities in Darwin, Alice Springs and the Tiwi Islands. The governing body for football in the territory is the AFL Northern Territory.

== Culture ==
The Northern Territory is home to a number of cultural institutions of importance to the nation.

These include:

- Araluen Art Centre and the Museum of Central Australia; within the Araluen Cultural Precinct
- The Darwin Symphony Orchestra
- The Museum and Art Gallery of the Northern Territory
- Library & Archives NT
- The Strehlow Research Centre

== See also ==
- Australian Aboriginal prehistoric sites
- Crime in the Northern Territory
- Juvenile detention in the Northern Territory
- Northern Territory Police
- List of highways in the Northern Territory
- Category:Cities in the Northern Territory
- Category:Towns in the Northern Territory

== Sources ==
- Hill, Ernestine. 1951. The Territory: The classic saga of Australia's far north. Angus & Robertson. Reprint: 1995. ISBN 0-207-18821-1
- Govan, A. (2007) Broadband debate key to NT's future. N.T. Business Review, vol. N/A, no. N/A, p. 7
- Morrison, P. (2000) a pilot implementation of internet access for remote aboriginal communities in the "Top end" Of Australia. Urban Studies, Vol. 37, No.10, pp. 1781–1792.
- Taçon; May; Fallon; Travers (2010). n.t.
- Toyne, P. (2002) Northern Territory Government's Response to the House of Representatives Communications, Information Technology & the Arts Committee inquiry into Wireless Broadband Communications. In N.T. GOVERNMENT (Ed.) (pp. 3). Darwin: Northern Territory Government.
- Toyne, P. (2003) Remote Areas Telecommunications Strategy 2003–2008. In N. T. GOVERNMENT (Ed.) (pp. 1– 32). Darwin N.T. viewed 6 February 2008, <Wayback Machine>
