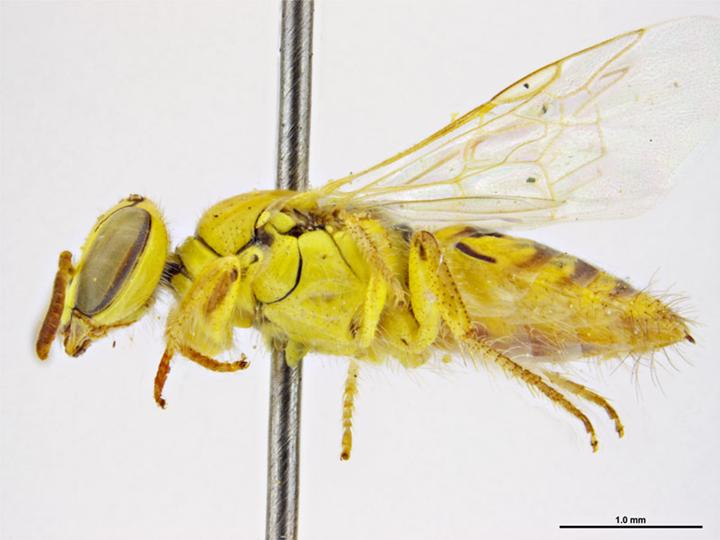
- Female

Scientific classification
- Kingdom: Animalia
- Phylum: Arthropoda
- Clade: Pancrustacea
- Class: Insecta
- Order: Hymenoptera
- Family: Colletidae
- Genus: Xanthesma
- Species: X. vittata

Binomial name
- Xanthesma vittata Exley, 1969

= Xanthesma vittata =

Species of bee

Xanthesma vittata, or Xanthesma (Xanthesma) vittata, is a species of bee in the family Colletidae and the subfamily Euryglossinae. It is endemic to Australia. It was described in 1969 by Australian entomologist Elizabeth Exley.

== Distribution and habitat ==
The species occurs in central Australia. The type locality is 22 km north of Barrow Creek in the south of the Northern Territory. Other published localities are Dedari and Coolgardie in Western Australia.

== Behaviour ==
The adults are flying mellivores.

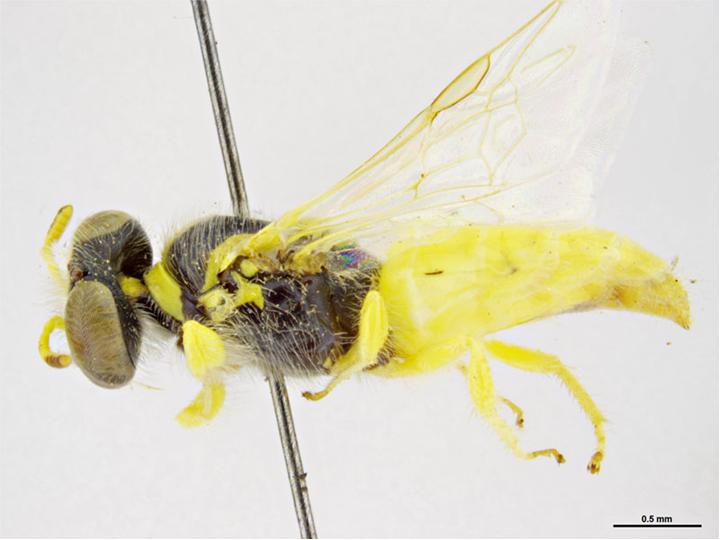
Male
