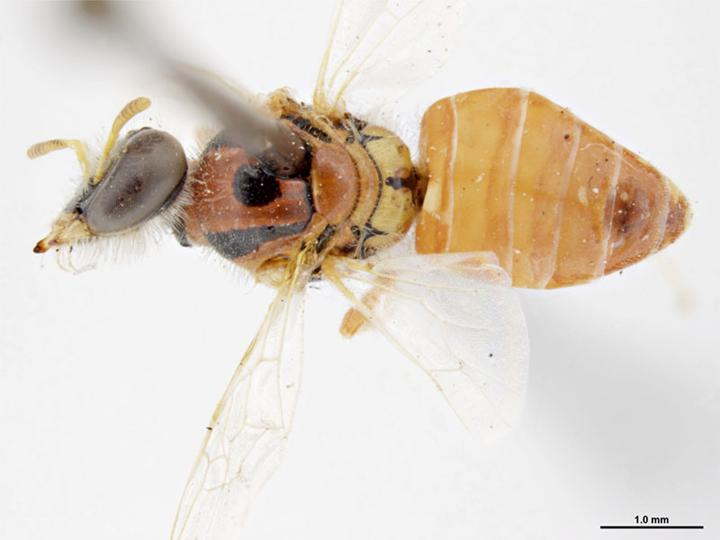
- Male

Scientific classification
- Kingdom: Animalia
- Phylum: Arthropoda
- Clade: Pancrustacea
- Class: Insecta
- Order: Hymenoptera
- Family: Colletidae
- Genus: Xanthesma
- Species: X. hirsutoscapa

Binomial name
- Xanthesma hirsutoscapa (Exley, 1969)

Synonyms
- Euryglossa (Xenohesma) hirsutoscapa Exley, 1969

= Xanthesma hirsutoscapa =

Species of bee

Xanthesma hirsutoscapa, or Xanthesma (Xenohesma) hirsutoscapa, is a species of bee in the family Colletidae and the subfamily Euryglossinae. It is endemic to Australia. It was described in 1969 by Australian entomologist Elizabeth Exley.

== Distribution and habitat ==
The species occurs in the Kimberley region of northern Western Australia. The type locality is Langi Crossing, some 140 km east of Broome, on the Fitzroy River.

== Behaviour ==
The adults are flying mellivores.
