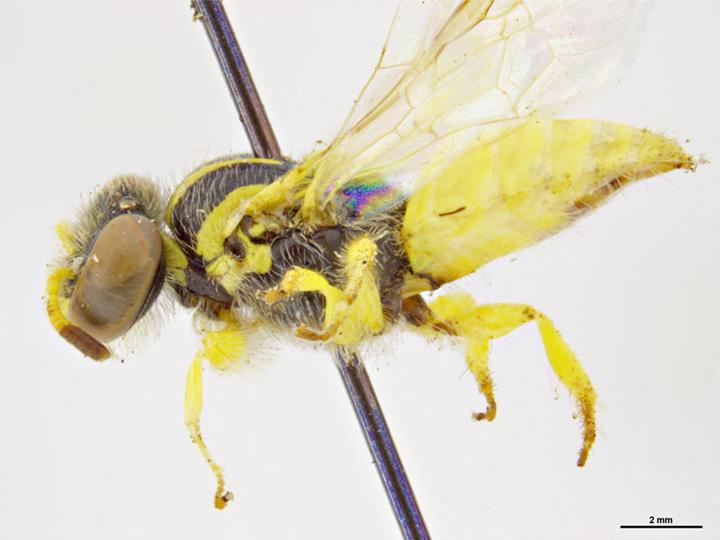
- Male

Scientific classification
- Kingdom: Animalia
- Phylum: Arthropoda
- Clade: Pancrustacea
- Class: Insecta
- Order: Hymenoptera
- Family: Colletidae
- Genus: Xanthesma
- Species: X. stagei

Binomial name
- Xanthesma stagei (Exley, 1969)

Synonyms
- Euryglossa (Xenohesma) stagei Exley, 1969

= Xanthesma stagei =

Species of bee

Xanthesma stagei, or Xanthesma (Xenohesma) stagei, is a species of bee in the family Colletidae and the subfamily Euryglossinae. It is endemic to Australia. It was described in 1969 by Australian entomologist Elizabeth Exley.

== Distribution and habitat ==
The species occurs across northern Australia. The type locality is 64 km south-east of Wyndham in the Kimberley region.

== Behaviour ==
The adults are flying mellivores. Flowering plants visited by the bees include Eucalyptus species.

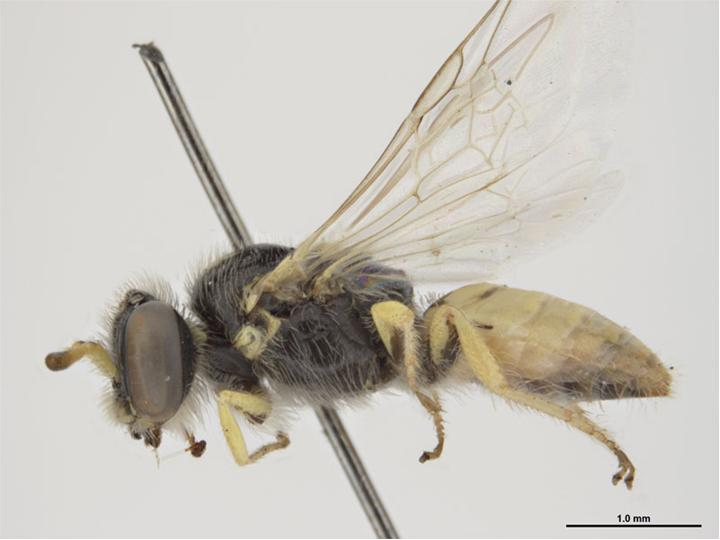
Female
