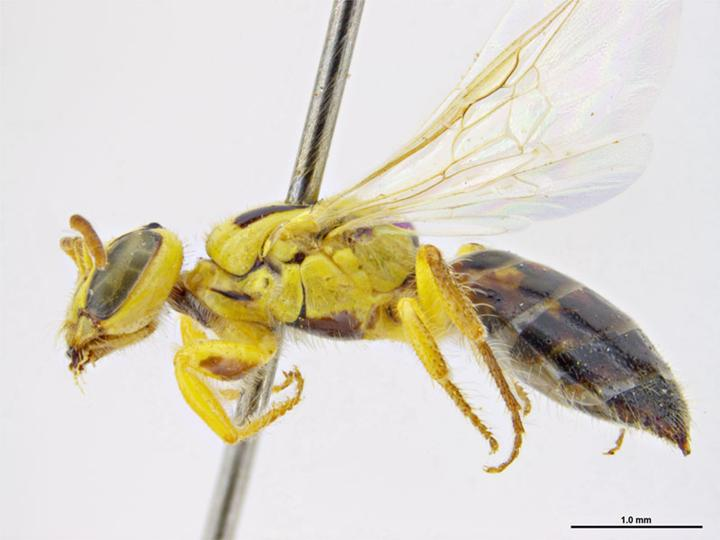
- Female

Scientific classification
- Kingdom: Animalia
- Phylum: Arthropoda
- Clade: Pancrustacea
- Class: Insecta
- Order: Hymenoptera
- Family: Colletidae
- Genus: Xanthesma
- Species: X. infuscata

Binomial name
- Xanthesma infuscata (Exley, 1978)

Synonyms
- Chaetohesma infuscata Exley, 1978

= Xanthesma infuscata =

Species of bee

Xanthesma infuscata, or Xanthesma (Chaetohesma) infuscata, is a species of bee in the family Colletidae and the subfamily Euryglossinae. It is endemic to Australia. It was described in 1978 by Australian entomologist Elizabeth Exley.

== Distribution and habitat ==
The species occurs in south-eastern inland Australia. The type locality is 2 km west of St George in southern Queensland. Other published localities are Cunnamulla, as well as Bourke and Moree in New South Wales.

== Behaviour ==
The adults are flying mellivores. Flowering plants visited by the bees include Eucalyptus, Angophora, Capparis and Convolvulus species.

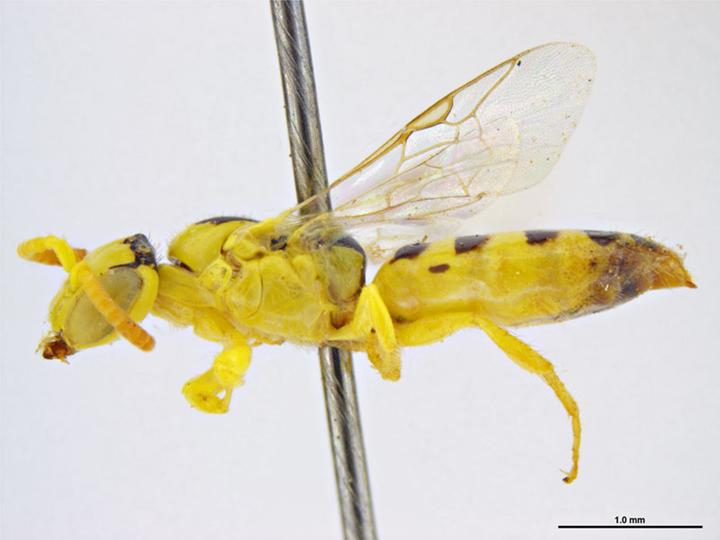
Male
