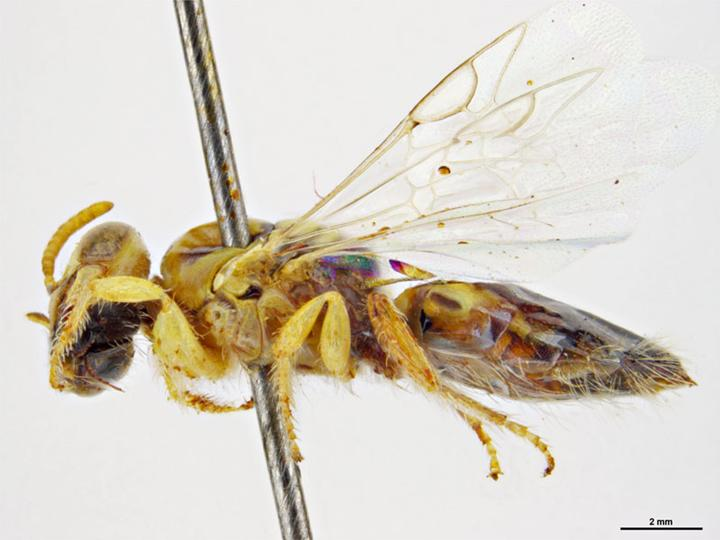
- Female

Scientific classification
- Kingdom: Animalia
- Phylum: Arthropoda
- Clade: Pancrustacea
- Class: Insecta
- Order: Hymenoptera
- Family: Colletidae
- Genus: Xanthesma
- Species: X. megastigma

Binomial name
- Xanthesma megastigma (Exley, 1978)

Synonyms
- Chaetohesma megastigma Exley, 1978

= Xanthesma megastigma =

Species of bee

Xanthesma megastigma, or Xanthesma (Chaetohesma) megastigma, is a species of bee in the family Colletidae and the subfamily Euryglossinae. It is endemic to Australia. It was described in 1978 by Australian entomologist Elizabeth Exley.

== Distribution and habitat ==
The species occurs in the Mid West region of Western Australia. The type locality is 12 km north of the Murchison River crossing on the North West Coastal Highway. It has also been recorded from Nabawa.

== Behaviour ==
The adults are flying mellivores. Flowering plants visited by the bees include Eucalyptus species.

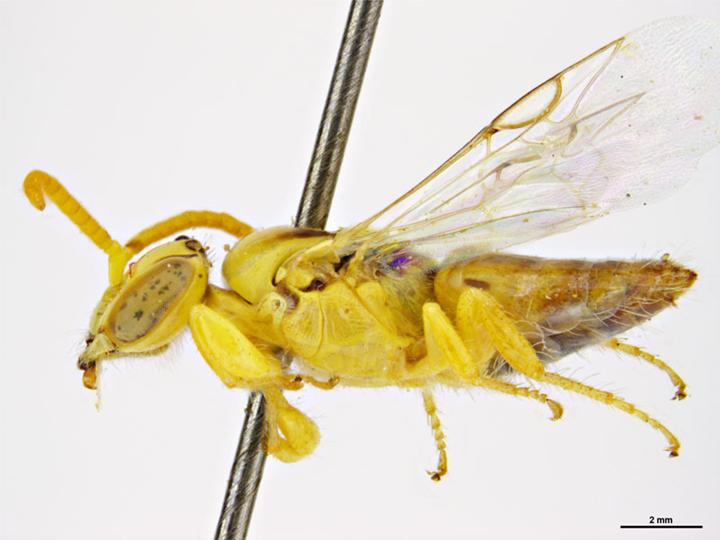
Male
