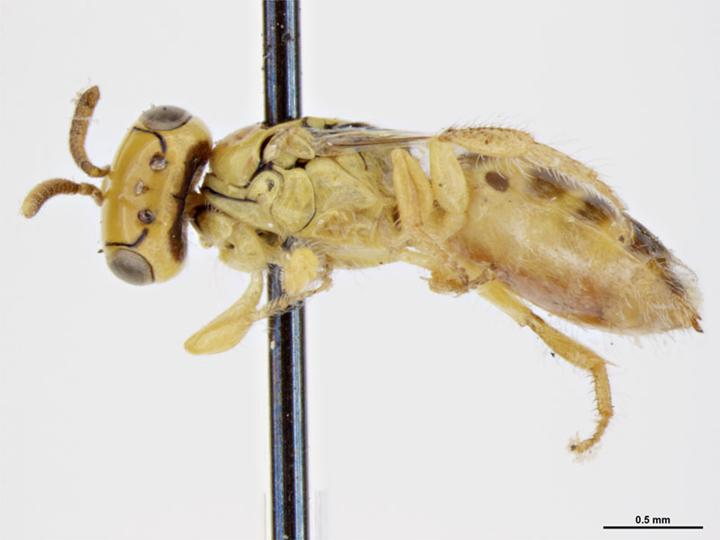
- Female

Scientific classification
- Kingdom: Animalia
- Phylum: Arthropoda
- Clade: Pancrustacea
- Class: Insecta
- Order: Hymenoptera
- Family: Colletidae
- Genus: Xanthesma
- Species: X. lucida

Binomial name
- Xanthesma lucida (Exley, 1974)

Synonyms
- Argohesma lucida Exley, 1974

= Xanthesma lucida =

Species of bee

Xanthesma lucida, or Xanthesma (Argohesma) lucida, is a species of bee in the family Colletidae and the subfamily Euryglossinae. It is endemic to Australia. It was described in 1974 by Australian entomologist Elizabeth Exley.

== Distribution and habitat ==
The species occurs in the Goldfields–Esperance region of Western Australia. The type locality is 80 km west of Coolgardie.

== Behaviour ==
The adults are flying mellivores. Flowering plants visited by the bees include Eucalyptus species.

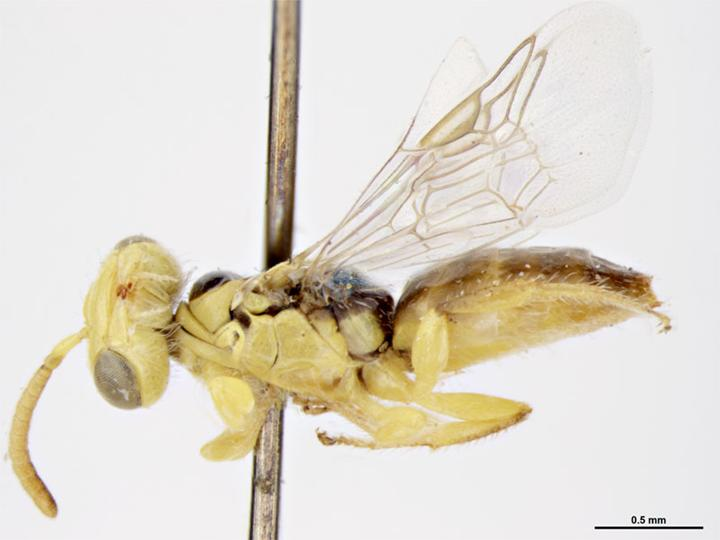
Male
