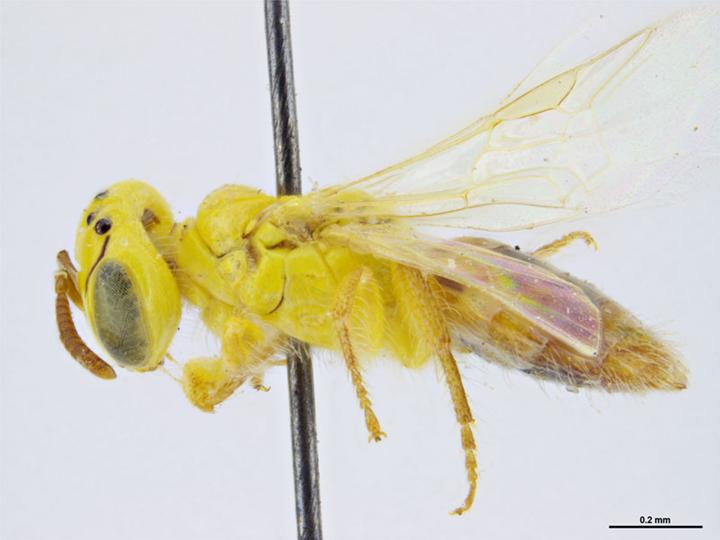
- Female

Scientific classification
- Kingdom: Animalia
- Phylum: Arthropoda
- Clade: Pancrustacea
- Class: Insecta
- Order: Hymenoptera
- Family: Colletidae
- Genus: Xanthesma
- Species: X. argosomata

Binomial name
- Xanthesma argosomata Exley, 1969

= Xanthesma argosomata =

Species of bee

Xanthesma argosomata, or Xanthesma (Xanthesma) argosomata, is a species of bee in the family Colletidae and the subfamily Euryglossinae. It is endemic to Australia. It was described in 1969 by Australian entomologist Elizabeth Exley.

== Distribution and habitat ==
The species occurs in southern South Australia. The type locality is Tusmore in Adelaide. It has also been recorded from Meningie.

== Behaviour ==
The adults are solitary flying mellivores that nest in soil. Flowering plants visited by the bees include Eucalyptus species.

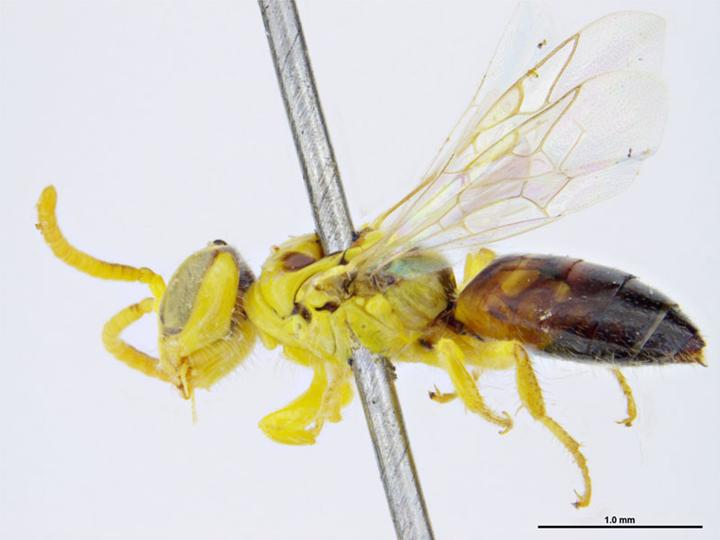
Male
