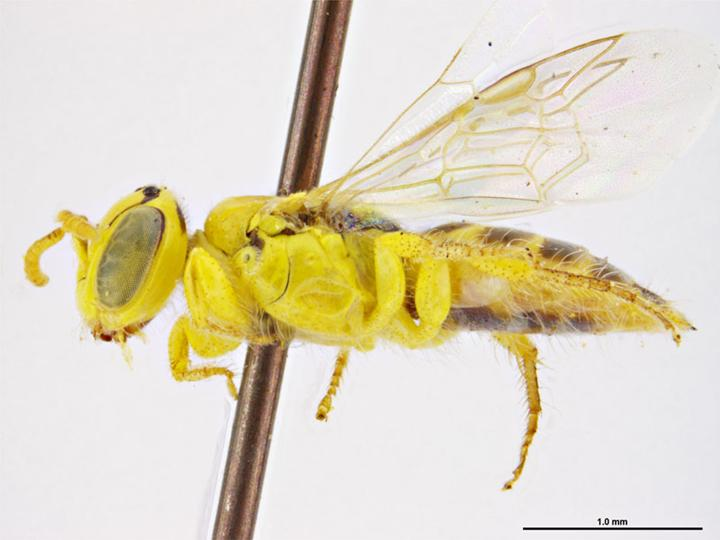
- Female

Scientific classification
- Kingdom: Animalia
- Phylum: Arthropoda
- Clade: Pancrustacea
- Class: Insecta
- Order: Hymenoptera
- Family: Colletidae
- Genus: Xanthesma
- Species: X. trisulca

Binomial name
- Xanthesma trisulca Exley, 1969

= Xanthesma trisulca =

Species of bee

Xanthesma trisulca, or Xanthesma (Xanthesma) trisulca, is a species of bee in the family Colletidae and the subfamily Euryglossinae. It is endemic to Australia. It was described in 1969 by Australian entomologist Elizabeth Exley.

== Distribution and habitat ==
The species occurs in Western Australia. The type locality is Yellowdine in the Goldfields–Esperance region.

== Behaviour ==
The adults are flying mellivores. Flowering plants visited by the bees include Eucalyptus species.

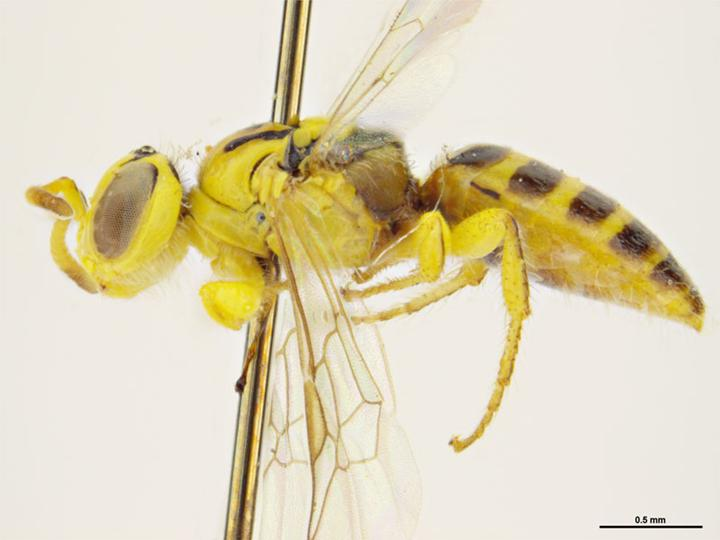
Male
