= Xanthesma evansi =

Scientific classification
- Kingdom: Animalia
- Phylum: Arthropoda
- Clade: Pancrustacea
- Class: Insecta
- Order: Hymenoptera
- Family: Colletidae
- Genus: Xanthesma
- Species: X. evansi

Binomial name
- Xanthesma evansi (Michener, 1965)

Synonyms
- Euryglossa (Xenohesma) evansi Michener, 1965

Species of bee

Xanthesma evansi, or Xanthesma (Xenohesma) evansi, is a species of bee in the family Colletidae and the subfamily Euryglossinae. It is endemic to Australia. It was described in 1965 by American entomologist Charles Duncan Michener.

== Distribution and habitat ==
The species occurs in South West Queensland. The type locality is Cunnamulla.

== Behaviour ==
The adults are flying mellivores.
