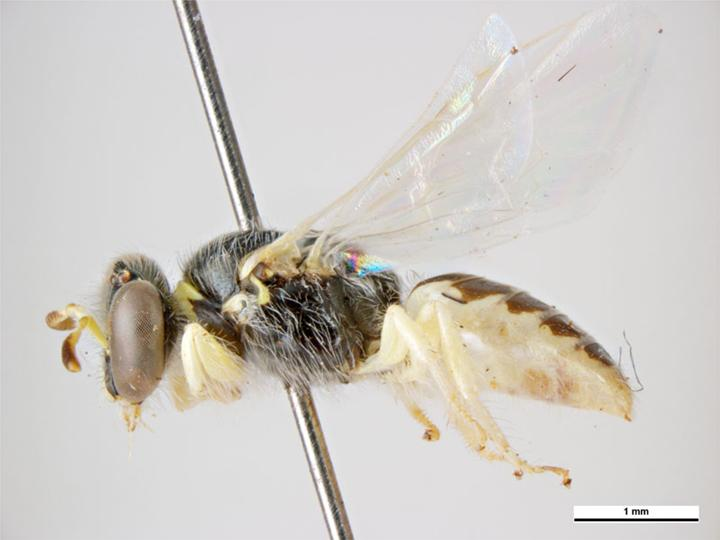
- Male

Scientific classification
- Kingdom: Animalia
- Phylum: Arthropoda
- Clade: Pancrustacea
- Class: Insecta
- Order: Hymenoptera
- Family: Colletidae
- Genus: Xanthesma
- Species: X. fasciata

Binomial name
- Xanthesma fasciata (Exley, 1969)

Synonyms
- Euryglossa (Xenohesma) fasciata Exley, 1969

= Xanthesma fasciata =

Species of bee

Xanthesma fasciata, or Xanthesma (Xenohesma) fasciata, is a species of bee in the family Colletidae and the subfamily Euryglossinae. It is endemic to Australia. It was described in 1969 by Australian entomologist Elizabeth Exley.

== Distribution and habitat ==
The species occurs in central Australia. The type locality is MacDonald Downs Station, some 280 km north-east of Alice Springs, in the southern part of the Northern Territory.

== Behaviour ==
The adults are flying mellivores.
