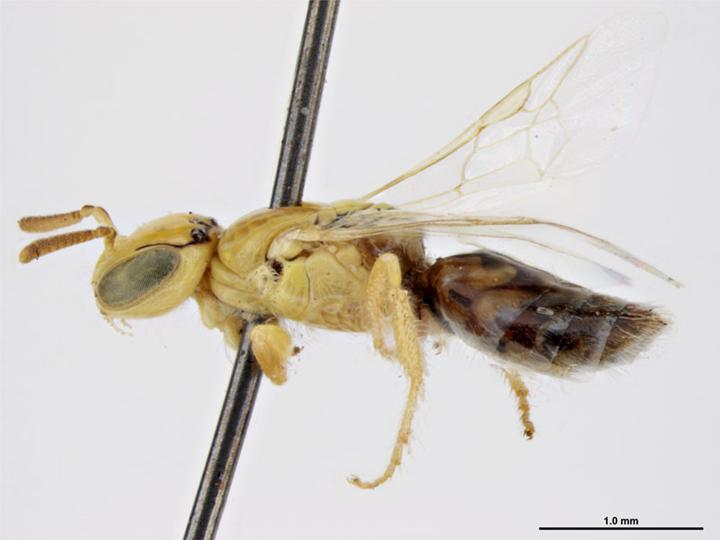
- Female

Scientific classification
- Kingdom: Animalia
- Phylum: Arthropoda
- Clade: Pancrustacea
- Class: Insecta
- Order: Hymenoptera
- Family: Colletidae
- Genus: Xanthesma
- Species: X. clara

Binomial name
- Xanthesma clara (Exley, 1974)

Synonyms
- Argohesma clara Exley, 1974

= Xanthesma clara =

Species of bee

Xanthesma clara, or Xanthesma (Argohesma) clara, is a species of bee in the family Colletidae and the subfamily Euryglossinae. It is endemic to Australia. It was described in 1974 by Australian entomologist Elizabeth Exley.

== Distribution and habitat ==
The species occurs in the Pilbara region of north-west Western Australia. The type locality is 11 km north-east of Karratha.

== Behaviour ==
The adults are flying mellivores. Flowering plants visited by the bees include Eucalyptus species.

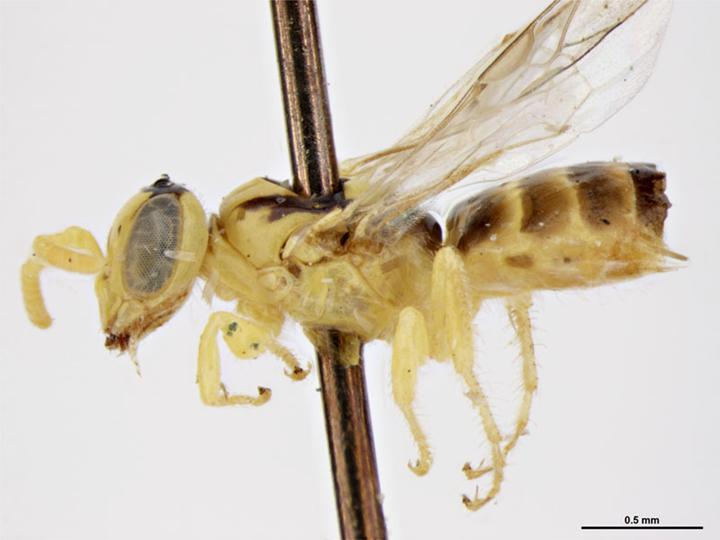
Male
