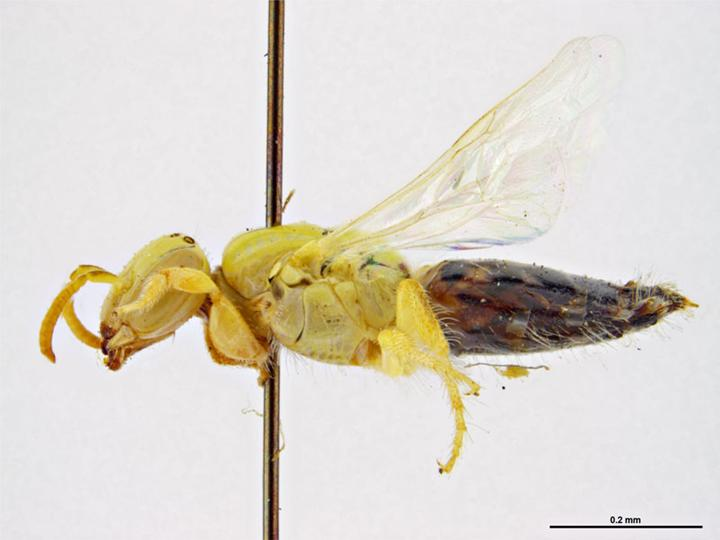
- Female

Scientific classification
- Kingdom: Animalia
- Phylum: Arthropoda
- Clade: Pancrustacea
- Class: Insecta
- Order: Hymenoptera
- Family: Colletidae
- Genus: Xanthesma
- Species: X. foveolata

Binomial name
- Xanthesma foveolata (Exley, 1978)

Synonyms
- Chaetohesma foveolata Exley, 1978

= Xanthesma foveolata =

Species of bee

Xanthesma foveolata , or Xanthesma (Chaetohesma) foveolata, is a species of bee in the family Colletidae and the subfamily Euryglossinae. It is endemic to Australia. It was described in 1978 by Australian entomologist Elizabeth Exley.

== Distribution and habitat ==
The species occurs in the Northern Territory. The type locality is 22 km west-south-west of Borroloola. It has also been recorded from Elizabeth River.

== Behaviour ==
The adults are flying mellivores. Flowering plants visited by the bees include Eucalyptus and Eugenia species.

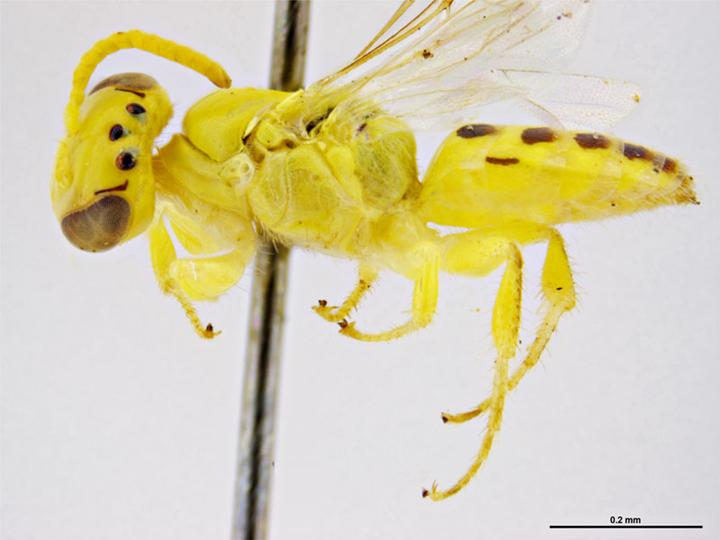
Male
