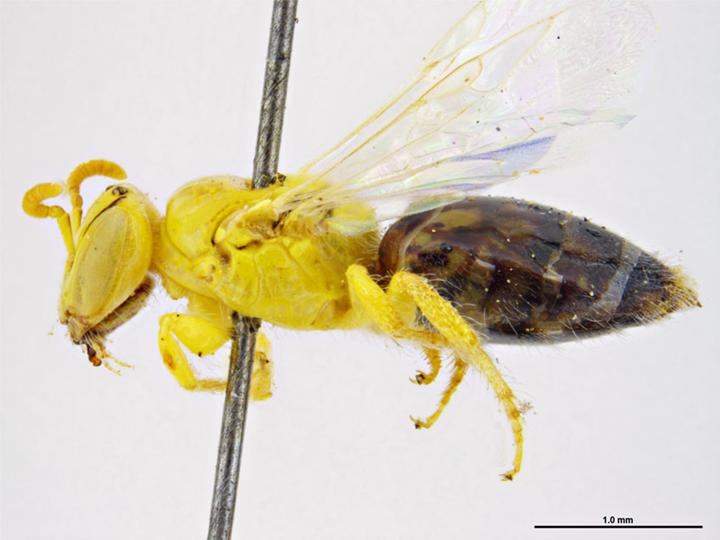
- Female

Scientific classification
- Kingdom: Animalia
- Phylum: Arthropoda
- Clade: Pancrustacea
- Class: Insecta
- Order: Hymenoptera
- Family: Colletidae
- Genus: Xanthesma
- Species: X. lutea

Binomial name
- Xanthesma lutea Exley, 1969

= Xanthesma lutea =

Species of bee

Xanthesma lutea, or Xanthesma (Xanthesma) lutea, is a species of bee in the family Colletidae and the subfamily Euryglossinae. It is endemic to Australia. It was described in 1969 by Australian entomologist Elizabeth Exley.

== Distribution and habitat ==
The species occurs in north-west Queensland. The type locality is Mica Creek, near Mount Isa.

== Behaviour ==
The adults are flying mellivores. Flowering plants visited by the bees include Eucalyptus species.

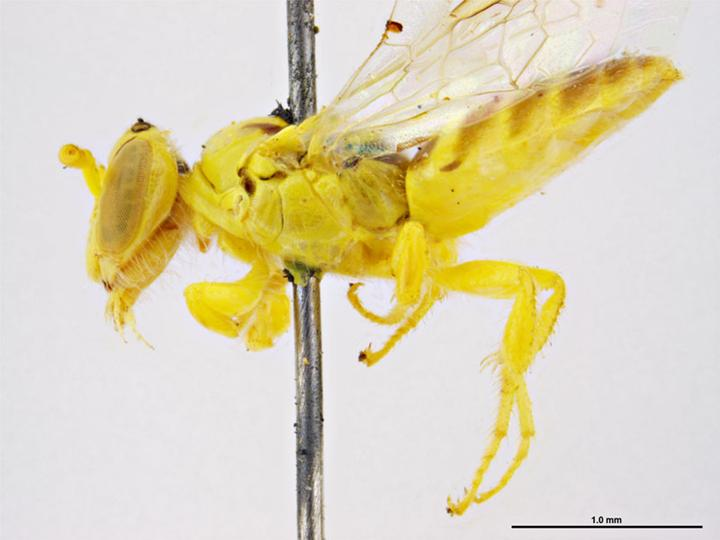
Male
