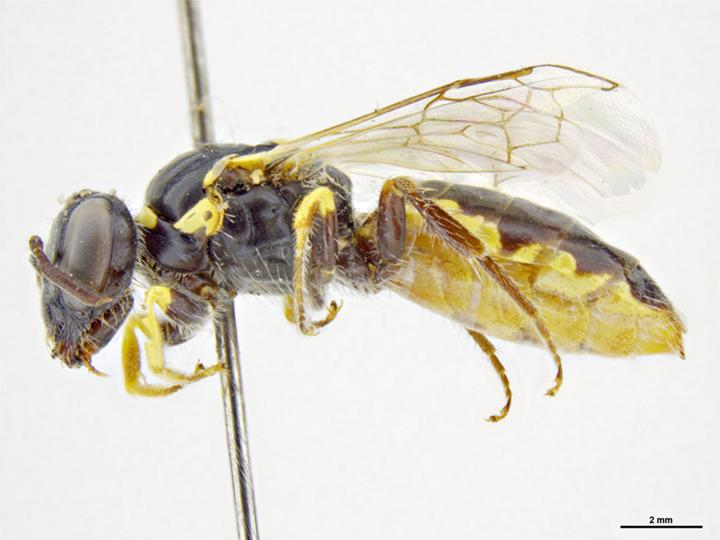
- Female

Scientific classification
- Kingdom: Animalia
- Phylum: Arthropoda
- Clade: Pancrustacea
- Class: Insecta
- Order: Hymenoptera
- Family: Colletidae
- Genus: Xanthesma
- Species: X. scutellaris

Binomial name
- Xanthesma scutellaris Michener, 1965

= Xanthesma scutellaris =

Species of bee

Xanthesma scutellaris, or Xanthesma (Xenohesma) scutellaris, is a species of bee in the family Colletidae and the subfamily Euryglossinae. It is endemic to Australia. It was described in 1965 by American entomologist Charles Duncan Michener.

== Distribution and habitat ==
The species occurs in the Wheatbelt region of Western Australia. The type locality is Seabrook, near Northam.

== Behaviour ==
The adults are flying mellivores.
