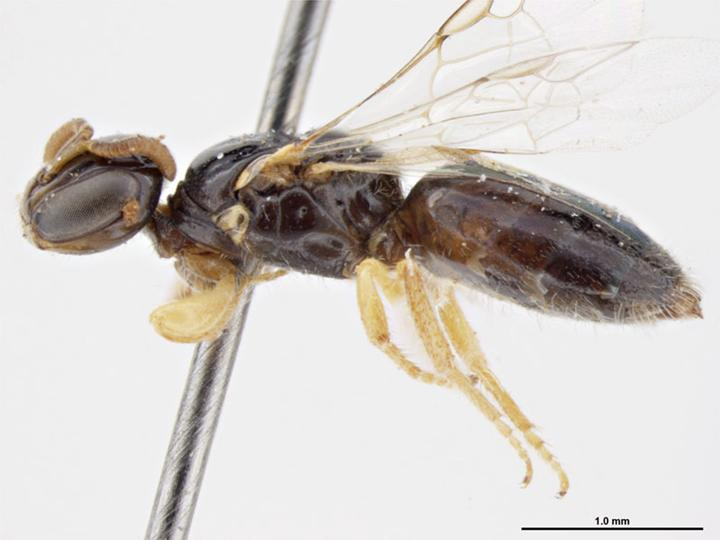
- Female

Scientific classification
- Kingdom: Animalia
- Phylum: Arthropoda
- Clade: Pancrustacea
- Class: Insecta
- Order: Hymenoptera
- Family: Colletidae
- Genus: Xanthesma
- Species: X. euxesta

Binomial name
- Xanthesma euxesta (Exley, 1969)

Synonyms
- Argohesma euxesta Exley, 1969

= Xanthesma euxesta =

Species of bee

Xanthesma euxesta, or Xanthesma (Argohesma) euxesta, is a species of bee in the family Colletidae and the subfamily Euryglossinae. It is endemic to Australia. It was described in 1969 by Australian entomologist Elizabeth Exley.

== Distribution and habitat ==
The species occurs in northern Western Australia. The type locality is the Kimberley Research Station, Wyndham.

== Behaviour ==
The adults are flying mellivores.
