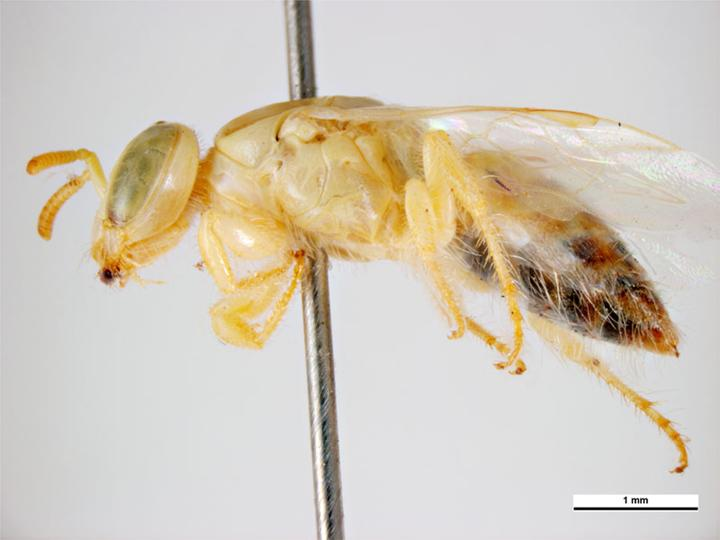
- Female

Scientific classification
- Kingdom: Animalia
- Phylum: Arthropoda
- Clade: Pancrustacea
- Class: Insecta
- Order: Hymenoptera
- Family: Colletidae
- Genus: Xanthesma
- Species: X. flava

Binomial name
- Xanthesma flava Michener, 1965

= Xanthesma flava =

Species of bee

Xanthesma flava, or Xanthesma (Xanthesma) flava, is a species of bee in the family Colletidae and the subfamily Euryglossinae. It is endemic to Australia. It was described in 1965 by American entomologist Charles Duncan Michener.

== Distribution and habitat ==
The species occurs in Western Australia, the Northern Territory and Queensland. The type locality is Turn-off Lagoons, on the Nicholson River, in the Gulf Country of north-west Queensland.

== Behaviour ==
The adults are flying mellivores. Flowering plants visited by the bees include Eucalyptus species.
