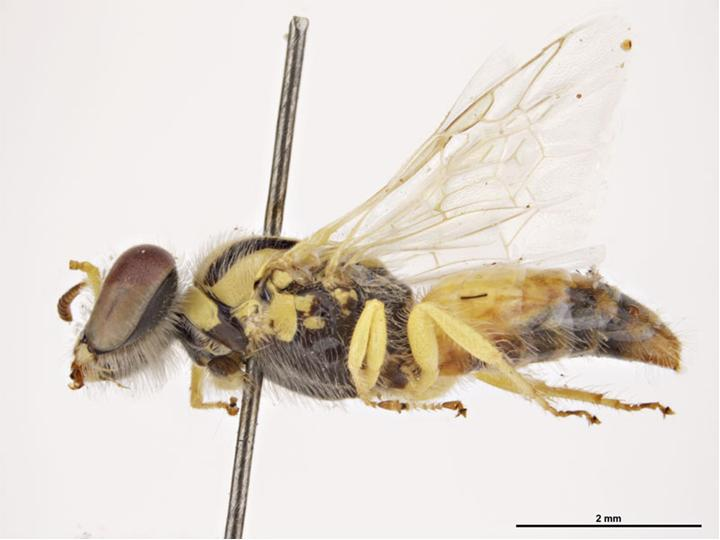
- Male

Scientific classification
- Kingdom: Animalia
- Phylum: Arthropoda
- Clade: Pancrustacea
- Class: Insecta
- Order: Hymenoptera
- Family: Colletidae
- Genus: Xanthesma
- Species: X. lasiosomata

Binomial name
- Xanthesma lasiosomata Exley, 1969

= Xanthesma lasiosomata =

Species of bee

Xanthesma lasiosomata, or Xanthesma (Xanthesma) lasiosomata, is a species of bee in the family Colletidae and the subfamily Euryglossinae. It is endemic to Australia. It was described in 1969 by Australian entomologist Elizabeth Exley.

== Distribution and habitat ==
The species occurs in the Northern Territory. The type locality is 37 km north of Renner Springs, on the Barkly Tableland.

== Behaviour ==
The adults are flying mellivores.
