= Xanthesma parva =

Scientific classification
- Kingdom: Animalia
- Phylum: Arthropoda
- Clade: Pancrustacea
- Class: Insecta
- Order: Hymenoptera
- Family: Colletidae
- Genus: Xanthesma
- Species: X. parva

Binomial name
- Xanthesma parva Exley, 1969

Species of bee

Xanthesma parva, or Xanthesma (Xanthesma) parva, is a species of bee in the family Colletidae and the subfamily Euryglossinae. It is endemic to Australia. It was described in 1969 by Australian entomologist Elizabeth Exley.

== Distribution and habitat ==
The species occurs in the Wheatbelt region of south-west Western Australia. The type locality is Kukerin.

== Behaviour ==
The adults are flying mellivores.
