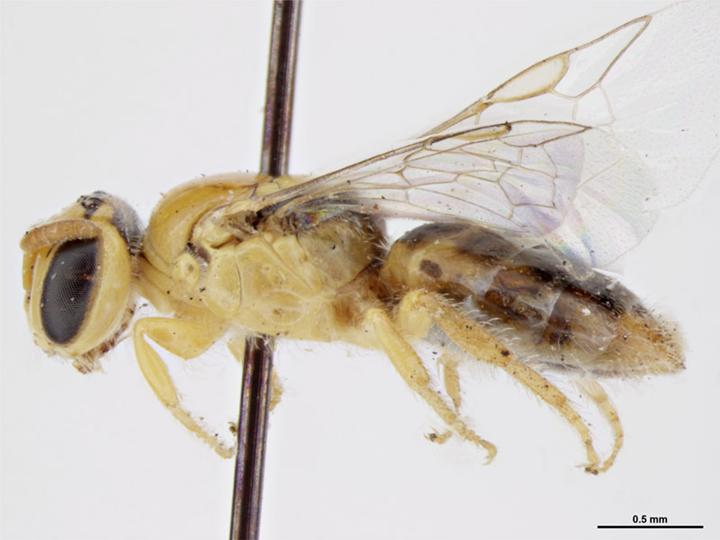
- Female

Scientific classification
- Kingdom: Animalia
- Phylum: Arthropoda
- Clade: Pancrustacea
- Class: Insecta
- Order: Hymenoptera
- Family: Colletidae
- Genus: Xanthesma
- Species: X. nukarnensis

Binomial name
- Xanthesma nukarnensis (Exley, 1974)

Synonyms
- Argohesma nukarnensis Exley, 1974

= Xanthesma nukarnensis =

Species of bee

Xanthesma nukarnensis, or Xanthesma (Argohesma) nukarnensis, is a species of bee in the family Colletidae and the subfamily Euryglossinae. It is endemic to Australia. It was described in 1974 by Australian entomologist Elizabeth Exley.

== Distribution and habitat ==
The species occurs in southern inland Western Australia. The type locality is 16 km south of Coolgardie. Other published localities include Kalgoorlie, Nukarni, Merredin and Southern Cross.

== Behaviour ==
The adults are flying mellivores. Flowering plants visited by the bees include Eucalyptus species.

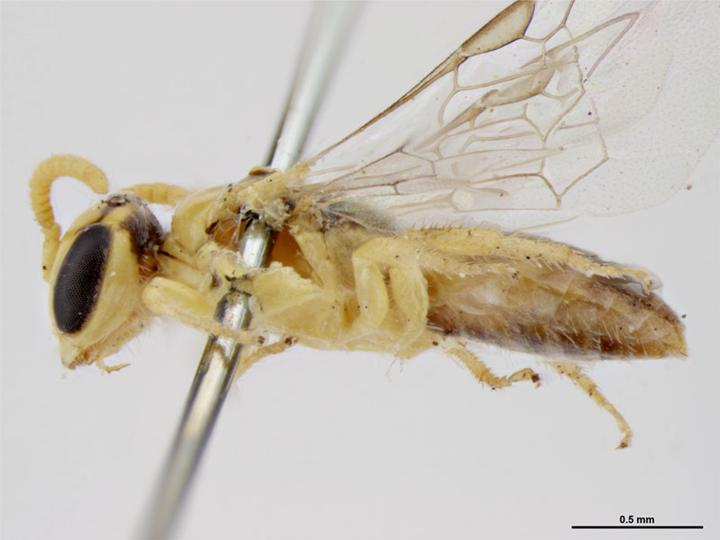
Male
