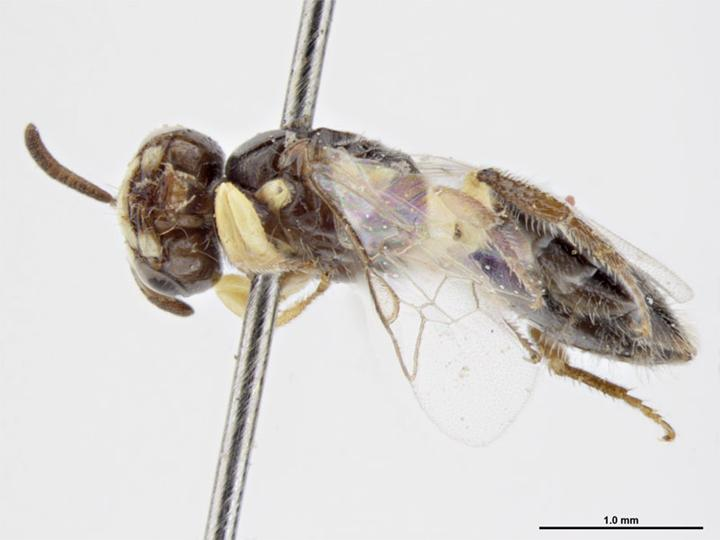
- Female

Scientific classification
- Kingdom: Animalia
- Phylum: Arthropoda
- Clade: Pancrustacea
- Class: Insecta
- Order: Hymenoptera
- Family: Colletidae
- Genus: Xanthesma
- Species: X. deloschema

Binomial name
- Xanthesma deloschema (Exley, 1969)

Synonyms
- Argohesma deloschema Exley, 1969

= Xanthesma deloschema =

Species of bee

Xanthesma deloschema, or Xanthesma (Argohesma) deloschema, is a species of bee in the family Colletidae and the subfamily Euryglossinae. It is endemic to Australia. It was described in 1969 by Australian entomologist Elizabeth Exley.

== Distribution and habitat ==
The species occurs in eastern Australia. The type locality is Oxenford in south-east Queensland. Other published localities include Mount Yule and Healesville in the Yarra Ranges of Victoria.

== Behaviour ==
The adults are flying mellivores. Flowering plants visited by the bees include Eucalyptus species.
