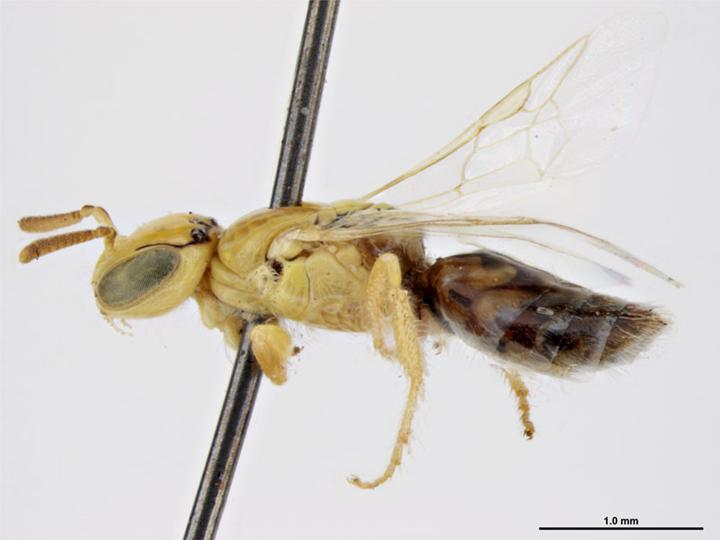
- Xanthesma clara (female)

Scientific classification
- Kingdom: Animalia
- Phylum: Arthropoda
- Clade: Pancrustacea
- Class: Insecta
- Order: Hymenoptera
- Family: Colletidae
- Subfamily: Euryglossinae
- Genus: Xanthesma; Michener, 1965

= Xanthesma =

Genus of bees

Xanthesma is a genus of Australian bees in the family Colletidae and the subfamily Euryglossinae. It was first described in 1965 by Charles Duncan Michener, and subsequently revised by Elizabeth Exley. It contains the following subgenera:

- Xanthesma (Argohesma) (Exley, 1969)
- Xanthesma (Chaetohesma) Exley, 1978
- Xanthesma (Xanthesma) Michener, 1965
- Xanthesma (Xenohesma) Michener, 1965

== Species ==
The following list is of 47 valid names given at both IRMNG and at AFD:

- Xanthesma argosomata Exley, 1969
- Xanthesma baringa (Exley, 1978)
- Xanthesma blanda (Smith, 1879)
- Xanthesma brachycera (Cockerell, 1914)
- Xanthesma chrysea (Exley, 1969)
- Xanthesma clara (Exley, 1974)
- Xanthesma clethrosema (Exley, 1969)
- Xanthesma clypearis (Michener, 1965)
- Xanthesma dasycephala Exley, 1969
- Xanthesma deloschema (Exley, 1969)
- Xanthesma eremica (Exley, 1969)
- Xanthesma euxesta (Exley, 1969)
- Xanthesma evansi (Michener, 1965)
- Xanthesma fasciata (Exley, 1969)
- Xanthesma federalis (Michener, 1965)
- Xanthesma flava Michener, 1965
- Xanthesma flavicauda (Michener, 1965)
- Xanthesma foveolata (Exley, 1978)
- Xanthesma furcifera (Cockerell, 1913)
- Xanthesma hirsutoscapa (Exley, 1969)
- Xanthesma infuscata (Exley, 1978)
- Xanthesma isae (Exley, 1978)
- Xanthesma lasiosomata Exley, 1969
- Xanthesma levis (Exley, 1978)
- Xanthesma lucida (Exley, 1974)
- Xanthesma lukinsiana (Exley, 1969)
- Xanthesma lutea Exley, 1969
- Xanthesma maculata (Smith, 1879)
- Xanthesma megacephala (Exley, 1974)
- Xanthesma megastigma (Exley, 1978)
- Xanthesma melanoclypearis (Exley, 1969)
- Xanthesma merredensis Exley, 1974
- Xanthesma micheneri Exley, 1978
- Xanthesma newmanensis (Exley, 1978)
- Xanthesma nigrior Michener, 1965
- Xanthesma nukarnensis (Exley, 1974)
- Xanthesma parva Exley, 1969
- Xanthesma primaria (Michener, 1965)
- Xanthesma robusta (Exley, 1978)
- Xanthesma scutellaris (Michener, 1965)
- Xanthesma sigaloessa (Exley, 1969)
- Xanthesma stagei (Exley, 1969)
- Xanthesma striolata (Exley, 1978)
- Xanthesma trisulca Exley, 1969
- Xanthesma tuberculata (Exley, 1978)
- Xanthesma villosula (Smith, 1879)
- Xanthesma vittata Exley, 1969
