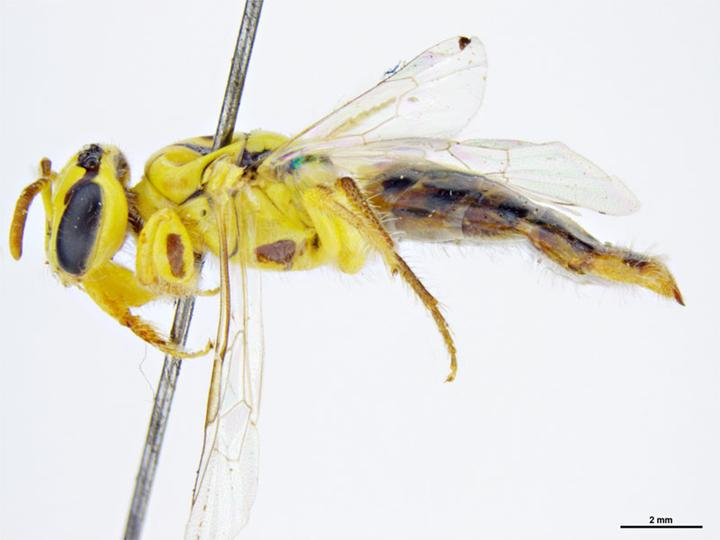
- Female

Scientific classification
- Kingdom: Animalia
- Phylum: Arthropoda
- Clade: Pancrustacea
- Class: Insecta
- Order: Hymenoptera
- Family: Colletidae
- Genus: Xanthesma
- Species: X. striolata

Binomial name
- Xanthesma striolata (Exley, 1978)

Synonyms
- Chaetohesma striolata Exley, 1978

= Xanthesma striolata =

Species of bee

Xanthesma striolata, or Xanthesma (Chaetohesma) striolata, is a species of bee in the family Colletidae and the subfamily Euryglossinae. It is endemic to Australia. It was described in 1978 by Australian entomologist Elizabeth Exley.

== Distribution and habitat ==
The species occurs across tropical northern Australia. The type locality is 16 km west of Mount Carbine in Far North Queensland.

== Behaviour ==
The adults are flying mellivores. Flowering plants visited by the bees include Eucalyptus species.

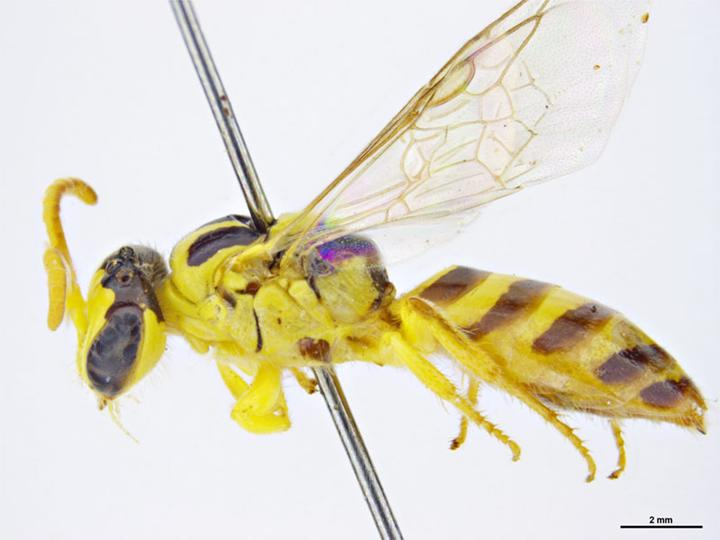
Male
