= Xanthesma clethrosema =

Scientific classification
- Kingdom: Animalia
- Phylum: Arthropoda
- Clade: Pancrustacea
- Class: Insecta
- Order: Hymenoptera
- Family: Colletidae
- Genus: Xanthesma
- Species: X. clethrosema

Binomial name
- Xanthesma clethrosema (Exley, 1969)

Synonyms
- Euryglossa (Xenohesma) clethrosema Exley, 1969

Species of bee

Xanthesma clethrosema , or Xanthesma (Xenohesma) clethrosema , is a species of bee in the family Colletidae and the subfamily Euryglossinae. It is endemic to Australia. It was described in 1969 by Australian entomologist Elizabeth Exley.

== Distribution and habitat ==
The species occurs in central Australia. The type locality is 22 km north of Barrow Creek in the southern part of the Northern Territory.

== Behaviour ==
The adults are flying mellivores. Flowering plants visited by the bees include Eucalyptus species.
