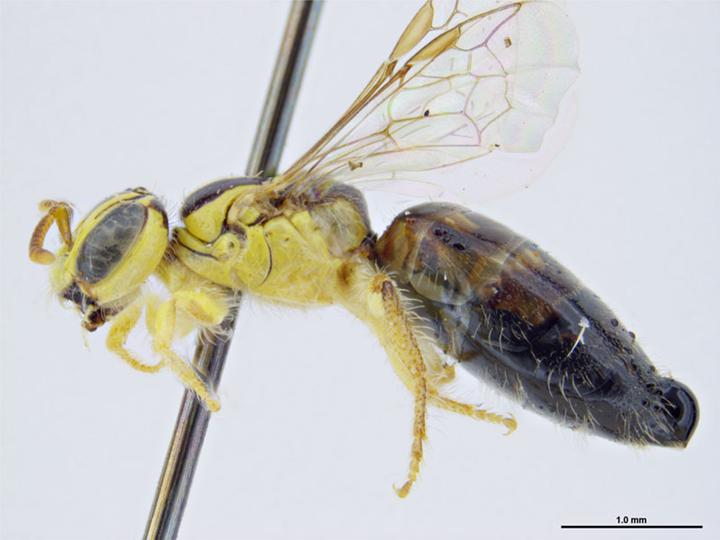
- Female

Scientific classification
- Kingdom: Animalia
- Phylum: Arthropoda
- Clade: Pancrustacea
- Class: Insecta
- Order: Hymenoptera
- Family: Colletidae
- Genus: Xanthesma
- Species: X. merredensis

Binomial name
- Xanthesma merredensis Exley, 1974

= Xanthesma merredensis =

Species of bee

Xanthesma merredensis, or Xanthesma (Xanthesma) merredensis, is a species of bee in the family Colletidae and the subfamily Euryglossinae. It is endemic to Australia. It was described in 1974 by Australian entomologist Elizabeth Exley.

== Distribution and habitat ==
The species occurs in Western Australia. The type locality is 54 km east of Merredin. It has also been recorded from Dongara.

== Behaviour ==
The adults are flying mellivores. Flowering plants visited by the bees include Eucalyptus species.

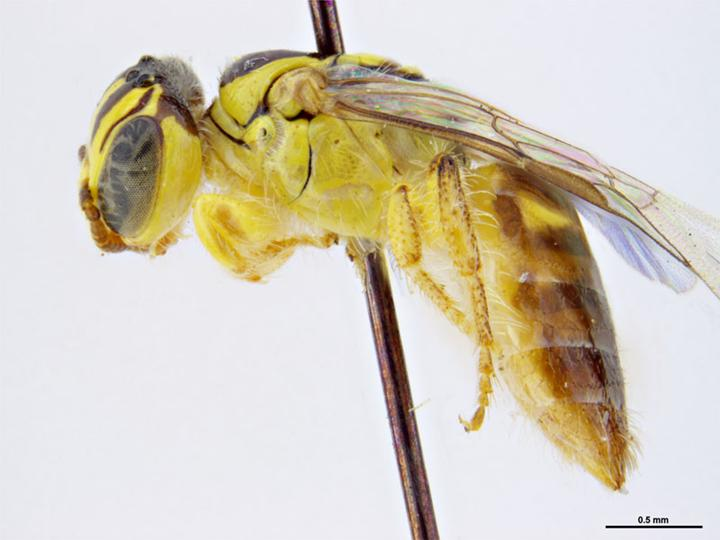
Male
