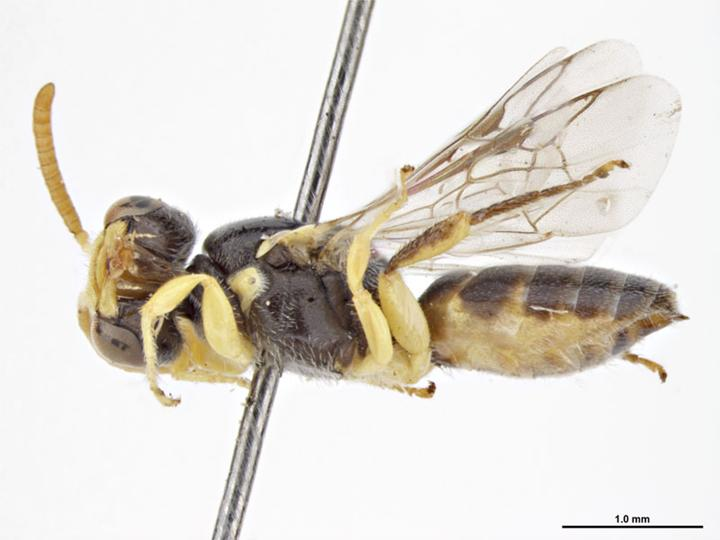
- Male

Scientific classification
- Kingdom: Animalia
- Phylum: Arthropoda
- Clade: Pancrustacea
- Class: Insecta
- Order: Hymenoptera
- Family: Colletidae
- Genus: Xanthesma
- Species: X. robusta

Binomial name
- Xanthesma robusta (Exley, 1978)

Synonyms
- Chaetohesma robusta Exley, 1978

= Xanthesma robusta =

Species of bee

Xanthesma robusta, or Xanthesma (Chaetohesma) robusta, is a species of bee in the family Colletidae and the subfamily Euryglossinae. It is endemic to Australia. It was described in 1978 by Australian entomologist Elizabeth Exley.

== Distribution and habitat ==
The species occurs in inland Far North Queensland. The type locality is 15 km east of Forsayth. Other published localities are Georgetown and Mount Surprise.

== Behaviour ==
The adults are flying mellivores. Flowering plants visited by the bees include Eucalyptus species.
