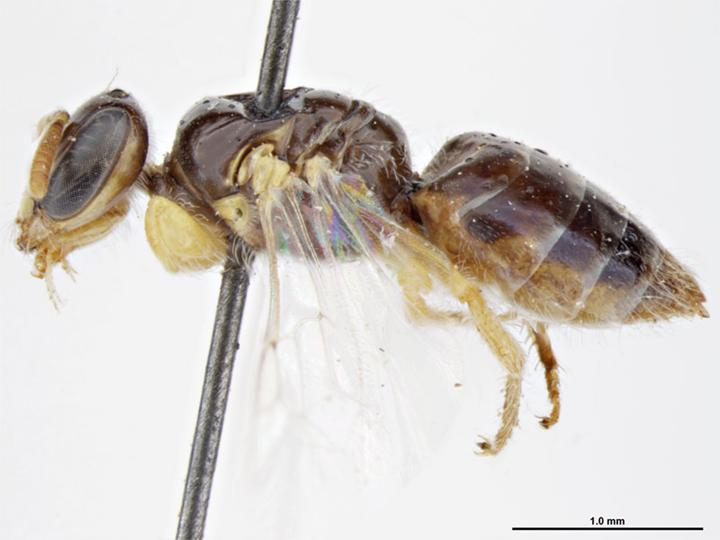
- Female

Scientific classification
- Kingdom: Animalia
- Phylum: Arthropoda
- Clade: Pancrustacea
- Class: Insecta
- Order: Hymenoptera
- Family: Colletidae
- Genus: Xanthesma
- Species: X. eremica

Binomial name
- Xanthesma eremica (Exley, 1969)

Synonyms
- Argohesma eremica Exley, 1969

= Xanthesma eremica =

Species of bee

Xanthesma eremica, or Xanthesma (Argohesma) eremica, is a species of bee in the family Colletidae and the subfamily Euryglossinae. It is endemic to Australia. It was described in 1969 by Australian entomologist Elizabeth Exley.

== Distribution and habitat ==
The species occurs in inland Australia. The type locality is MacDonald Downs Station, north-east of Alice Springs in the Northern Territory. Other published localities include Mica Creek near Mount Isa in north-west Queensland, Markaranka and Morgan in South Australia, and Gunbower in Victoria.

== Behaviour ==
The adults are flying mellivores. Flowering plants visited by the bees include Eucalyptus species.
