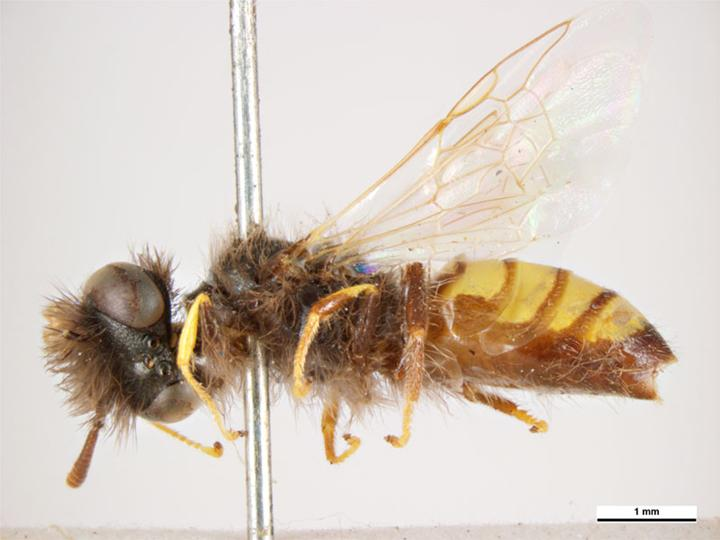
- Male

Scientific classification
- Kingdom: Animalia
- Phylum: Arthropoda
- Clade: Pancrustacea
- Class: Insecta
- Order: Hymenoptera
- Family: Colletidae
- Genus: Xanthesma
- Species: X. primaria

Binomial name
- Xanthesma primaria Michener, 1965

= Xanthesma primaria =

Species of bee

Xanthesma primaria, or Xanthesma (Xenohesma) primaria, is a species of bee in the family Colletidae and the subfamily Euryglossinae. It is endemic to Australia. It was described in 1965 by American entomologist Charles Duncan Michener.

== Distribution and habitat ==
The species occurs in south-west Western Australia. The type locality is 48 km north of Bunbury.

== Behaviour ==
The adults are flying mellivores.
