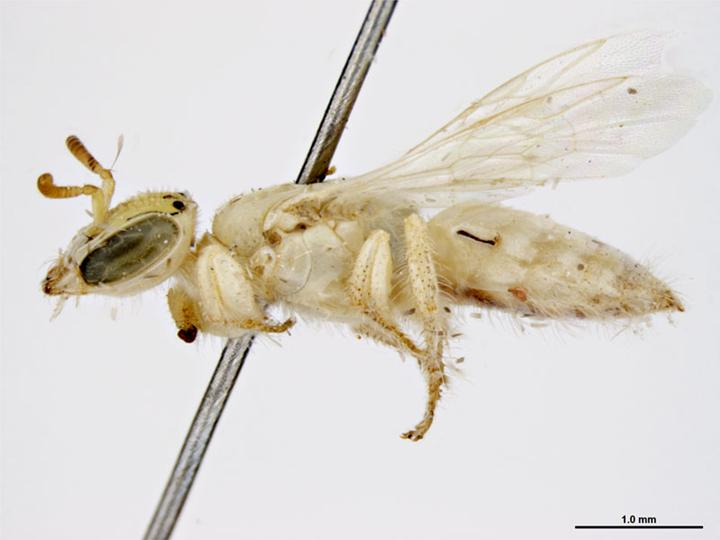
- Female

Scientific classification
- Kingdom: Animalia
- Phylum: Arthropoda
- Clade: Pancrustacea
- Class: Insecta
- Order: Hymenoptera
- Family: Colletidae
- Genus: Xanthesma
- Species: X. dasycephala

Binomial name
- Xanthesma dasycephala Exley, 1969

= Xanthesma dasycephala =

Species of bee

Xanthesma dasycephala, or Xanthesma (Xanthesma) dasycephala, is a species of bee in the family Colletidae and the subfamily Euryglossinae. It is endemic to Australia. It was described in 1969 by Australian entomologist Elizabeth Exley.

== Distribution and habitat ==
The species occurs in the south of the Northern Territory. The type locality is 22 km north of Barrow Creek.

== Behaviour ==
The adults are flying mellivores. Flowering plants visited by the bees include Eucalyptus species.

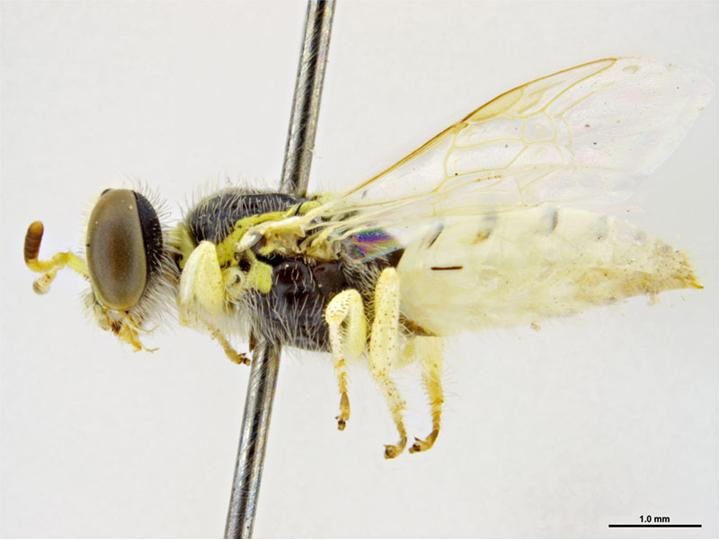
Male
