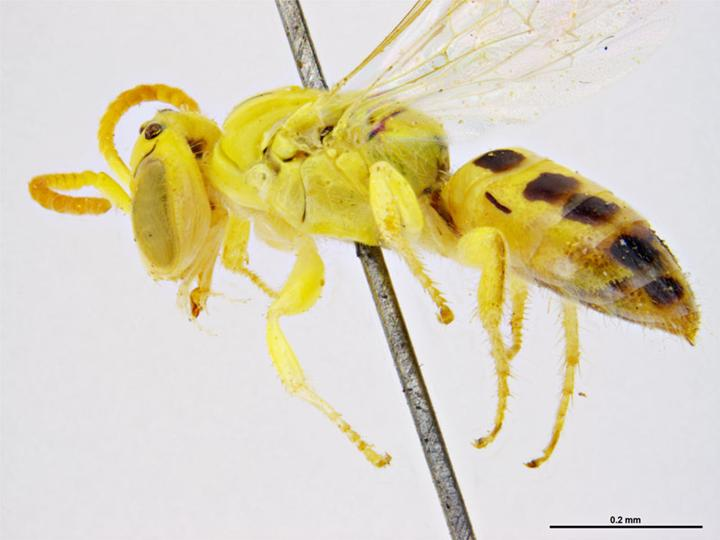
- Male

Scientific classification
- Kingdom: Animalia
- Phylum: Arthropoda
- Clade: Pancrustacea
- Class: Insecta
- Order: Hymenoptera
- Family: Colletidae
- Genus: Xanthesma
- Species: X. baringa

Binomial name
- Xanthesma baringa (Exley, 1978)

Synonyms
- Chaetohesma baringa Exley, 1978

= Xanthesma baringa =

Species of bee

Xanthesma baringa, or Xanthesma (Chaetohesma) baringa, is a species of bee in the family Colletidae and the subfamily Euryglossinae. It is endemic to Australia. It was described in 1978 by Australian entomologist Elizabeth Exley.

== Distribution and habitat ==
The species occurs in the Northern Territory. The type locality is Barrow Creek.

== Behaviour ==
The adults are flying mellivores. Flowering plants visited by the bees include Eucalyptus species.
