= Xanthesma blanda =

Scientific classification
- Kingdom: Animalia
- Phylum: Arthropoda
- Clade: Pancrustacea
- Class: Insecta
- Order: Hymenoptera
- Family: Colletidae
- Genus: Xanthesma
- Species: X. blanda

Binomial name
- Xanthesma blanda (Smith, 1879)

Synonyms
- Euryglossa blanda Smith, 1879

Species of bee

Xanthesma blanda, or Xanthesma (Xenohesma) blanda, is a species of bee in the family Colletidae and the subfamily Euryglossinae. It is endemic to Australia. It was described in 1879 by English entomologist Frederick Smith.

== Distribution and habitat ==
The type locality was given simply as Western Australia without further specification.

== Behaviour ==
The adults are flying mellivores.
