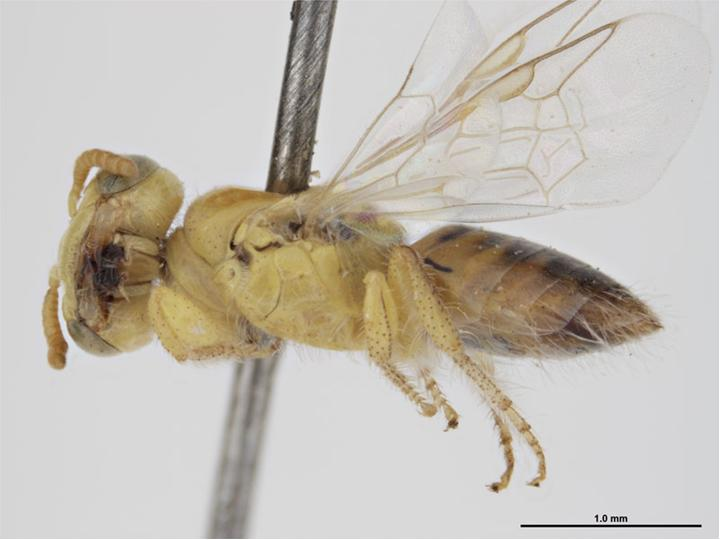
- Female

Scientific classification
- Kingdom: Animalia
- Phylum: Arthropoda
- Clade: Pancrustacea
- Class: Insecta
- Order: Hymenoptera
- Family: Colletidae
- Genus: Xanthesma
- Species: X. micheneri

Binomial name
- Xanthesma micheneri Exley, 1978

= Xanthesma micheneri =

Species of bee

Xanthesma micheneri, or Xanthesma (Xanthesma) micheneri, is a species of bee in the family Colletidae and the subfamily Euryglossinae. It is endemic to Australia. It was described in 1978 by Australian entomologist Elizabeth Exley.

== Distribution and habitat ==
The species occurs in the Gascoyne region of Western Australia. The type locality is 7 km north of Wannoo, via Carnarvon. It has also been recorded north of the Murchison River.

== Behaviour ==
The adults are flying mellivores. Flowering plants visited by the bees include Eucalyptus species.
