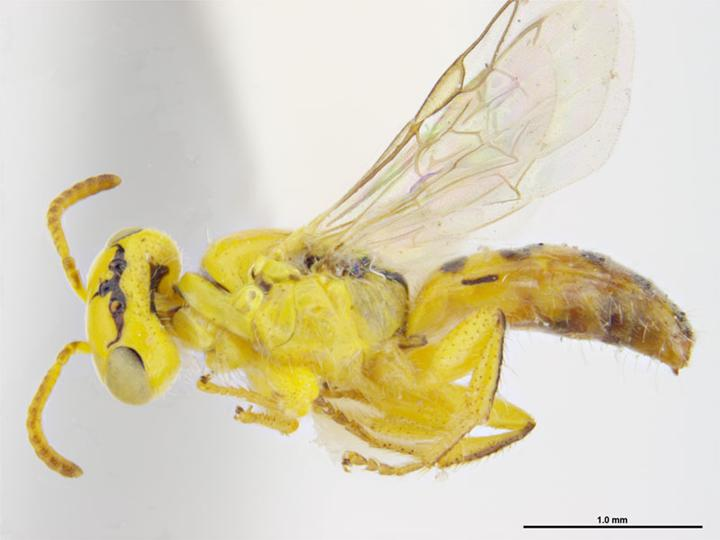
- Male

Scientific classification
- Kingdom: Animalia
- Phylum: Arthropoda
- Clade: Pancrustacea
- Class: Insecta
- Order: Hymenoptera
- Family: Colletidae
- Genus: Xanthesma
- Species: X. furcifera

Binomial name
- Xanthesma furcifera (Cockerell, 1913)

Synonyms
- Euryglossa furcifera Cockerell, 1913

= Xanthesma furcifera =

Species of bee

Xanthesma furcifera, or Xanthesma (Xanthesma) furcifera, is a species of bee in the family Colletidae and the subfamily Euryglossinae. It is endemic to Australia. It was described in 1913 by British-American entomologist Theodore Dru Alison Cockerell.

== Distribution and habitat ==
The species occurs in south-eastern Australia. The type locality is Purnong, on the Murray River in South Australia.

== Behaviour ==
The adults are flying mellivores with sedentary larvae. They nest in soil in aggregatons. Flowering plants visited by the bees include Eucalyptus species.

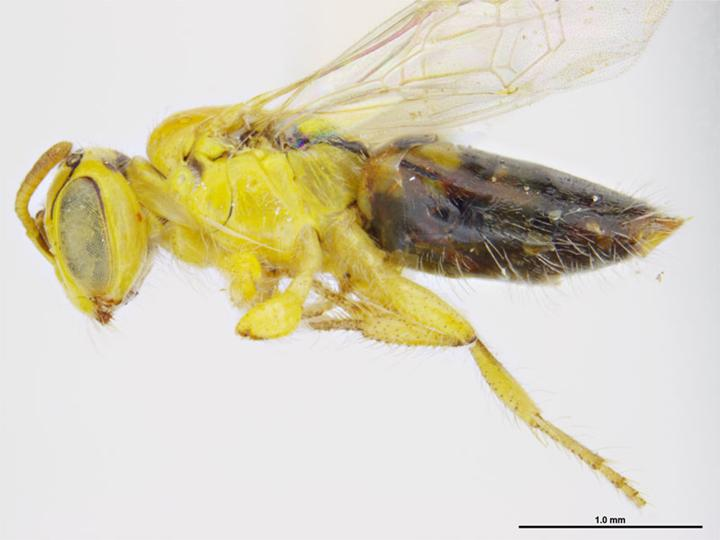
Female
