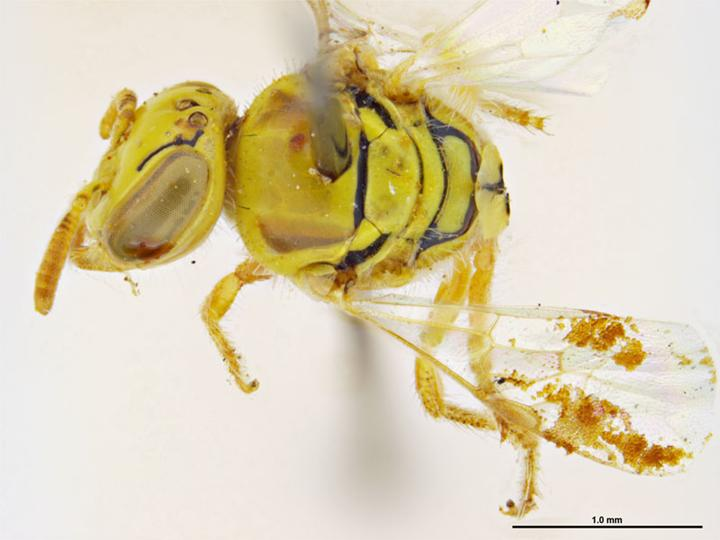
- Female: head and thorax

Scientific classification
- Kingdom: Animalia
- Phylum: Arthropoda
- Clade: Pancrustacea
- Class: Insecta
- Order: Hymenoptera
- Family: Colletidae
- Genus: Xanthesma
- Species: X. brachycera

Binomial name
- Xanthesma brachycera (Cockerell, 1914)

Synonyms
- Euryglossa perpulchra Cockerell, 1916

= Xanthesma brachycera =

Species of bee

Xanthesma brachycera, or Xanthesma (Xenohesma) brachycera, is a species of bee in the family Colletidae and the subfamily Euryglossinae. It is endemic to Australia. It was described in 1914 by British-American entomologist Theodore Dru Alison Cockerell.

== Distribution and habitat ==
The species occurs across mainland Australia. Type localities are Townsville in North Queensland and Kalamunda in Western Australia.

== Behaviour ==
The adults are flying mellivores. Flowering plants visited by the bees include Eucalyptus species.

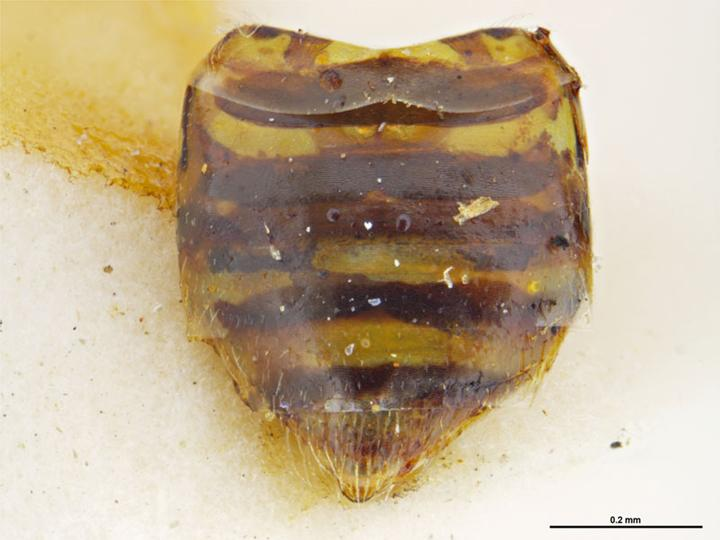
Female: abdomen
