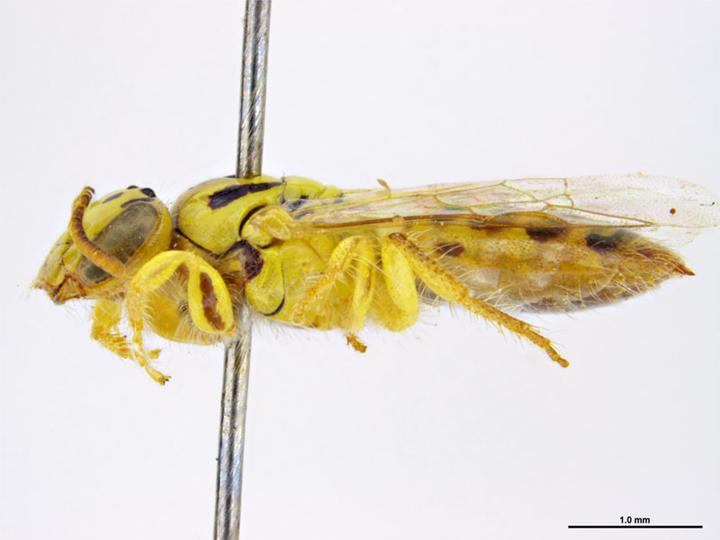
- Female

Scientific classification
- Kingdom: Animalia
- Phylum: Arthropoda
- Clade: Pancrustacea
- Class: Insecta
- Order: Hymenoptera
- Family: Colletidae
- Genus: Xanthesma
- Species: X. levis

Binomial name
- Xanthesma levis (Exley, 1978)

Synonyms
- Chaetohesma levis Exley, 1978

= Xanthesma levis =

Species of bee

Xanthesma levis, or Xanthesma (Chaetohesma) levis, is a species of bee in the family Colletidae and the subfamily Euryglossinae. It is endemic to Australia. It was described in 1978 by Australian entomologist Elizabeth Exley.

== Distribution and habitat ==
The species occurs in north-central Australia. The type locality is Barrow Creek in the southern part of the Northern Territory. It has also been recorded from Macdonald Downs Station, as well as from Mount Isa and Lake Moondarra in north-west Queensland.

== Behaviour ==
The adults are flying mellivores. Flowering plants visited by the bees include Eucalyptus species.

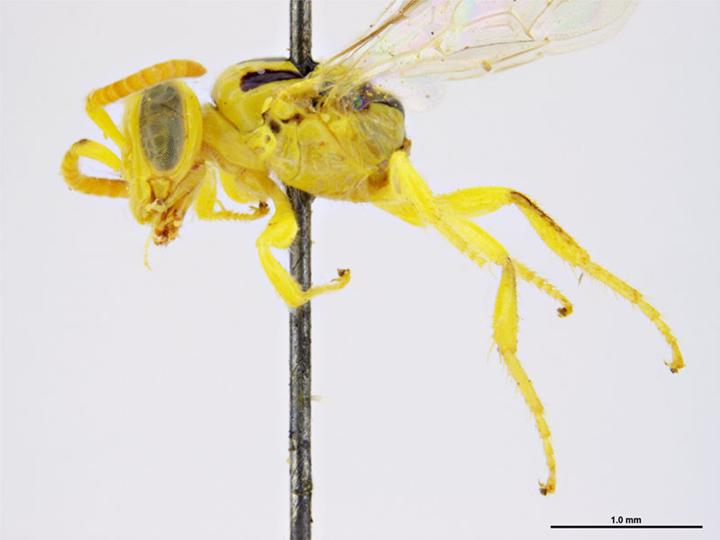
Male, abdomen missing
