= Totem Theatre =

Theatre in Alice Springs, Australia

Coordinates: 23°41′41″S 133°53′06″E

The Totem Theatre is a theatre located in Alice Springs in the Northern Territory of Australia. It is the home to the Alice Springs Theatre Group who manage the venue and produce amateur theatre productions. The Totem Theatre is a heritage listed building and the two main buildings are Sidney Williams Huts that were constructed in 1945 by the Australian Army in World War II. The buildings have been in use ever since.

== Background ==
The Totem Theatre was built in 1945 by the Australian Army during World War II, during this time the government was pouring military and civilian manpower into the Alice Springs region. Significant improvements were made both to the roads, primarily the Stuart Highway, and the Old Telegraph Line (allowing long distance telephone communication) as well as pumping water into people's homes for the first time. The Darwin Overland Maintenance Force were a big part of this push and they set up camp between ANZAC Oval and the Todd River and eventually, in 1945, built what became the Totem Theatre. These buildings were originally used as a Regimental Aid Post and Dental Clinic.

Following the end of the war military assets, including buildings, were inventoried and put up for disposal by the Commonwealth Disposals Commission. The Sidney Williams Huts were particularly popular and most were moved from their original sites and others remained and were adapted for residences and businesses; most of these have since been demolished. The Totem Theatre buildings remained in place and appear to have been mostly unused until the Alice Springs Theatre Group took over their lease in 1963 and launched their new "Totem Club House Theatre" in March 1964. To accommodate their current use both buildings have been subject to various alterations but retain most of their original elements.

It was listed on the Northern Territory Heritage Register on 18 January 2006.

Currently the Totem Theatre hosts an annual musical as well as plays, comedy nights, spoken word events and live music: it is also an important venue for the Alice Desert Festival.
