= Strehlow Research Centre =

Coordinates: 23°42′05″S 133°51′51″E

The Strehlow Research Centre is a museum and cultural centre within the Museum of Central Australia, which is situated in the Araluen Cultural Precinct in the town of Alice Springs in the Northern Territory of Australia.

== History ==
Established by the Government of the Northern Territory in 1991, the centre honours the career of linguist and anthropologist Ted Strehlow, who studied the Arrernte people and language, and whose legacy represents one of the world's most significant collections of material relating to indigenous ceremonial life.

== Description ==
The Strehlow Research Centre is responsible for the care of the Strehlow Collection of Aboriginal central Australian ethnographic objects and archival materials. It is managed by the Museum and Art Gallery of the Northern Territory.

Services provided by the Strehlow Research Centre include public display galleries within the [Araluen Cultural Precinct; maintaining the Strehlow Centre Library, which specialises in publications on central Australia in history and anthropology; providing traditional custodians and selected researchers access to the Strehlow collection of films, sound recordings, and archival materials; family history research on behalf of central Australian Aboriginal people, including members of Stolen Generations; and the storage of sacred objects on behalf of traditional custodians from central Australia.
