= Alice Springs Beanie Festival =

Festival in Northern Territory, Australia

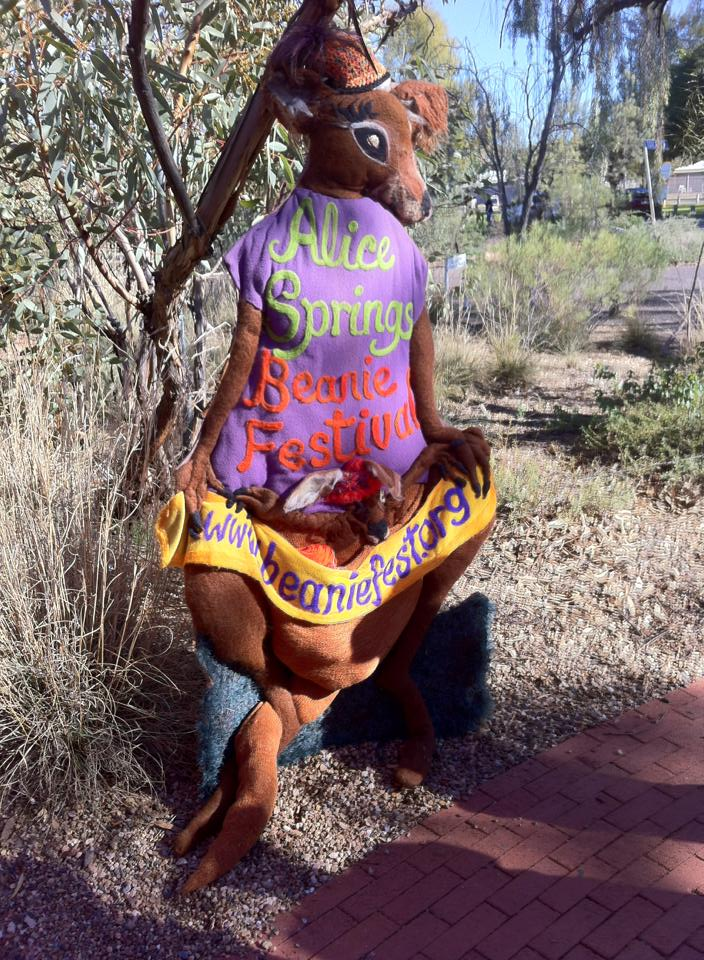
Alice Springs Beanie Festival, 2013

The Alice Springs Beanie Festival (also called simply the Beanie Festival) is an annual, community based, four-day festival celebrating beanies in all their forms.

The festival is held in June each year at the Araluen Cultural Precinct in Alice Springs.

== Overview ==
Parts of the festival include:

- Beanie Central; this is where beanies of all sorts, submitted from around the world, are sold to the public. Approximately 6,000 beanies are displayed this way each year.
- National Beanie Exhibition and Competition; beanies can also be submitted into the National Beanie Exhibition and Competition and, in order to be considered, they must be original pieces and artistically presented; there is also often a theme the beanie makers are asked to respond to. These beanies are then formally exhibited at the Araluen Art Centre and judged for a variety of awards. This exhibition remains in place for several weeks after the festival.
- Beanie Making Workshops; these are run in conjunction with Central Craft, a not for profit craft organisation, who run drop-in textile workshops alongside ladies from Pukatja who give demonstrations of hand spinning wool and the Tjanpi Desert Weavers who run basket weaving workshops.

The Beanie Festival attracts thousands of tourists to Alice Springs each year.

== History ==
The Beanie Festival was started in 1997, on a much smaller scale, with a 'beanie party' designed to create a unique social-enterprise and it was the idea of Adi Dunlop. The festival was inspired by the cold desert winters and existing popularity of beanies with Central Australian Aboriginal people who were already creating colourful and individual handmade creations. Beanies were often decorated with seeds, various fibres and other embellishments.

Beanies were also picked as a perfect social-enterprise as they are ideal for the tourist market, being light and inexpensive.

The 2020 festival, set for June, was cancelled due to the COVID-19 pandemic in Australia. The Festival was next held on 25-28 June 2021.
