= Alice Springs =

Town in the Northern Territory, Australia

Alice Springs Mparntwe
- Town
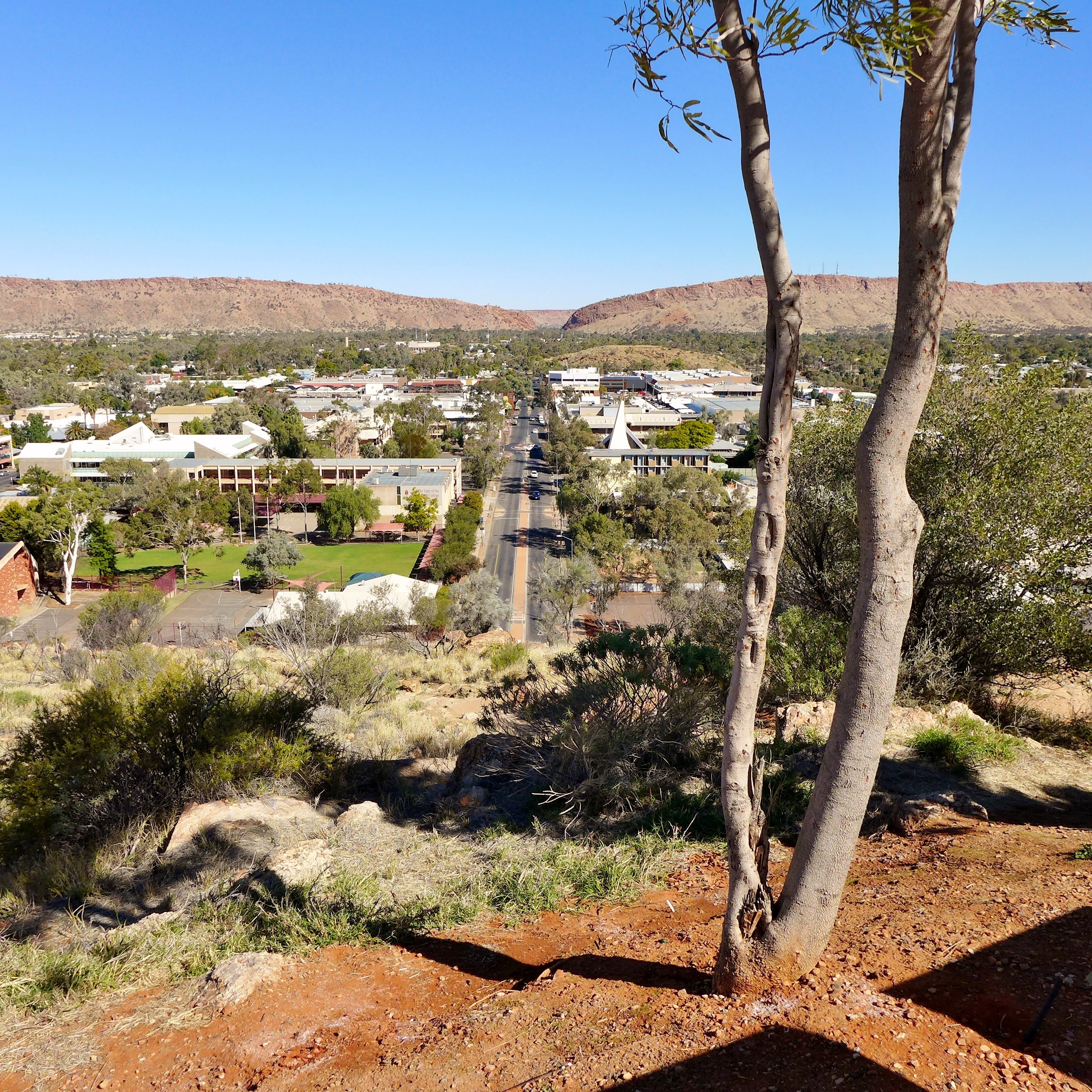
- View of Alice Springs from Anzac Hill, with MacDonnell Ranges and Heavitree Gap in the background

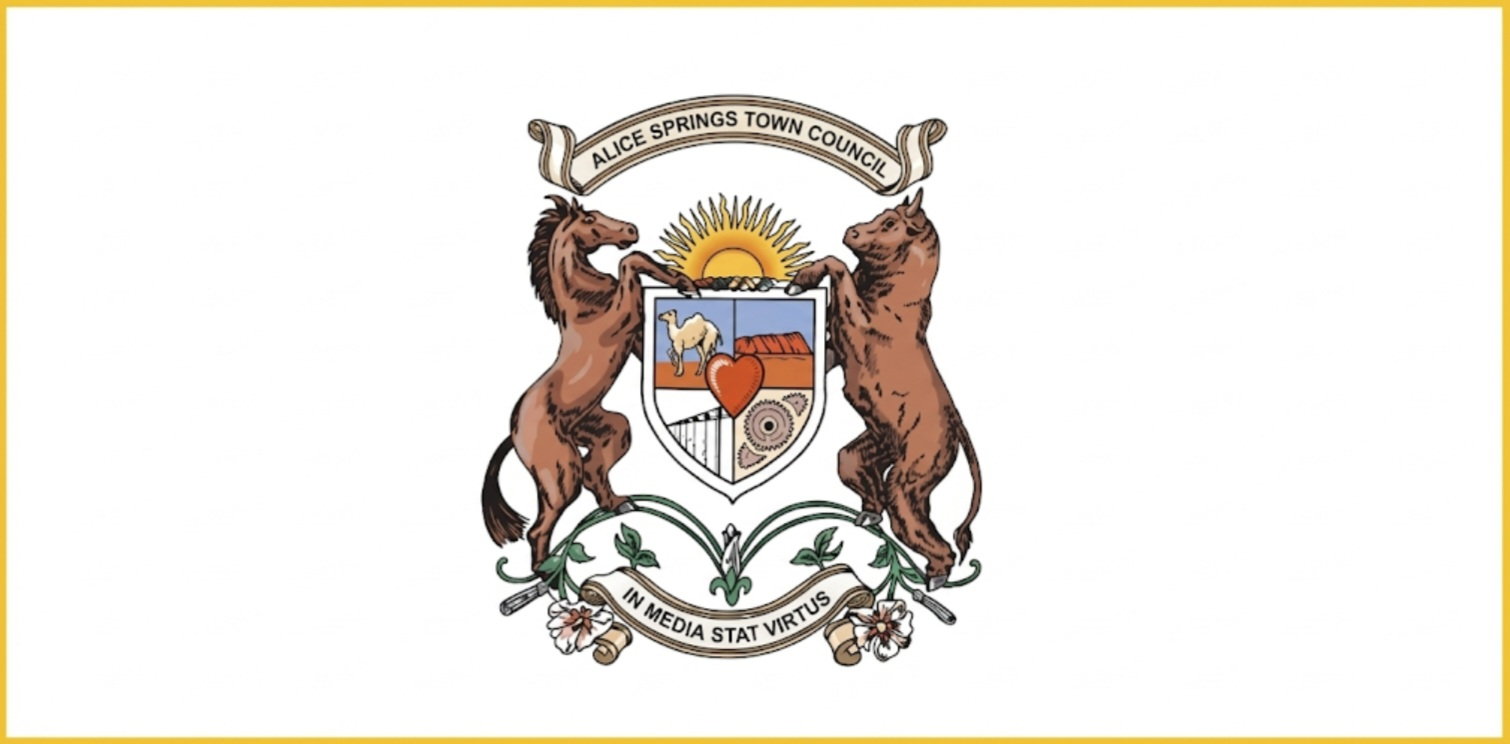
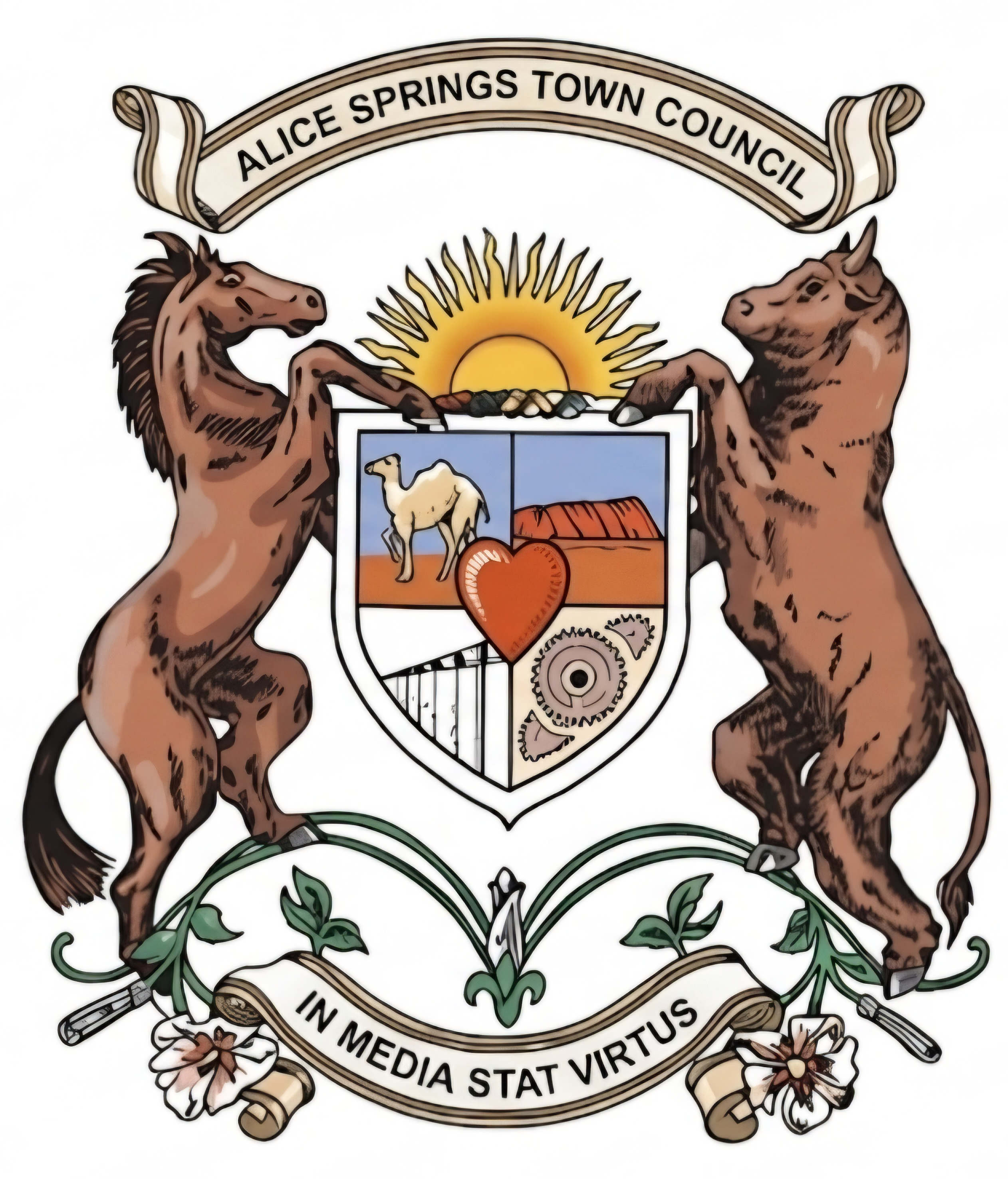
- Flag Seal

- Interactive map of Alice Springs
- Coordinates: 23°42′0″S 133°52′12″E
- Country: Australia
- State: Northern Territory
- LGA: Alice Springs Town Council
- Location: 1,499 km (931 mi) from Darwin; 1,532 km (952 mi) from Adelaide; 1,890 km (1,170 mi) from Melbourne; 1,990 km (1,240 mi) from Perth; 2,026 km (1,259 mi) from Sydney
- Established: 1872

Government
  - Mayor: Asta Hill
  - Territory electorates: Araluen; Braitling; Namatjira; Gwoja
  - Federal division: Lingiari

Area (2011 urban)
  - Total: 327.5 km^{2} (126.4 sq mi)
- Elevation: 545 m (1,788 ft)

Population
  - Total: 25,912 (2021)
  - Density: 79.121/km^{2} (204.92/sq mi)
- Time zone: UTC+9:30 (ACST)
- Postcode: 0870-0872
- Mean max temp: 28.8 °C (83.8 °F)
- Mean min temp: 13.2 °C (55.8 °F)
- Annual rainfall: 282.8 mm (11.13 in)

Alice Springs (Eastern Arrernte: Mparntwe, [ᵐbaⁿɖʷə], colloquially in English The Alice or Alice) is a town in the Northern Territory, Australia; it is the third-largest settlement in the Northern Territory after Darwin and Palmerston. The name Alice Springs was given by surveyor William Whitfield Mills after Alice, Lady Todd (née Alice Gillam Bell), wife of the telegraph pioneer Charles Todd. The town is situated roughly in Australia's geographic centre, nearly equidistant from Adelaide and Darwin.

The area's original inhabitants, the Arrernte, have lived in the Central Australian desert for tens of thousands of years.

Alice Springs had a population of 34,783 as of June 2025. The town's population accounts for approximately 10 percent of the population of the Northern Territory.

The town straddles the usually dry Todd River on the northern side of the MacDonnell Ranges. The surrounding region is known as Central Australia, or the Red Centre, an arid environment consisting of several deserts. Alice Springs experiences a wide temperature range, with an average maximum in summer of 35.6 °C (96.1 °F) and an average minimum in winter of 5.1 °C (41.2 °F).

== History ==
=== Traditional owners ===
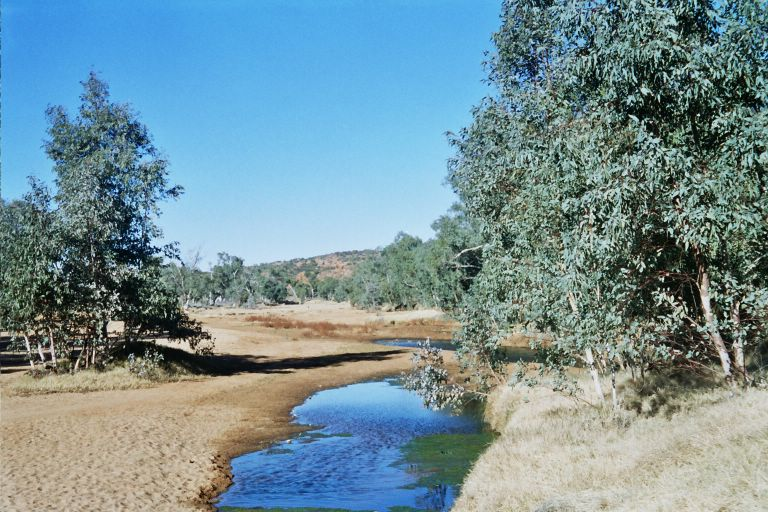
Todd River spring, the "springs" that give the town its name

The Arrernte people are the traditional owners of the Alice Springs area and surrounding MacDonnell Ranges. They have lived in the area for at least 30,000 years. The traditional name for the township area is Mparntwe ("watering place"), referencing Atherreyurre, a waterhole in the Todd River at Old Telegraph Station (known as Alice Springs). Mparntwe refers to the majority of the Alice Springs township, with two additional names: Irlpme covering the south and Antulye the east.

Arrernte has been spelt in various forms, including Aranda, Arrarnta, Arenta and Arunta. There are five dialects of the Arrernte language: South-eastern, Central, Northern, Eastern and North-eastern.

Arrernte country is rich with mountain ranges, waterholes and gorges, which create a variety of natural habitats. According to Arrernte traditional histories, the landscape was shaped by the Yeperenye, Ntyarlke, and Utnerrengatye caterpillars and Akngwelye or wild dogs.

Sites of traditional importance include Anthwerrke (Emily Gap), Akeyulerre (Billy Goat Hill), Ntaripe (Heavitree Gap), Atnelkentyarliweke (ANZAC Hill) and Alhekulyele (Mt Gillen).

=== European settlement ===
In 1861–62, John McDouall Stuart led an expedition through Central Australia to the west of what later became Alice Springs, thereby establishing a route from the south of the continent to the north.

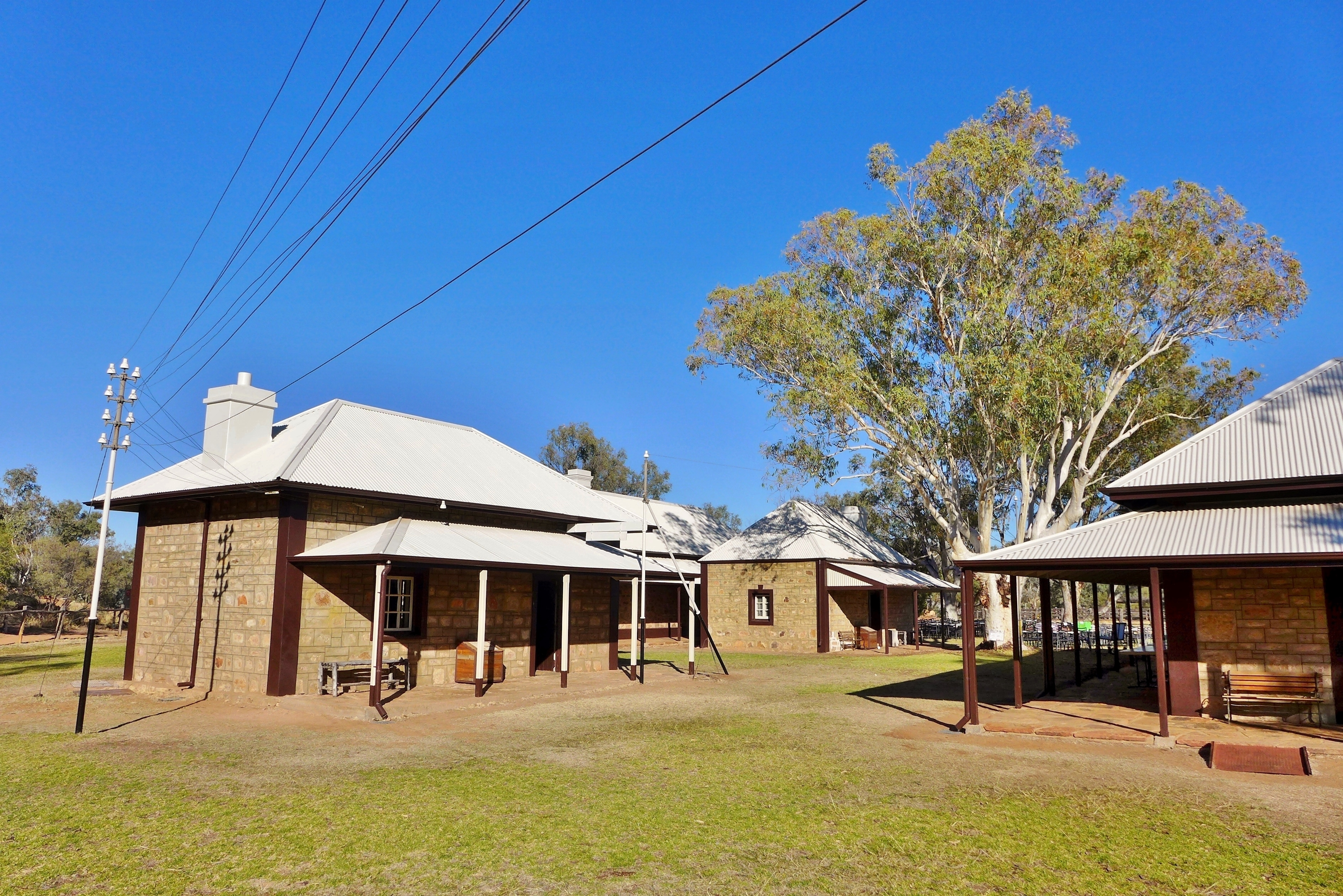
The original Alice Springs Telegraph Station was built in 1872 to relay messages between Darwin and Adelaide.

A settlement named after Stuart was necessitated ten years later with the construction of a repeater station on the Australian Overland Telegraph Line (OTL), which linked Adelaide to Darwin and Great Britain. The OTL was completed in 1872. It traced Stuart's route and opened up the interior for permanent settlement. The Alice Springs Telegraph Station was sited near what was thought to be a permanent waterhole in the normally dry Todd River, named Alice Springs by W.W. Mills after the wife of the Superintendent of Telegraphs and Postmaster General of South Australia, Sir Charles Todd, who was the driving force for constructing the OTL. The nearby settlement of Stuart was renamed Alice Springs on 31 August 1933. The Todd River and its tributary the Charles River, which meet near the telegraph station, were named after Sir Charles.

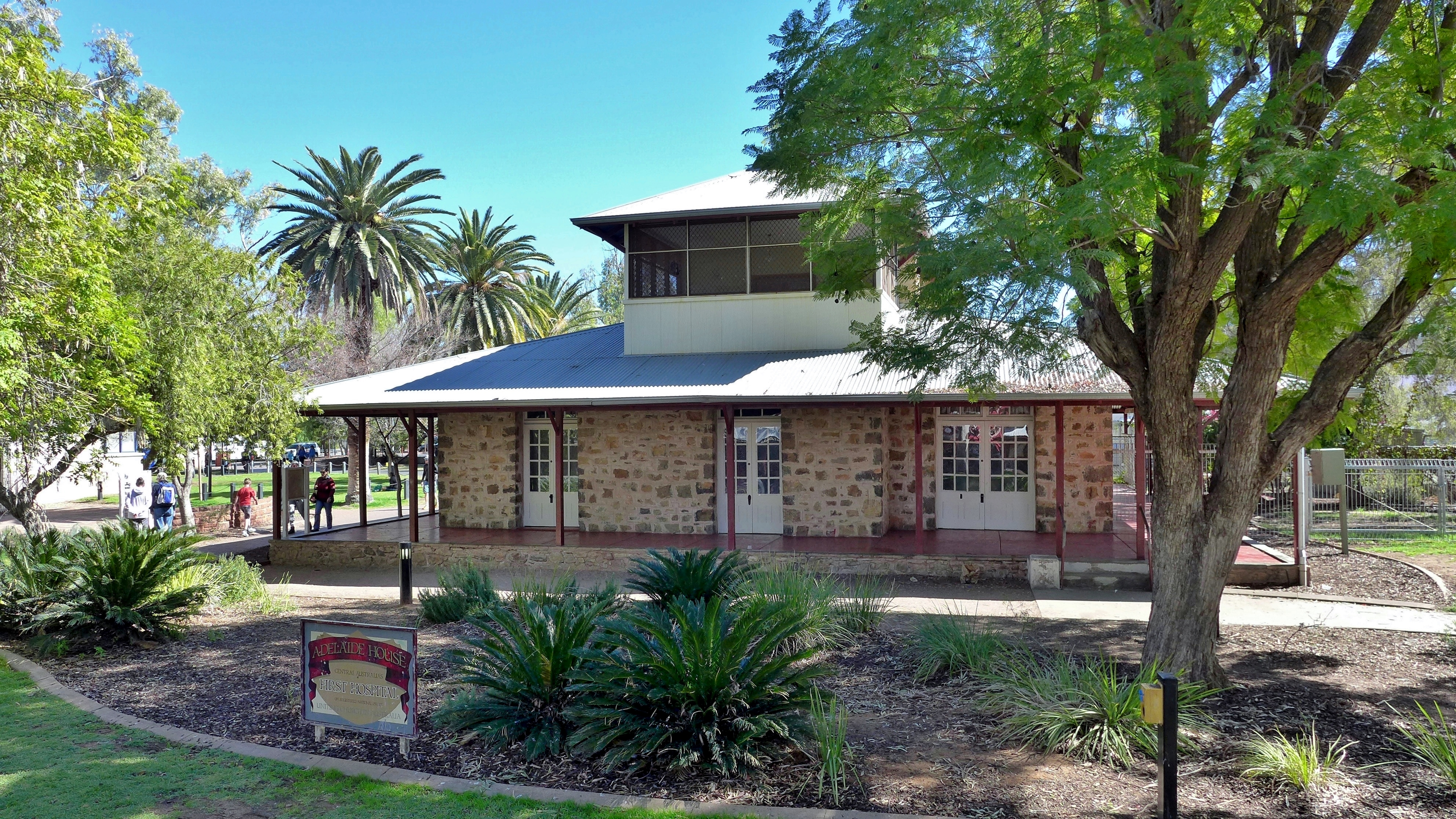
The historic Adelaide House, built 1926, the town's first hospital

It was not until alluvial gold was discovered at Arltunga, 100 kilometres (62 mi) east of the present Alice Springs, in 1887 that any significant European settlement occurred. The town's first substantial building was the Stuart Town Gaol (jail) in Parson's Street; this was built in 1909, when the town had a European population of fewer than 20 people. Many of the jail's first prisoners were first-contact Aboriginal men imprisoned for killing cattle. The first aircraft, piloted by Francis Stewart Briggs, landed in 1921. Central Australia's first hospital, Adelaide House, was built in 1926 when the European population of the town was about 40. It was not until 1929, when the train line to Alice was built, that the town's European population began to grow. Aboriginal Centralians outnumbered European Centralians until the mid-1930s. From 1926 to 1931, Alice Springs was the seat of government for the now-defunct Territory of Central Australia. Until 31 August 1933, the town was officially known as Stuart.

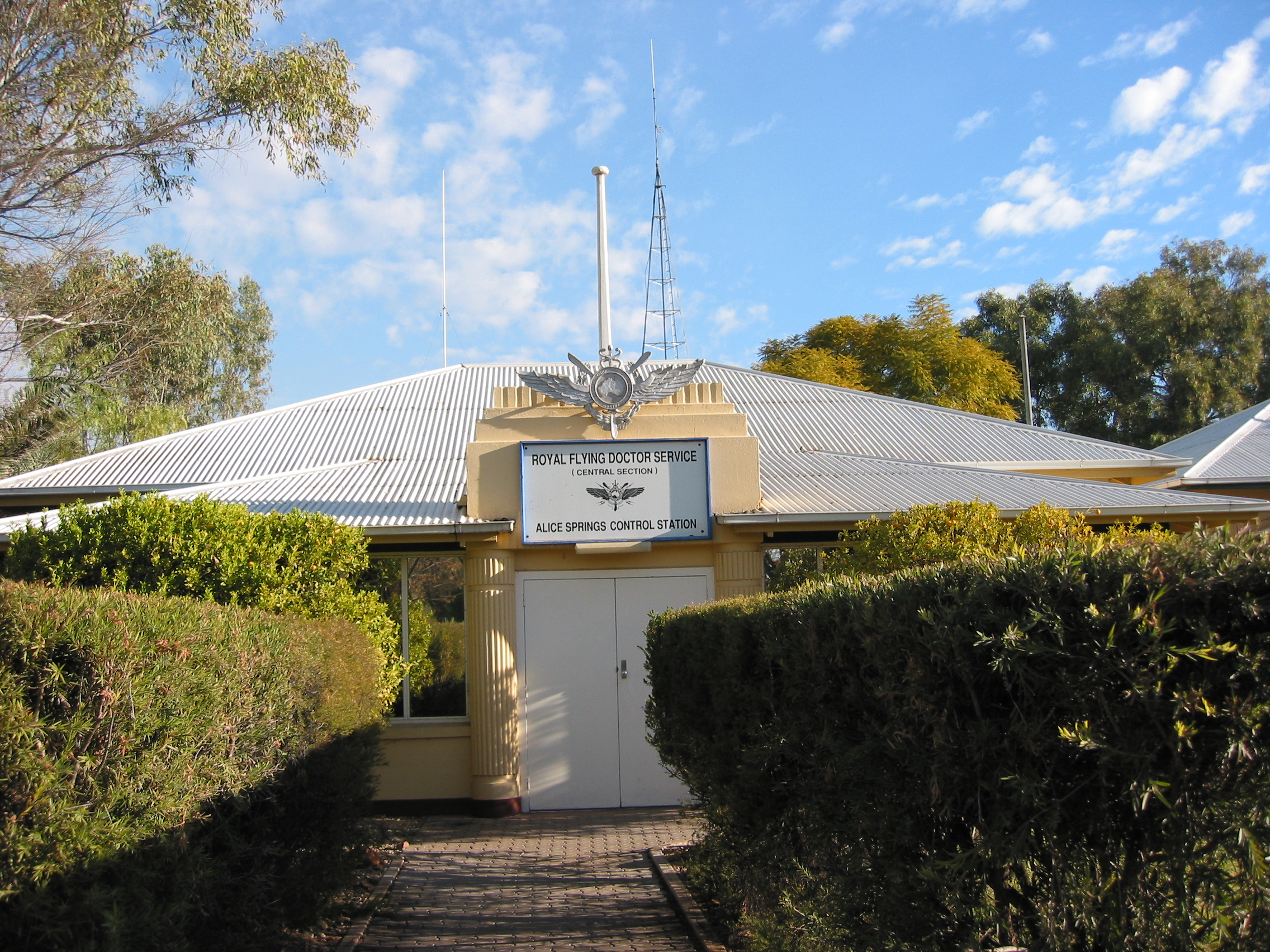
Main dispatch centre of the Royal Flying Doctor Service

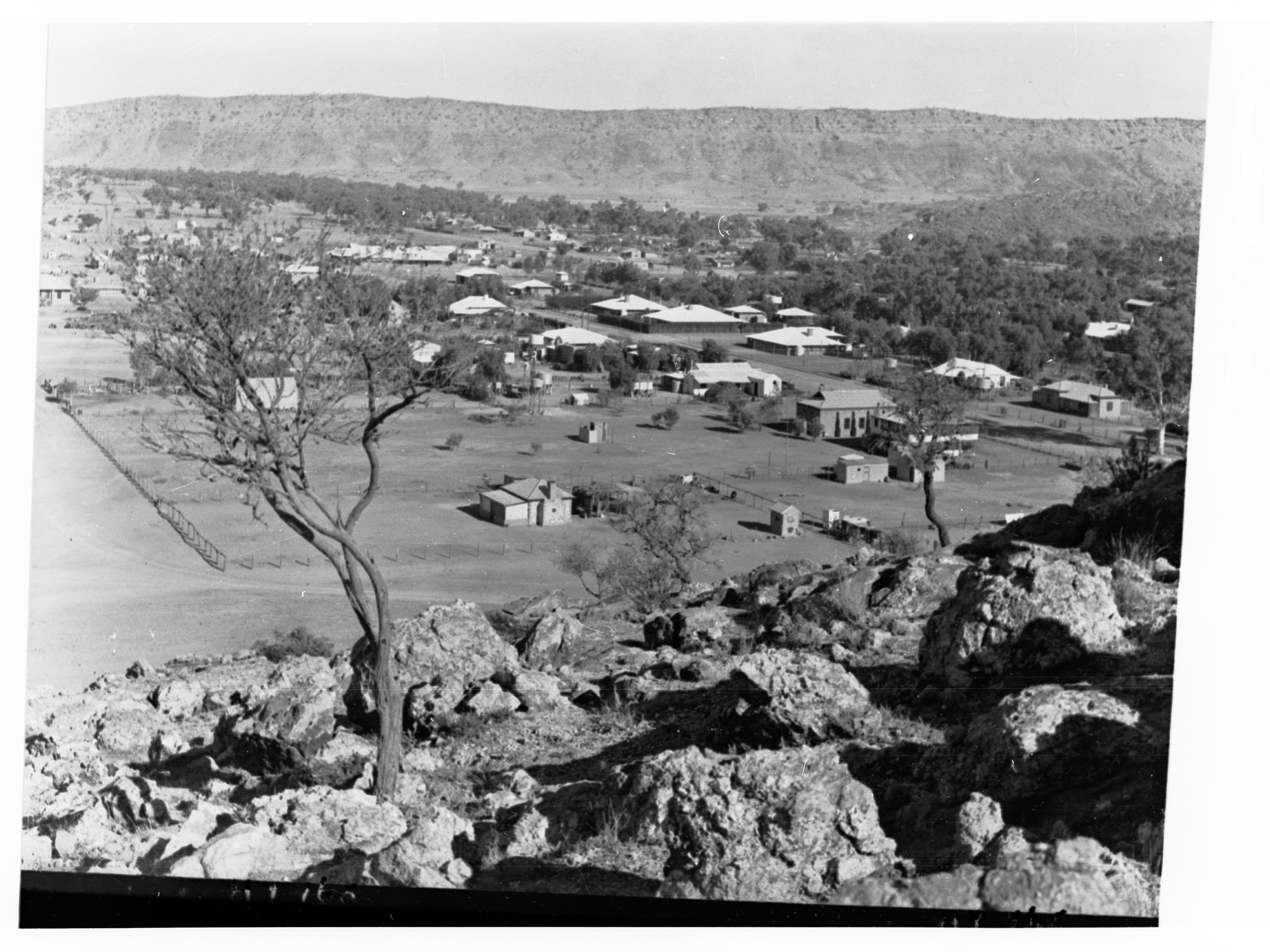
The township in 1935

The original mode of British-Australian transportation in the outback were camel trains, operated by immigrants from Pathan tribes in the North-West Frontier of then-British India (present-day Pakistan), known locally as Afghan cameleers based at Hergott Springs, or Marree as it is now known. Many cameleers moved to Alice Springs in 1929 when the railway finally reached the town. They lived on the block where the town council is now, transporting goods from the rail head to stations and settlements to the north. A gold rush in Tennant Creek in 1932 kept the wheels of the Alice Springs economy turning until the outbreak of World War II.

In 1941, Father Percy Smith, an Anglican minister, founded St John's Hostel in Bath Street. The hostel provided accommodation for Aboriginal and non-Aboriginal children from remote areas who were attending school in Alice Springs. He had been concerned at the lack of opportunities for children housed in the government facility for Aboriginal children in Alice Springs, called The Bungalow. Smith went on to found and run St Francis House in Adelaide in 1945, but St John's continued to operate. Children under the care of the Welfare Branch were also placed there, and the building had to be expanded. During World War II, the hostel served as a recreation centre for troops. The new two-storey building was designed to accommodate up to 50 children, with separate dormitories for boys and girls, each with separate study area and library. Several of the children were transferred to St Francis House over time, and St John's Hostel continued to operate until the 1970s.

=== World War II ===
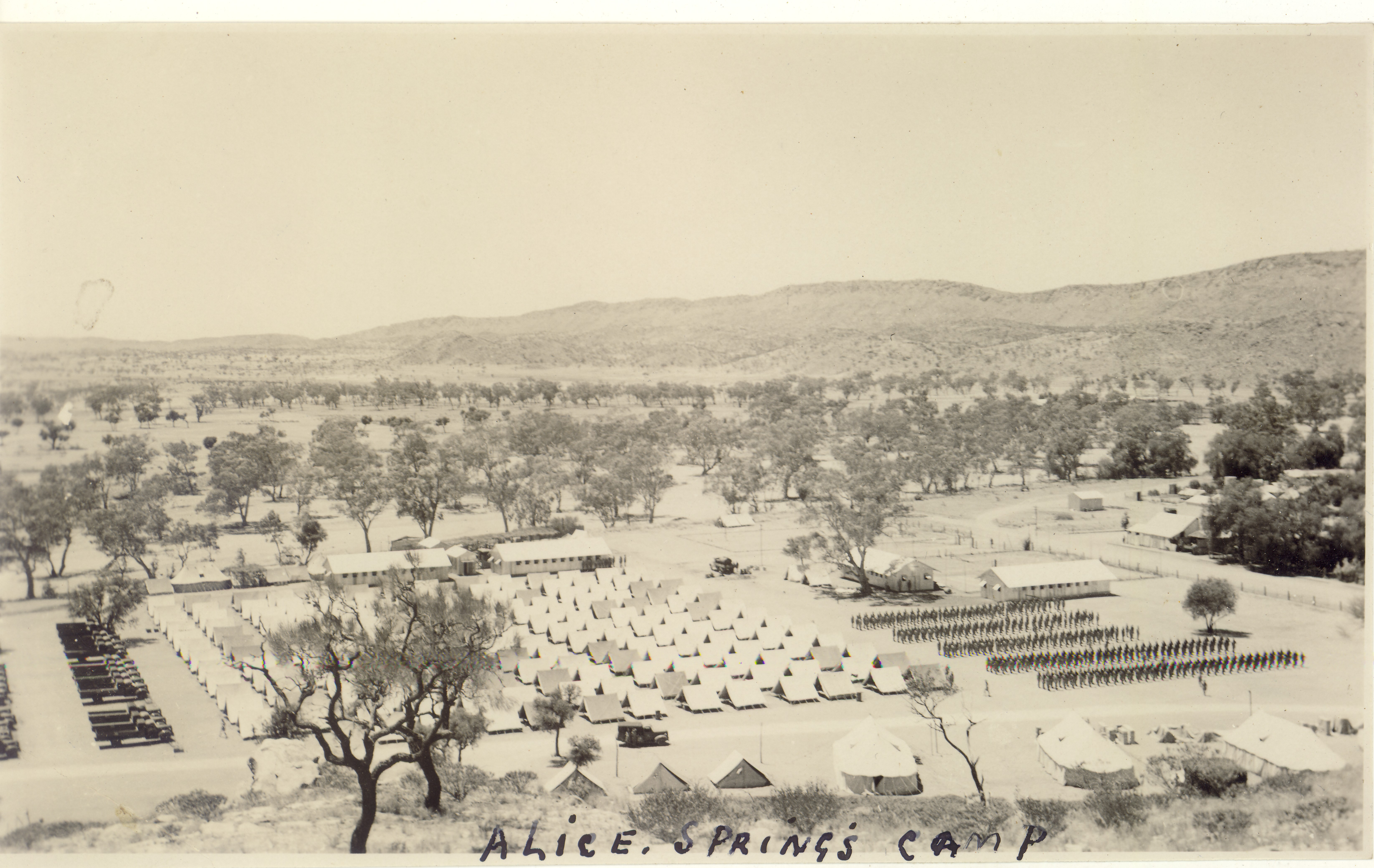
Army camp in Alice Springs during World War II, photo taken from the top of ANZAC Hill

World War II brought significant changes to Alice Springs. Prior to the war, Alice Springs was an isolated settlement of fewer than 500 people. During the war, however, the town was an extremely active staging base, known as No. 9 Australian Staging Camp, and a depot base for the long four-day trip to Darwin. The railway hub in Alice Springs was taken over by military operations, and the number of soldiers posted in Alice Springs grew rapidly, as did the number of personnel passing through on their way to and from Darwin. When Darwin was threatened by Japanese forces, the sea routes—the Northern Territory capital's primary means of transportation and resupply—were cut off. The evacuation of Darwin first brought a large number of civilians including elected officials and many of the territory government's records. Alice Springs became the war-time civilian capital of the Northern Territory. When Darwin was bombed by Japanese air forces, a large number of military personnel and their heavy equipment were rapidly moved south to Alice Springs.

The number of soldiers posted in Alice Springs peaked at around 8,000, and the number of personnel passing through totalled close to 200,000. Once the war ended, the military camps and the evacuees departed, and Alice Springs' population declined rapidly. After being visited by nearly 200,000 people, including the American General Douglas MacArthur, Alice Springs gained considerable fame. The war years also left behind many structures. The historically listed Totem Theatre, created for the entertainment of this camp, still exists today. The Australian Army set up the 109th Australian General Hospital at Alice Springs. Seven Mile Aerodrome was constructed by the Royal Australian Air Force. War-related operations necessitated the first sealing of the road between Alice Springs and Larrimah, expansion and improvement of Alice Springs' water supply, and improving the rail head. The war-related operations left behind thousands of pieces of excess military equipment and vehicles and a marked increase in Alice Springs' population.

During World War II, Alice Springs was the location of RAAF No. 24 Inland Aircraft Fuel Depot (IAFD), completed on 20 May 1942 and closed in November 1944. Each IAFD usually consisted of four tanks; 31 fuel depots were built across Australia for the storage and supply of aircraft fuel for the RAAF and the US Army Air Forces, at a total cost of £900,000 ($1,800,000).

=== After World War II ===
During the 1960s, Alice Springs became an important defence location with the development of the US/Australian Pine Gap joint defence satellite monitoring base, home to about 700 workers from both countries.

By far the major industry in recent times is tourism. Almost in the exact centre of the continent, Alice Springs is some 1,200 kilometres (750 mi) from the nearest ocean and 1,500 kilometres (930 mi) from the nearest major cities, Darwin and Adelaide. Alice Springs is at the midpoint of the Adelaide–Darwin Railway.

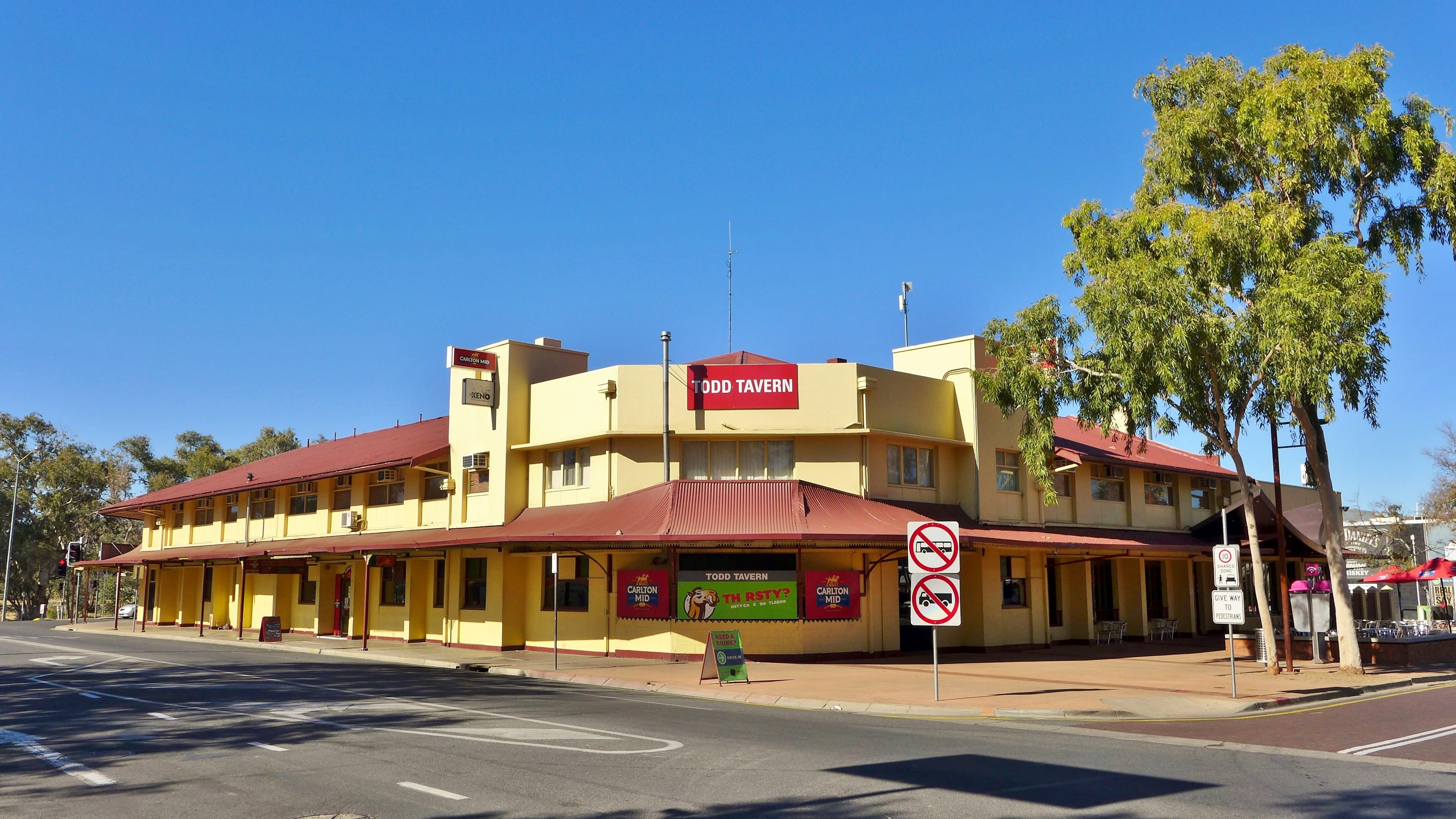
Todd Tavern

Alice Springs was connected to Darwin by rail on 4 February 2004, when the first passenger train arrived in Darwin from Adelaide.

== Modern town ==
The modern town of Alice Springs has both European and Aboriginal influences. The town's focal point, the Todd Mall, hosts a number of Aboriginal art galleries and community events including the fortnightly Todd Mall Markets. In February 2024, AIATSIS Central Australia information and exhibition centre opened in Todd Mall.

Alice Springs' desert lifestyle has inspired several unique events, such as the Alice Springs Camel Cup, the Henley-on-Todd Regatta, the Bangtail muster, Beanie Festival and the Finke Desert Race.

In May 2000 the Arrernte people were recognised by the Federal Court as the Traditional Owners of Alice Springs and they are recognised as the native title holders, with non-exclusive rights over their lands. This was the first successful native title claim in an urban area within Australia and the Prescribed Body Corporate for this claim is Lhere Artepe Aboriginal Corporation.

== Built environment ==
Alice Springs has many historic buildings, including the Overland Telegraph Station, the Old Courthouse and Residency and the Hartley Street School. Adelaide House, a stone building in the middle of the Mall, Central Australia's first hospital, was designed and built by the Rev. John Flynn, founder of the world's first flying doctor service, in 1926. It was also the site of the world's first successful portable wireless radio experiment conducted by Alf Traeger. Today it is a museum, one of several significant tourist attractions which form part of The Flynn Trail, a self-guided urban heritage trail.

Today, the town is an important tourist hub and service centre for the surrounding area. It has several large hotels, a convention centre, and a good range of visitor attractions, restaurants, and other services.

== Geography ==
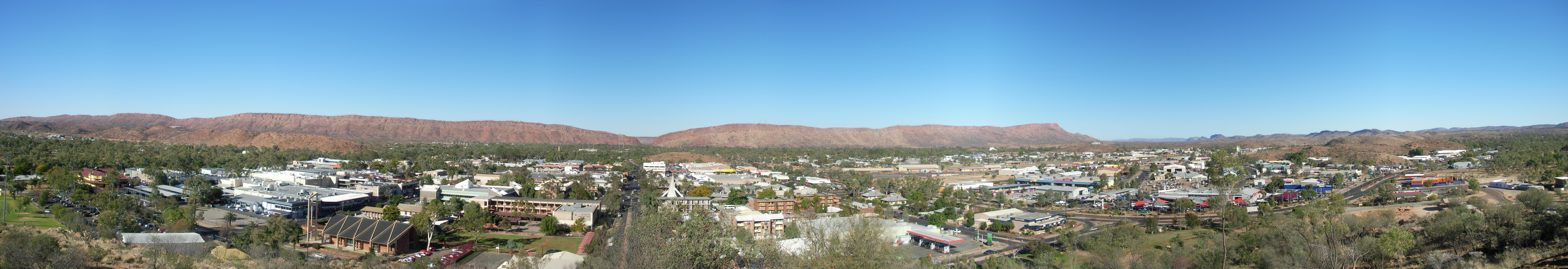
Panorama of Alice Springs

The region around Alice Springs is part of the Central Ranges xeric scrub area of dry scrubby grassland and includes the MacDonnell Ranges, which run east and west of the town and contain a number of hiking trails and swimming holes, such as Ormiston Gorge, Ormiston Gorge Creek, Red Bank Gorge and Glen Helen Gorge. The 223-kilometre-long (139 mi) Larapinta Trail follows the West MacDonnell Ranges and is considered among the world's great walking experiences.

The Simpson Desert, southeast of Alice Springs, is one of Australia's great wilderness areas, containing giant, red sand dunes and rock formations, such as Chambers Pillar and Rainbow Valley.

=== Climate ===
Under the Köppen climate classification, Alice Springs has a subtropical hot desert climate (BWh), featuring very hot, fairly dry summers and short, very dry, mild winters. Located just south of the Tropic of Capricorn, the town of Alice Springs straddles the usually dry Todd River on the northern side of the MacDonnell Ranges. Alice Springs is located in Central Australia, also called the Red Centre, an arid environment consisting of several different deserts. The annual average rainfall is 285.9 millimetres (11.3 in), which would make it a semi-arid climate, except that its high evapotranspiration, or its aridity, makes it a desert climate.

Annual precipitation is erratic. In 2001, 741 millimetres (29.2 in) fell and in 2002 only 198 millimetres (7.8 in) fell. The highest daily rainfall is 204.8 millimetres (8.06 in), recorded on 31 March 1988.

Temperatures in Alice Springs vary widely, and rainfall can vary quite dramatically from year to year. In summer, the average maximum temperature is in the mid-30s, whereas in winter the average minimum temperature can be 5.5 °C (41.9 °F), with an average of 12.4 nights below freezing every year, providing frost. The elevation of the town is about 545 metres (1,788 feet), which contributes to the cool nights in winter. The highest temperature on record is 47.5 °C (117.5 °F), first recorded on 24 December 1891, whilst the record low is −7.5 °C (18.5 °F), recorded on 17 July 1976. This is also the lowest temperature recorded in the Northern Territory.

Climate data for Alice Springs Airport (1991–2020 normals, extremes 1941–present)
Month	Jan	Feb	Mar	Apr	May	Jun	Jul	Aug	Sep	Oct	Nov	Dec	Year
Record high °C (°F)	45.6 (114.1)	44.7 (112.5)	44.5 (112.1)	39.9 (103.8)	35.0 (95.0)	31.6 (88.9)	31.8 (89.2)	36.6 (97.9)	38.8 (101.8)	42.6 (108.7)	44.9 (112.8)	47.5 (117.5)	47.5 (117.5)
Mean maximum °C (°F)	42.5 (108.5)	41.2 (106.2)	38.8 (101.8)	35.9 (96.6)	31.0 (87.8)	28.2 (82.8)	28.4 (83.1)	31.5 (88.7)	36.2 (97.2)	39.6 (103.3)	41.1 (106.0)	42.1 (107.8)	43.2 (109.8)
Mean daily maximum °C (°F)	37.1 (98.8)	35.8 (96.4)	33.5 (92.3)	29.3 (84.7)	23.6 (74.5)	20.1 (68.2)	20.7 (69.3)	23.5 (74.3)	28.8 (83.8)	31.9 (89.4)	34.4 (93.9)	35.7 (96.3)	29.5 (85.2)
Daily mean °C (°F)	29.7 (85.5)	28.5 (83.3)	25.7 (78.3)	21.1 (70.0)	15.8 (60.4)	12.4 (54.3)	12.3 (54.1)	14.7 (58.5)	20.0 (68.0)	23.4 (74.1)	26.4 (79.5)	28.2 (82.8)	21.5 (70.7)
Mean daily minimum °C (°F)	22.3 (72.1)	21.1 (70.0)	17.9 (64.2)	12.9 (55.2)	8.0 (46.4)	4.7 (40.5)	3.9 (39.0)	5.8 (42.4)	11.2 (52.2)	14.9 (58.8)	18.3 (64.9)	20.7 (69.3)	13.5 (56.2)
Mean minimum °C (°F)	15.9 (60.6)	14.9 (58.8)	10.6 (51.1)	6.2 (43.2)	1.7 (35.1)	−1.4 (29.5)	−2.1 (28.2)	−0.9 (30.4)	3.2 (37.8)	6.9 (44.4)	10.8 (51.4)	13.2 (55.8)	−2.7 (27.1)
Record low °C (°F)	10.0 (50.0)	8.5 (47.3)	6.1 (43.0)	1.4 (34.5)	−2.7 (27.1)	−6.0 (21.2)	−7.5 (18.5)	−4.1 (24.6)	−1.0 (30.2)	1.3 (34.3)	3.5 (38.3)	9.3 (48.7)	−7.5 (18.5)
Average rainfall mm (inches)	48.9 (1.93)	40.7 (1.60)	19.9 (0.78)	19.9 (0.78)	17.5 (0.69)	10.3 (0.41)	13.0 (0.51)	3.8 (0.15)	7.8 (0.31)	18.7 (0.74)	33.0 (1.30)	41.3 (1.63)	274.8 (10.83)
Average rainy days (≥ 1 mm)	3.7	3.2	2.0	1.4	1.9	1.5	1.4	0.9	1.3	2.4	3.9	5.0	28.6
Average afternoon relative humidity (%)	21	26	21	23	30	34	30	22	18	18	20	23	24
Average dew point °C (°F)	6.8 (44.2)	8.6 (47.5)	5.1 (41.2)	3.4 (38.1)	2.7 (36.9)	2.0 (35.6)	−0.2 (31.6)	−2.0 (28.4)	−0.9 (30.4)	−0.1 (31.8)	3.6 (38.5)	5.9 (42.6)	2.9 (37.2)
Mean monthly sunshine hours	316.2	274.0	297.6	291.0	266.6	252.0	285.2	313.3	303.0	316.2	297.0	294.5	3,506.6
Mean daily sunshine hours	10.2	9.7	9.6	9.7	8.6	8.4	9.2	10.1	10.1	10.2	9.9	9.5	9.6
Percentage possible sunshine	76	73	77	81	78	78	85	89	84	80	75	72	79
Average ultraviolet index	14	13	11	8	6	5	5	7	9	11	12	13	10
Source: Australian Bureau of Meteorology

== Demographics ==
Historical population
Year	Pop.	±%
2001	23,384	—
2006	21,622	−7.5%
2011	24,208	+12.0%
2016	23,726	−2.0%
2021	24,855	+4.8%
Source: ABS (Urban Centres and Localities)

According to the 2021 census of population, there were 24,855 people in the Alice Springs Urban Area.

- Aboriginal and Torres Strait Islander people made up 21.2% of the population.
- 66.7% of people were born in Australia, 3.9% in India, 3.3% in New Zealand, 2.7% in the United States, 2.4% in England, and 2.3% in the Philippines.
- 67.6% of people spoke only English at home. Other languages spoken at home included Arrernte 1.8%, Malayalam 1.8%, Punjabi 1.7%, Tagalog 1.1% and Warlpiri 1.1%.
- 51.6% of the population was irreligious in 2021. The largest religious groups included Christianity (41.1%), Hinduism (2.5%), Sikhism (1.5%), Buddhism (1.5%), and Islam (1.1%).
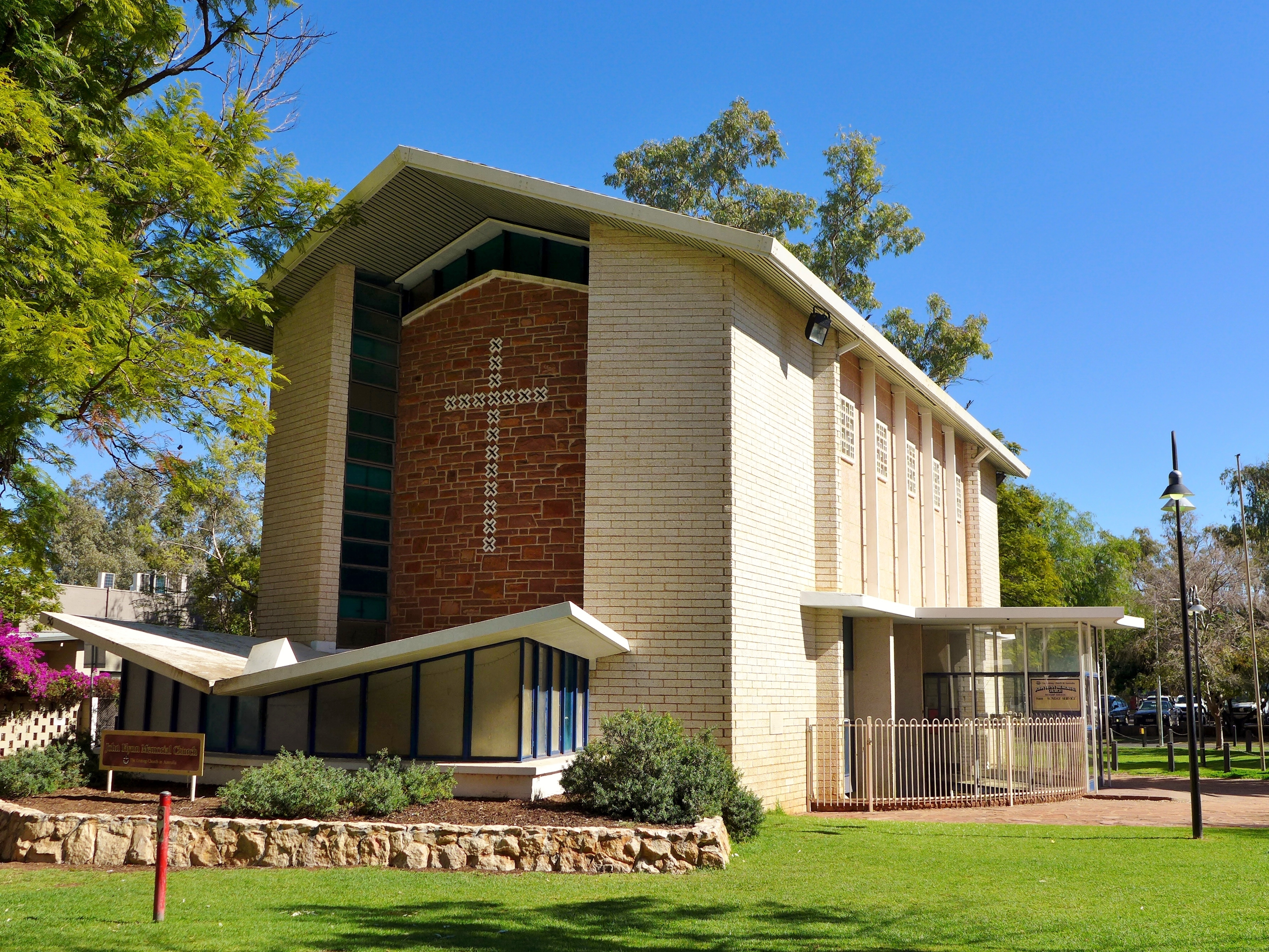
  John Flynn Memorial Church

=== Aboriginal population ===
As Alice Springs is the regional hub of Central Australia, it attracts Aboriginal people from all over that region and well beyond. Many Aboriginal people visit regularly to use the town's services. Aboriginal residents usually live in the suburbs, on special purpose leases (or town camps), or further out at Amoonguna to the south and on the small family outstation communities on Aboriginal lands in surrounding areas.

The traditional owners of the Alice Springs area are the Central Arrernte people. As it is the largest town in central Australia, there are also speakers of Warlpiri, Warumungu, Kaytetye, Alyawarre, Luritja, Pintupi, Pitjantjatjara, Yankunytjatjara, Ngaanyatjarra, Pertame, Eastern, and Western Arrernte among others.

=== Foreign and itinerant populations ===
==== American population ====
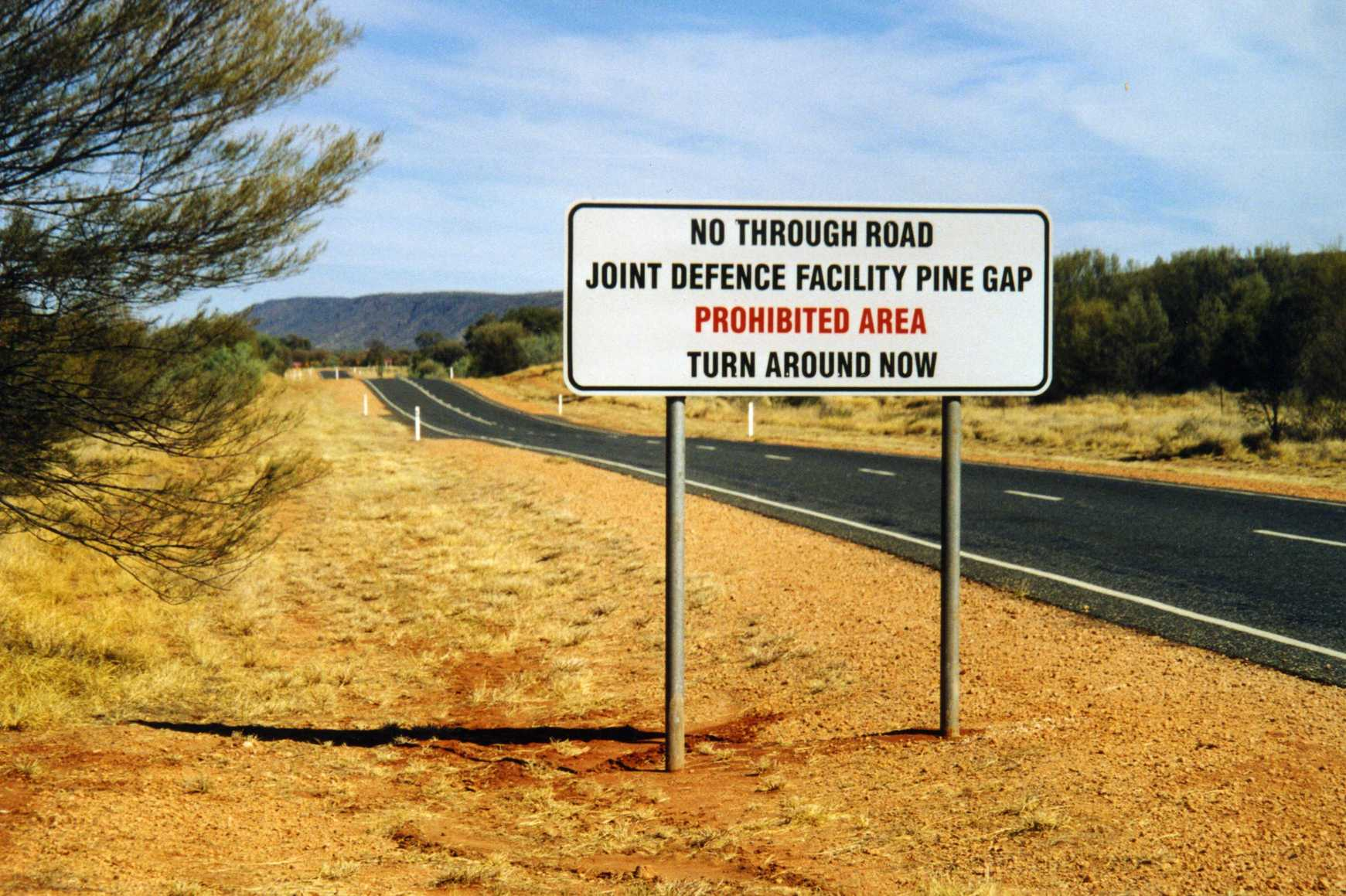
Prohibited Area sign on the road to Pine Gap

Americans have lived in Alice Springs continuously since the establishment of the United States Air Force Detachment 421, in 1954. Currently located on Schwarz Crescent, it is part of a joint American–Australian project called the Joint Geological and Geographical Research Station (JGGRS). The unit is locally known as "Det 421" or "The Det" and has sponsored as many as 25 American families to live as temporary residents of the Alice Springs district.

To mark the longstanding friendship with the community, on 1 July 1995, the Alice Springs Town Council granted Detachment 421 honorary Freedom of Entry to Alice Springs. Since the early 1970s, the majority of the American population in Alice Springs has been associated with proximity to Pine Gap, a joint Australian-US satellite tracking station, located 19 kilometres (12 mi) south-west of Alice Springs, that employs about 700 Americans and Australians.

Currently, 2,000 residents of the Alice Springs district hold American citizenship. Many of these, joined by some Australians, celebrate major American public holidays, including the 4th of July and Thanksgiving. Americans in Alice Springs are also known to participate in a variety of associations and sporting teams, including baseball, basketball and soccer competitions.

==== Other cultures ====
Several small immigrant communities of other foreign cultures have found a home in Alice Springs, including Vietnamese, Chinese, Thai, Sudanese and Indian ethnic groups. The most obvious impact of their presence in such a small and isolated town has been the opening of various restaurants serving their traditional cuisines.

==== Itinerant population ====
Alice Springs has a large itinerant population. This population is generally composed of foreign and Australian tourists, Aboriginal Australians visiting from nearby Central Australian communities, and Australian or international workers on short-term contracts (colloquially referred to as "blow-ins"). The major sources of work that recruit workers into town are the stations, mines, healthcare and law enforcement. Foreign tourists usually pass through on their way to Uluru-Kata Tjuta National Park, whilst Australian tourists usually come through as a part of an event such as the Masters Games and the Finke Desert Race. These events can cause the population of the town to fluctuate by several thousand within a matter of days.

== Government ==
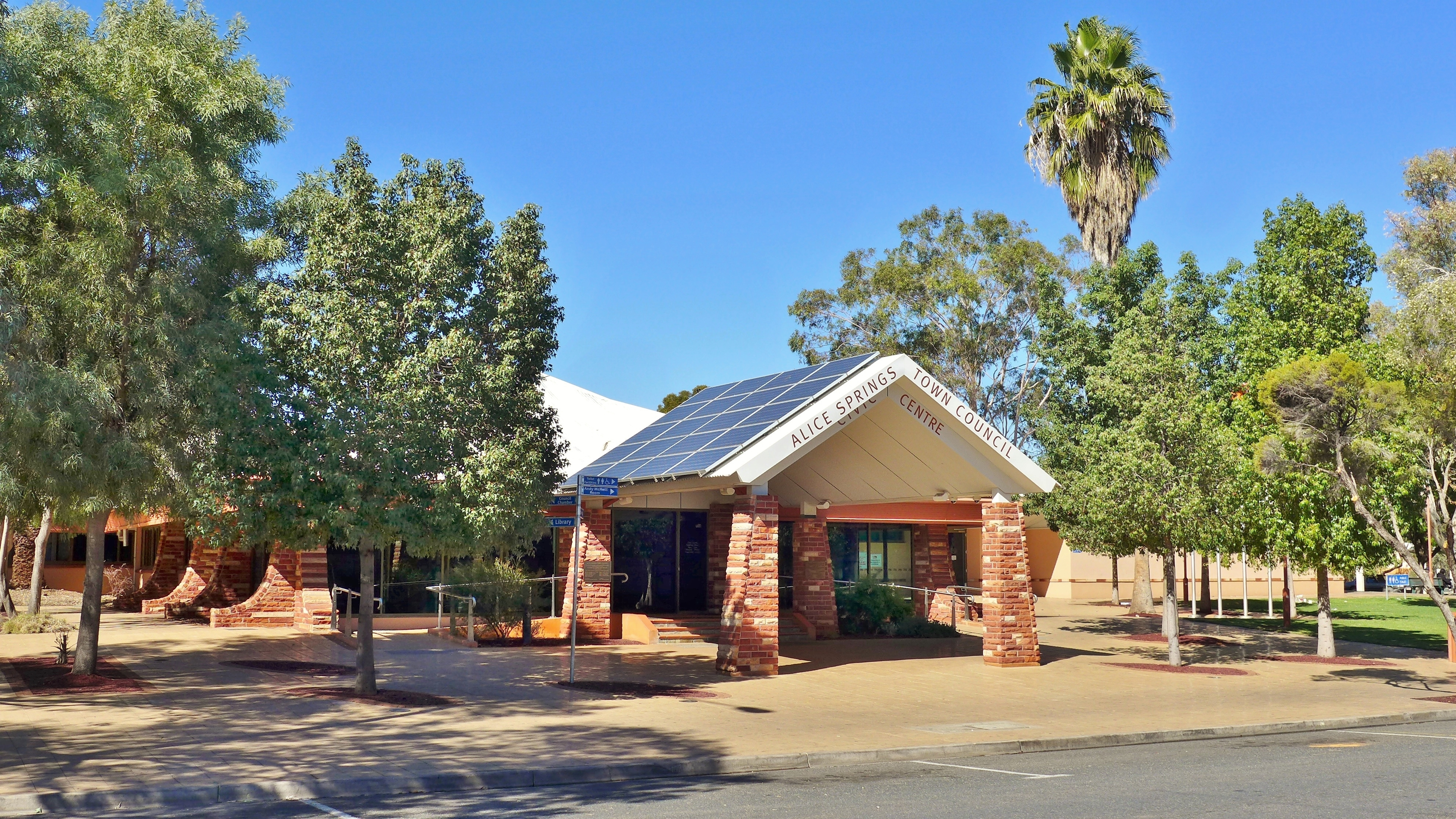
The Alice Springs Civic Centre is the seat of the Alice Springs Town Council.

The Alice Springs Town Council governs the Alice Springs area, which takes in the town centre, its suburbs and some rural area. The Alice Springs Town Council has governed Alice Springs since 1971. The Alice Springs council consists of nine members: the mayor and eight aldermen. The town is not divided up into wards. The current mayor of Alice Springs is Asta Hill. Council Meetings are held on the last Monday of each month. The Alice Springs Region is governed by the newly created MacDonnell Region local government area, for which Alice Springs serves as council seat.

Alice Springs and the surrounding region have four elected members to the Northern Territory Legislative Assembly. Araluen and Braitling are entirely within Alice Springs, while the mostly rural seats of Gwoja (known as Stuart before 2020) and Namatjira spill into the town. Historically, Alice Springs has tilted conservative. It was a stronghold for the Country Liberal Party for many years; only the northeast (part of which is in Stuart) leans Labor. However, these trends were dramatically altered at the 2016 election. Former Chief Minister and Alice Springs resident Adam Giles lost Braitling to Labor, Araluen was retained by CLP-turned-independent Robyn Lambley, and Namatjira and Stuart fell to Labor. As a result, the CLP was completely shut out of Alice Springs for the first time ever. The CLP regained Braitling and Namatjira in 2020, while Lambley retained Araluen for her party at the time, the Territory Alliance.

In the Australian House of Representatives, Alice Springs is part of the Division of Lingiari, which includes all of the Territory outside the Darwin/Palmerston area. Lingiari is currently held by Labor member Marion Scrymgour.

== Economy ==
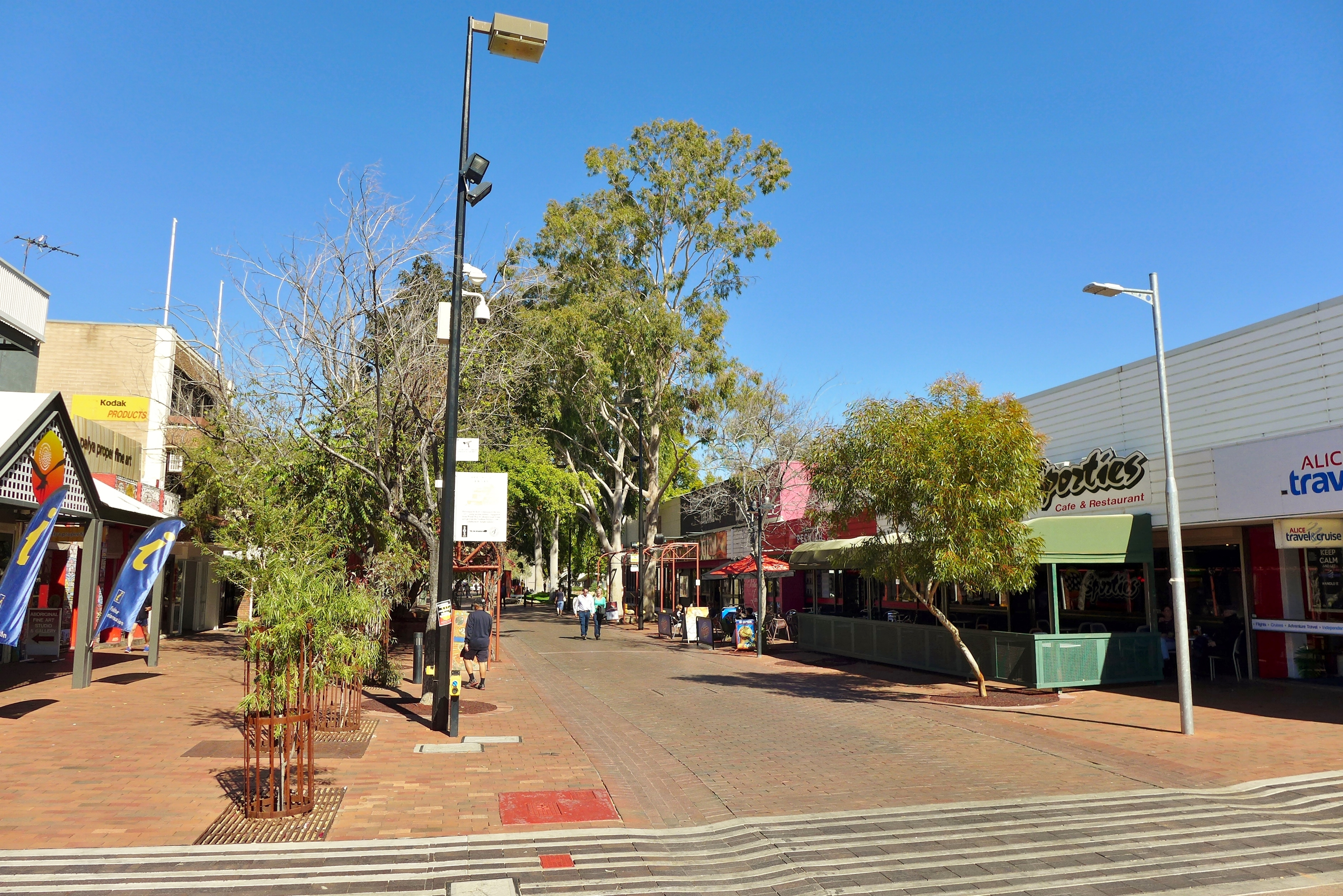
Todd Mall is a major commercial and retail area.

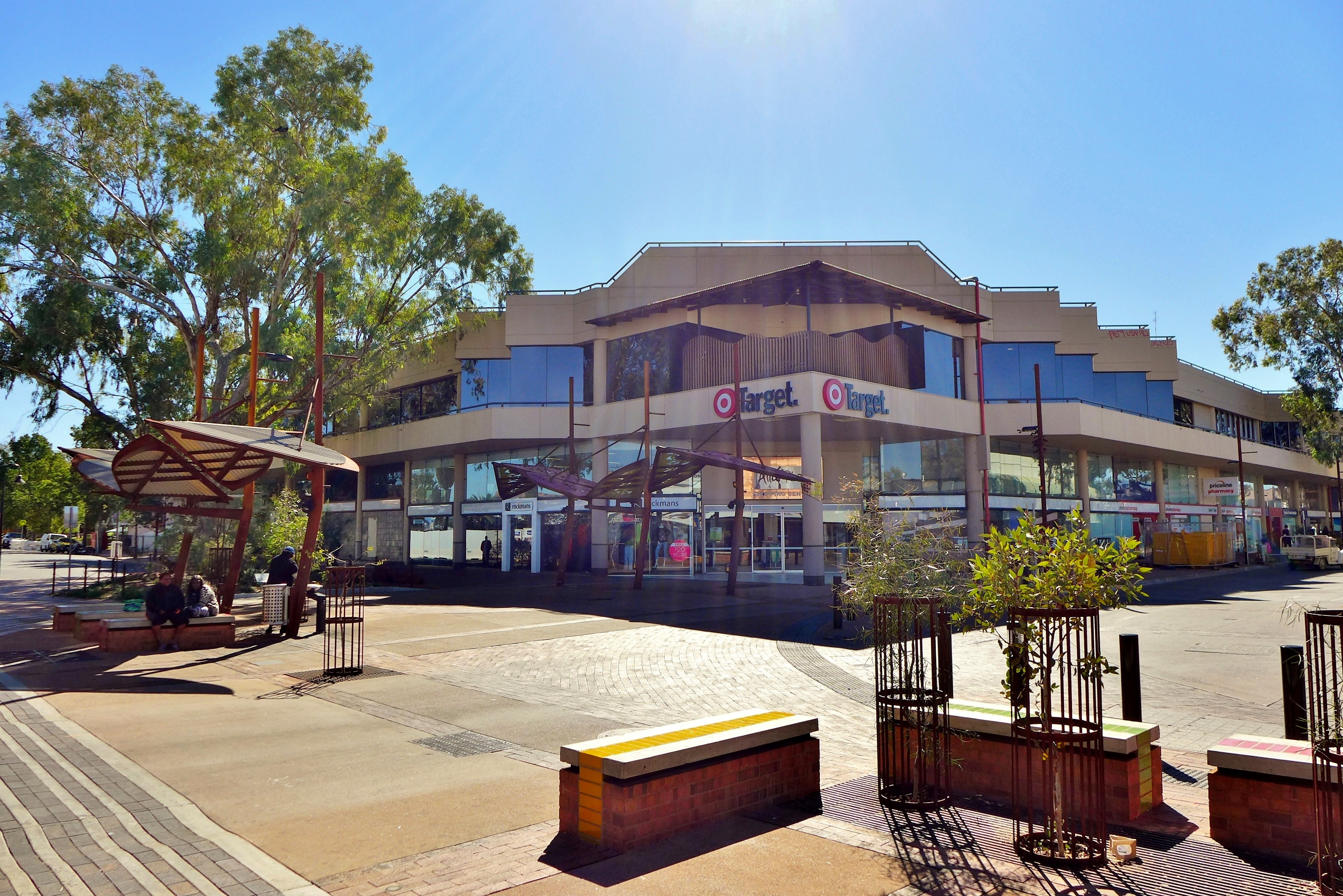
Alice Plaza

Alice Springs began as a service town to the pastoral industry that first came to the region. The introduction of the rail line increased its economy. Today the town services a region of 546,046 square kilometres (210,830 sq mi) and a regional population of 38,749. The region includes a number of mining and pastoral communities, the Joint Defence Space Research Facility at Pine Gap and tourist attractions at Uluṟu-Kata Tjuṯa National Park, Watarrka National Park and the MacDonnell Ranges.

The largest employer in Alice Springs is the Northern Territory Government, with 8% of employed people working in government administration, 7% in school education, and 4% in the Alice Springs Hospital. The economy of Alice Springs is somewhat reliant on domestic and international tourism, with 4% of its workforce employed providing accommodation. Several major tour companies have a base in Alice Springs, as well as numerous local operators offering tours to sites in the region, including Uluru and the MacDonnell Ranges.

A dispatch centre for the Royal Flying Doctor Service operates here.

== Education ==
Education is overseen territory-wide by the Department of Education and Training (DET). It works to continually improve education outcomes for all students, with a focus on Indigenous students.

Alice Springs is served by a number of public and private schools that cater to local and overseas students.

Alice Springs School of the Air delivers education to students in remote areas.

There are 10 private schools. Yirara College is a co-educational secondary boarding school catering for around 200 Aboriginal students run by the Finke River Mission. It has another campus in Kintore (Walungurru), which has four rooms and caters for around 30 students.

The Alice Springs Campus of Charles Darwin University offers courses in TAFE and higher education. The Centre for Appropriate Technology was established in 1980 and provides a range of services to encourage and help Aboriginal people enhance their quality of life in remote communities.

== Recreation and culture ==
=== Events and festivals ===
==== Parrtjima − A Festival in Light ====
Parrtjima − A Festival in Light (pronounced par-chee-ma) subtitled − A Festival in Light, takes place over 10 days each April in the desert outside Alice Springs. The name means "shedding both light and understanding" in the local Arrernte language, and the festival aims "to celebrate the oldest continuous cultures in the world through the latest technology". It includes light shows, artworks, storytelling, and other manifestations of Aboriginal Australian culture, and both Alice Springs Desert Park and at the Araluen Arts Centre are also venues for interactive workshops, Indigenous music and dance, films by Aboriginal filmmakers, and talks. The festival has free admission.

The festival has run annually since 2016, with two people credited with being its driving forces: Yankunytjatjara / Wangkangurru / Arrernte man Paul Ah Chee, who is the festival's director of cultural engagement as well as chair of the Northern Territory Aboriginal Tourism Committee, and also a musician; and "cultural powerhouse" Rhoda Roberts. In 2017, Roberts became creative director of the festival.

In 2022, the festival was curated for the fifth time by Roberts. It featured a 2-kilometre (1.2 mi) stretch of light installations; musical acts Dan Sultan, BARKAA, and King Stingray; and a retrospective of the work of Indigenous filmmaker Warwick Thornton.

In 2023, Roberts once again curated Parrtjima. The festival featured the artwork which women artists of Mutitjulu had created for the Uluru Statement from the Heart, led by Rene Kulitja, as a huge immersive light installation. The theme of the festival is "Listen with the heart", and musicians performing at the festival include Richard Frankland and JK-47.

Roberts curated the festival on its 10th anniversary in 2025. She died in March 2026.

==== Other events ====
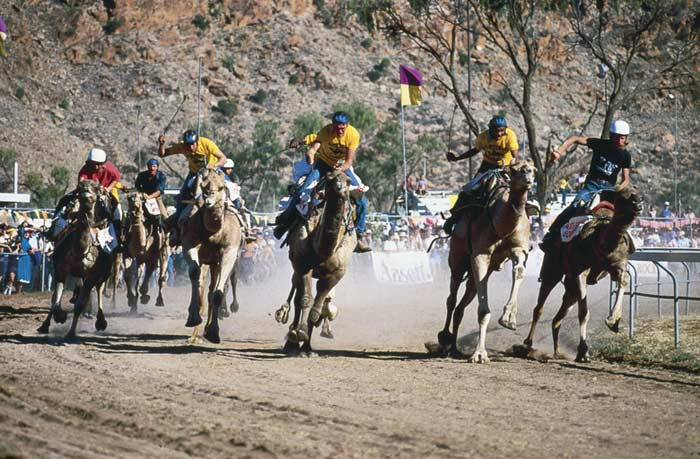
Camel Cup, Alice Springs

The town's focal point, the Todd Mall, hosts a number of Aboriginal art galleries and community events. Alice Springs' desert lifestyle has inspired several unique events, such as the Alice Desert Festival, the Red Centre NATS, Blacken Open Air music festival, the Camel Cup, the Henley-on-Todd Regatta, the Beanie Festival, and the Finke Desert Race. The Finke Desert Race is a "there and back" challenge from Alice Springs to Aputula (Finke) Community, covering a 460-kilometre (290 mi) round trip.

=== Arts and entertainment ===
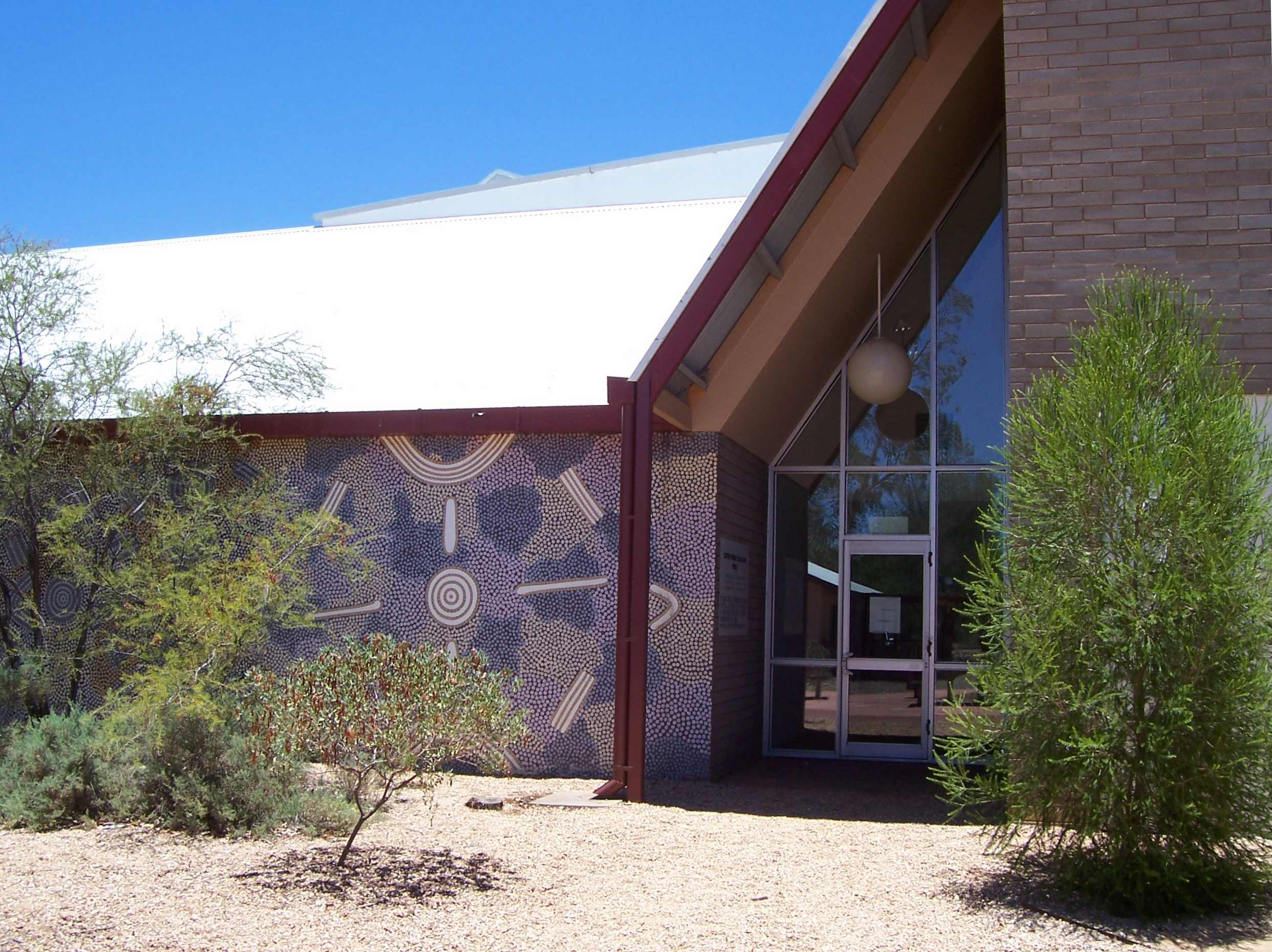
Araluen Centre for Arts and Entertainment

==== Galleries and museums ====
Alice Springs is home to many local and Aboriginal art galleries. Several galleries showcase Indigenous Australian art. Trade in Aboriginal art soared after the painting movement began at Papunya, a Central Australian Aboriginal settlement, and swept other Indigenous communities. Central Australia is the home of some of the most prominent names in Aboriginal art, including Emily Kngwarreye, Minnie Pwerle, Clifford Possum Tjapaltjarri, Albert Namatjira, and Wenten Rubuntja.

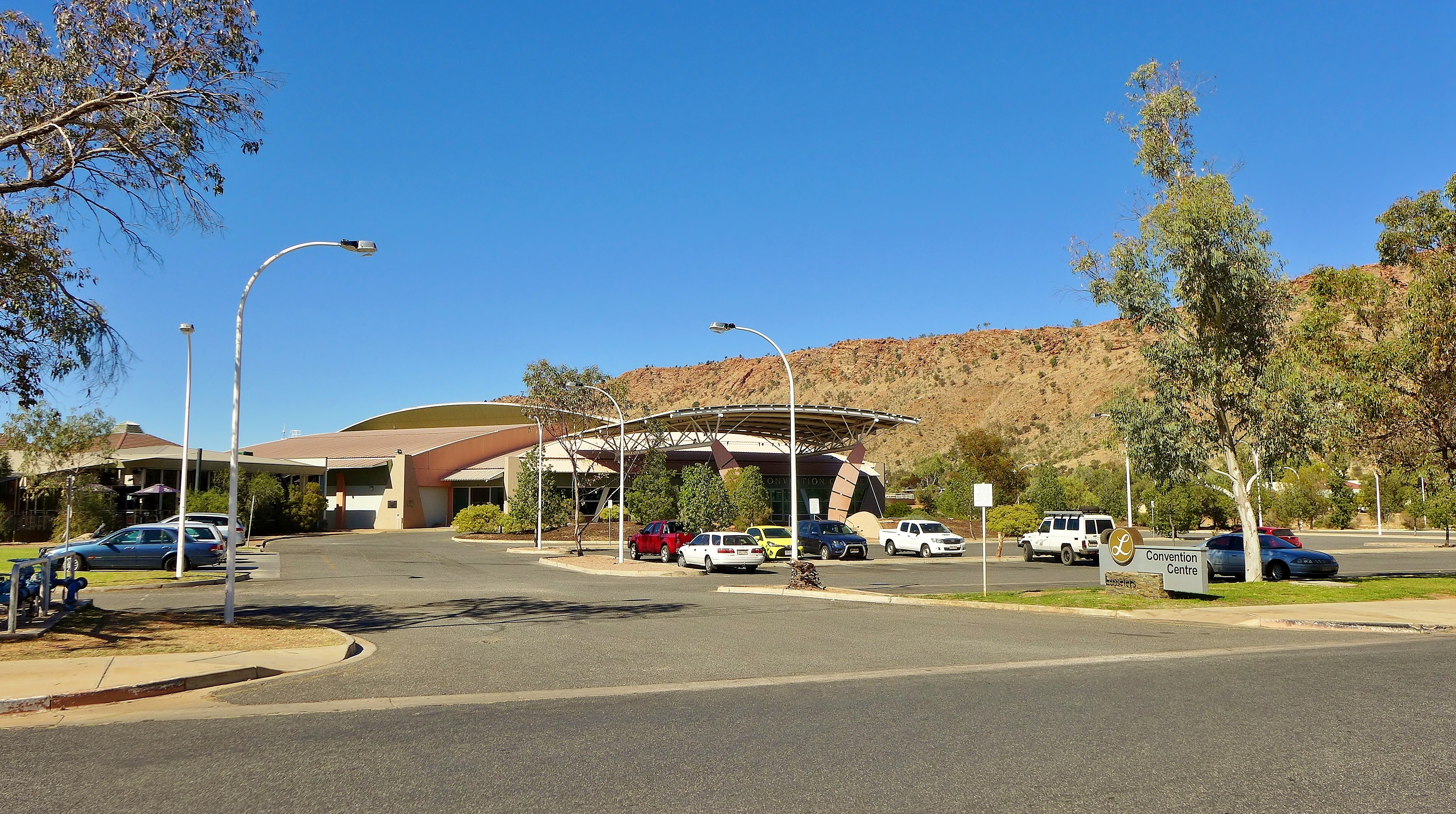
Alice Springs Convention Centre

The Museum of Central Australia / Strehlow Research Centre features some of the most important natural history and archival materials tied to the history and culture of the region. The Strehlow Archives, containing the work of Carl Strehlow, also contain materials linked to the Arrernte people of Central Australia.

The Araluen Centre for Arts and Entertainment presents world-class ballets and orchestras, as well as local performances.

The Women's Museum of Australia (formerly National Pioneer Women's Hall of Fame) is located in the grounds of Old Alice Springs Gaol in the Heritage Precinct. Here women's stories from across Australia are presented with the lives of outback women as well as stories from the Old Gaol and Labour Prison. Objects include a large "Signature" quilt with signatures of over 300 women first in their field and a 4.2 m long Aviatrix tapestry celebrating the high flying lives of Australia's women aviators.

The town has some excellent small museums. The extensive collection at the Old Timer's Traeger Museum on the North Stuart Highway includes artefacts from the town's early Afghan and German residents, traditional Aboriginal artefacts and objects which show the early fusion of European and Aboriginal cultures, such as a spinifex-handled glass-bladed knife. Included in the collection are soapstone carvings by Arrernte artist Erlikilyika.

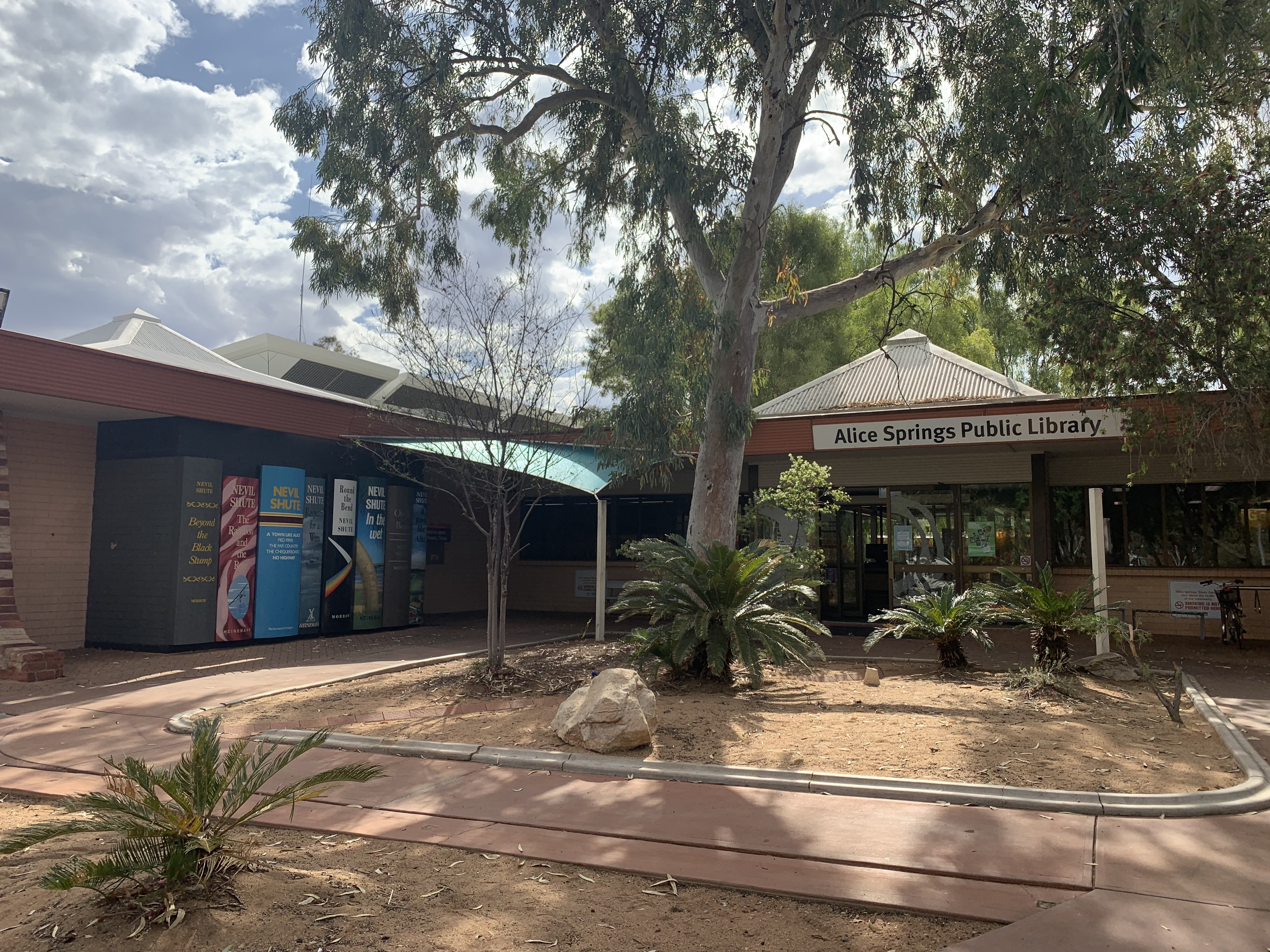
Alice Springs Public Library

==== Library, archives, and other collections ====
Alice Springs is home to the Alice Springs Public Library, also known as the Nevil Shute Memorial Library. The library, in addition to its general borrowable collections (including e-resources), is also home to two special, not-for-loan, collections. These are the Alice Springs Collection and the Akaltye Atheme Collection, both of which specifically collect Central Australian content, including Aboriginal language resources (from around 16 local languages) and cultural heritage information. The Alice Springs Collection also holds a significant digital collection, including PDF copies of the Centralian Advocate from 1947 to 2015, and over 6000 images, primarily from the Central Australian Historical Images Collection.

Library & Archives NT also has offices in Alice Springs, located at Minerals House on Hartley Street, which holds archival collections relating to Central Australia, including Tennant Creek. Collections held here include community collections and government archives.

AIATSIS Central Australia provides access to the major online repositories held by the Canberra-based Australian Institute of Aboriginal and Torres Strait Islander Studies, including family history, photographs, and other publications and artefacts.

Other collecting institutions, excluding schools, include:

- Arid Zone Research Institute (AZRI) Library
- Batchelor Institute of Indigenous Tertiary Education Library, Desert Peoples Centre Campus Library
- Central Land Council Library
- Charles Darwin University Library
- NT Department of Health Library
- Strehlow Research Centre Library

=== Outdoors ===
Leisure and entertainment activities include hiking in the nearby MacDonnell Ranges and driving the four-wheel-drive tracks at Finke Gorge National Park.

==== Parks and gardens ====
The Alice Springs Desert Park was created to educate visitors about the many facets of the surrounding desert environment. The arid climate botanic garden, Olive Pink Botanic Garden, is a short distance from the town centre. They were named after anthropologist, naturalist and artist Olive Pink, who lived in the town for almost 30 years and died in 1975. She was well known locally and referred to by all as Miss Pink. The Alice Springs Reptile Centre is located in the town centre.

==== Sport ====
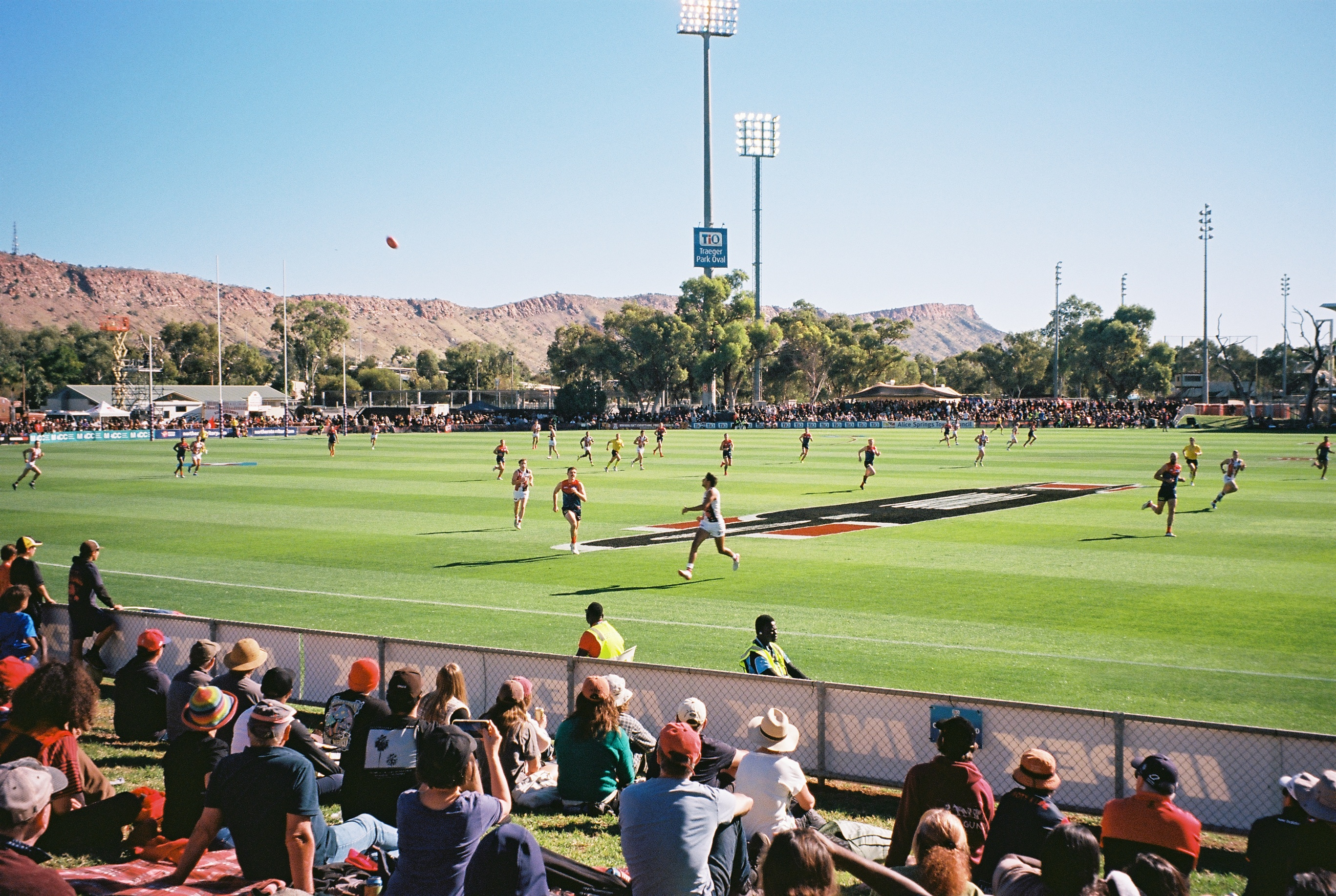
Traeger Park, Alice Springs

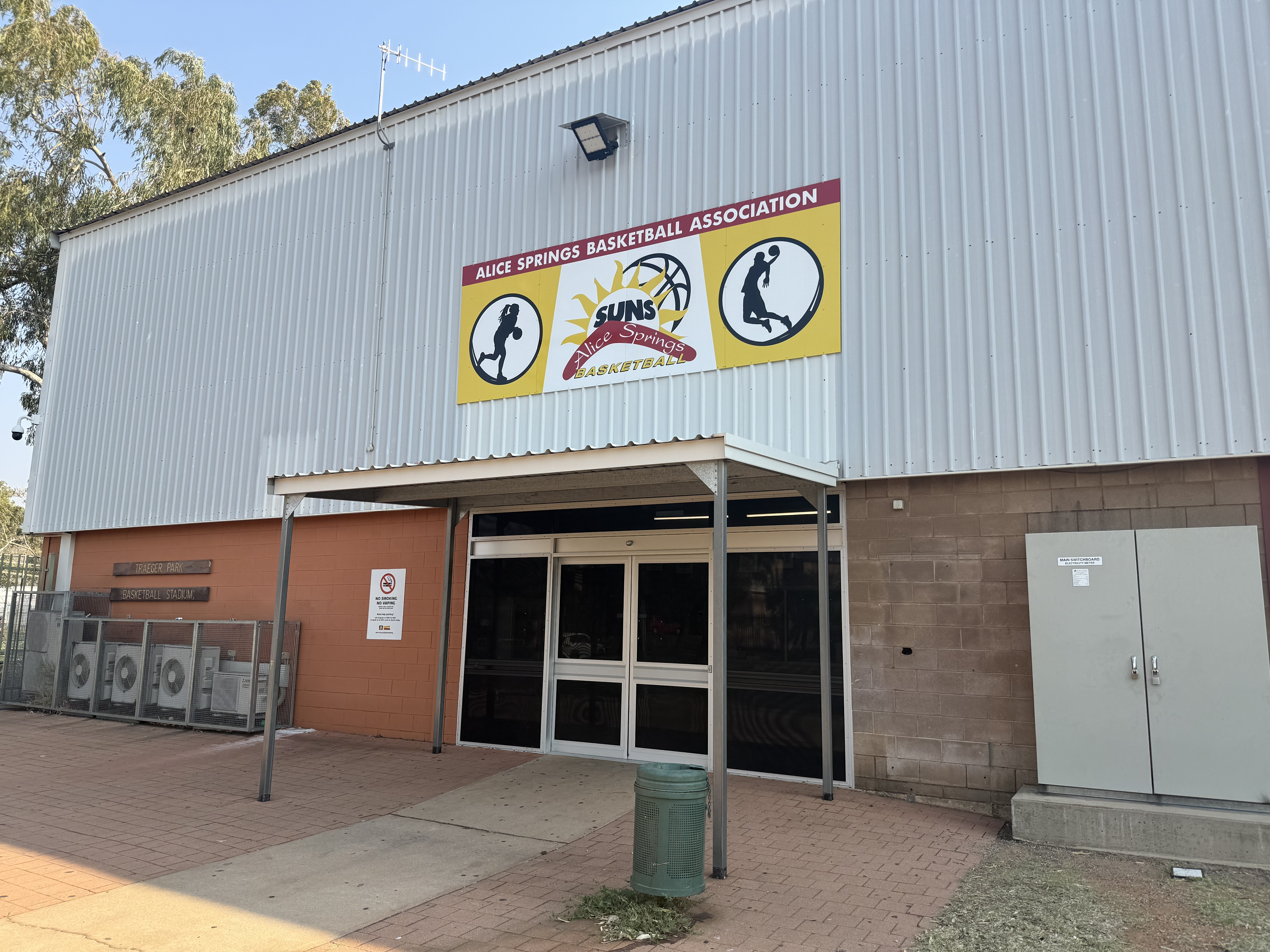
Traeger Park Basketball Stadium, October 2025

Alice Springs has a high rate of participation in many different sports, including Australian rules, baseball, basketball, boxing, cricket, football, golf, hockey, rugby and tennis.

Australian rules is a particularly popular sport in Alice Springs in terms of both participation and as a spectator sport. The Central Australian Football League formed in 1947 has several teams. The sport is particularly popular in Indigenous communities. The local stadium, Traeger Park, has a 10,000 seat capacity and was designed to host (pre-season) AFL and was the home to the Northern Territory Thunder until 2019. In 2004, an AFL pre-season Regional Challenge match between Collingwood Football Club and Port Adelaide Football Club attracted a capacity sell-out crowd.

Association football is popular among the younger community. A high number of children play the game. It is also played frequently by amateur adults in different divisions. There is also an all-African league in Alice Springs.

Both codes of Rugby are played in Alice Springs. Rugby union, managed by the Central Australian Rugby Union Association (CARU) is played in conjunction with the Northern Territory Rugby Union calendar which runs during Darwin's dry season. The Central Australian Rugby Union administers a four team competition based in Alice Springs with matches played between October and March at ANZAC Oval. The First Central Australian Club Competition commenced in 1986. There are four senior teams; Dingo Cubs Rugby Union, Kiwi Warriors Rugby Union, Eagles Rugby Union and Devils Rugby Union.

Rugby league has been a part of the local sporting scene since 1963. The Australian Rugby League has held a number of pre-season games in Alice Springs, at ANZAC Oval. The local competition is the Central Australian Rugby League and sanctions both Junior and Senior Rugby League matches. The season usually kicks off around March/April and runs through to Late August. There are four senior teams in Alice Springs: Wests, Memo, United and Vikings. Matches are held during the winter months at ANZAC oval on Saturday afternoons.

Cricket is a popular sport in Alice Springs and is primarily played at Traeger Park. The Imparja Cup Cricket Carnival first was played in 1994 and attracts Indigenous teams from all across Australia. The four main clubs are Federal Demons CC, Rovers CC, RSL Works CC and Wests CC.

Organized baseball has been played in Alice Springs since the mid-1950s. Currently under the national organisation of the Australian Baseball Federation, the Alice Springs Baseball Association organises baseball competitions for youth players aged 5 to 18 and an adult competition played at Jim McConville Park and on Lyel Kempster Field at Traeger Park. As part of the worldwide Little League network, Alice Springs players and compete in the Australian National Little League competitions.

The Alice Springs Golf Course, an 18-hole championship layout golf course designed by the architects Thomson Wolveridge, was opened in 1985 by a challenge match between top professionals Greg Norman and Johnny Miller. The course record of 64 is held jointly by, amateur members, Leigh Shacklady and Kerryn Heaver, beating professional Stuart Appleby's 65. Adam Scott won the Australian Boys Amateur Championship held there in 1997.

The Traeger Park sporting complex also hosts tennis, baseball, boxing, swimming, canoe polo, hockey, basketball, squash, badminton, gymnastics and skateboarding.

A unique sporting event, held annually, is the Henley-on-Todd Regatta, also known as the Todd River Race. It is a sand river race with bottomless boats and it remains the only dry river regatta in the world. Another unusual sporting event is the Camel Cup. The annual Camel Cup is held in July at Blatherskite Park, part of the Central Australian Show Society grounds. It is a full day event featuring a series of races using camels instead of horses.

Every year, on the Queen's Birthday long weekend, the annual Finke Desert Race is held. It is a gruelling off-road race that runs from Alice Springs to the Finke community, then back again the next day. The total length of the race is roughly 500 kilometres (310 mi). It attracts spectators, who camp along the whole length of the track, and roughly 500 competitors, buggies and bikes, every year, making it the biggest sporting event in the Alice Springs calendar.

Drag racing is held at the Alice Springs Inland Dragway which in June 2013 hosted a round of the national Aeroflow Sportsman Drag Racing Championship. In September 2017 12 people were injured when burning fuel sprayed from a drag-racing car onto a crowd of spectators at the Red CentreNATS competition.

Alice Springs is also home to the Arunga Park Speedway, a 402-metre dirt oval speedway. The speedway runs from August to March and caters to cars, solos and sidecars. Located just off the Stuart Highway on the northern edge of the town, Arunga Park hosted the Australian Sidecar Championship in 1985 and the Australian Solo Championship in 1991.

== Crime ==
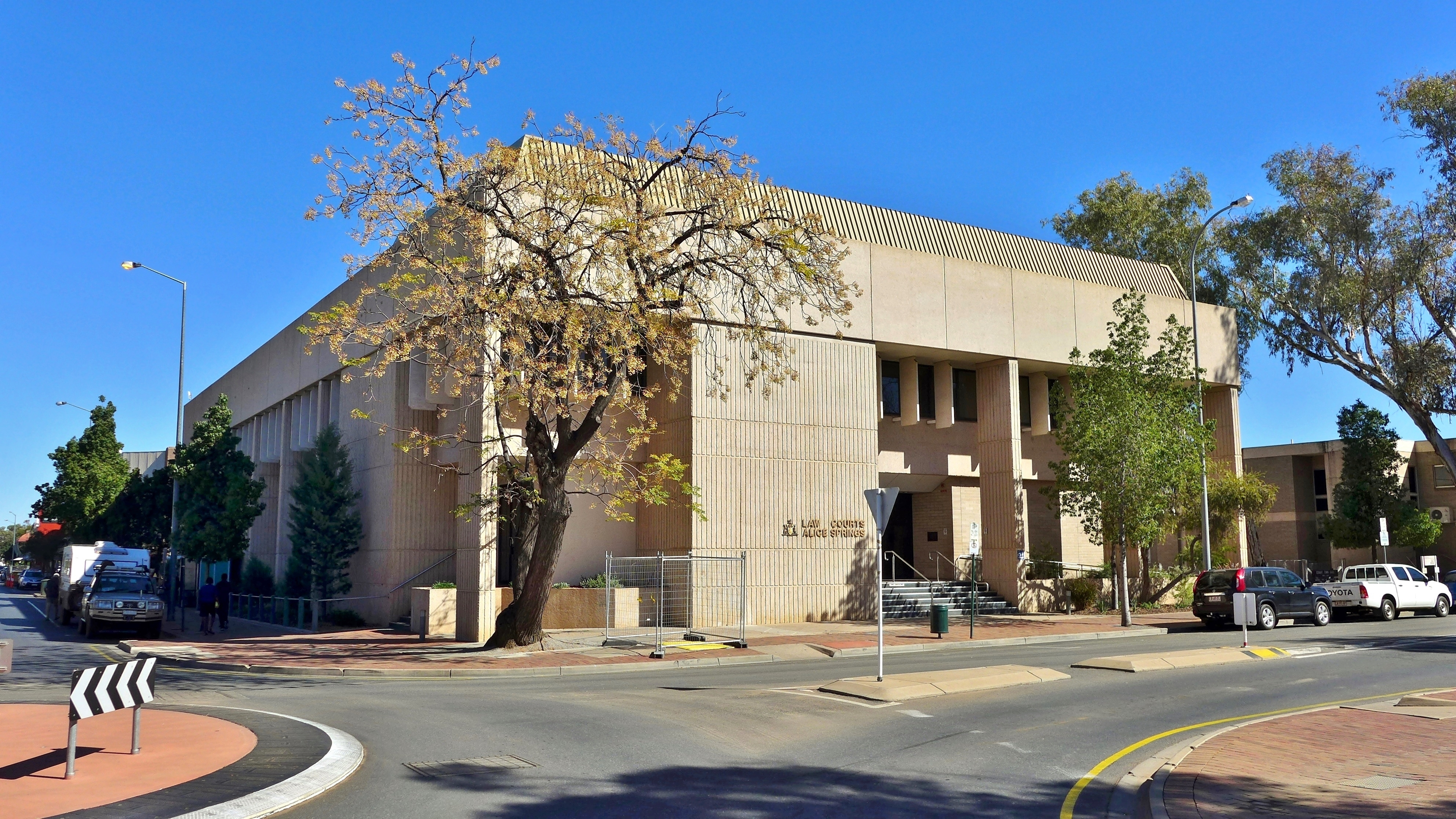
Law Courts building

Property crime and violent crime, including domestic violence, often linked to alcohol and drug abuse, has been a significant social issue in Alice Springs in the 21st century, with most of the victims being residents of the town. Many approaches and programs have been tried over the years, with varying levels of success. After crime in the town rose dramatically since the Northern Territory Government lifted alcohol bans for many communities in 2022, the bans were reintroduced in early 2023.

In 2024, a series of curfews were introduced to combat crime. However, the crime rate remained high and violent riots occurred in 2026.

== In popular culture ==
- The TV series Pine Gap (2018) is set around the Australian and American joint defence intelligence facility at Pine Gap, near Alice Springs.
- Liz Phair included a song called "Alice Springs" on her 1994 album Whip-Smart.
- The group Midnight Oil mention Alice Springs in their songs "Kosciusko" and "Warakurna" ('There is enough in Redfern as there is in Alice'); and they mention Pine Gap in "Power and the Passion".
- The Australian song "My Island Home" was originally written about the experience of an islander living "west of Alice Springs", and this is mentioned in the lyrics of the original Warumpi Band version of the song.
- Nevil Shute's novel A Town Like Alice, and the resulting film and television mini-series, take their name from Alice Springs, although little of the action takes place there, because part of the story is set in Willstown (possibly modelled on Burketown), north of Alice Springs, near the Gulf of Carpentaria. The heroine, Jean, wants to change Willstown into a town "like" Alice. The local library in Alice Springs is named after Nevil Shute: the Nevil Shute Memorial Library.
- Lasseters Casino in Alice Springs is the destination for the drag queen protagonists in the Australian road movie The Adventures of Priscilla, Queen of the Desert. The movie became a hit West End show before transferring to Broadway.
- The Western film Quigley Down Under was filmed on location in Alice Springs.
- Alice Springs is featured in Bruce Chatwin's 1987 travelogue The Songlines, recounting the author's retreat into the Australian Outback in search of the Aboriginals' Dreaming-tracks.
- Alice Springs is featured in Bill Bryson's 2000 travelogue Down Under (also known as "In a Sunburned Country"). Bryson visits and describes scenes of Alice Springs, including the Telegraph Office, the Springs, and his trip to Uluru from Alice Springs.
- Dick Diver released a song called "Alice" on the 2013 album Calendar Days.
- The opening track of Mystery Jets' 2011 album Serotonin is titled "Alice Springs", inspired by a tour in Australia.
- Ian Moss released a song called "Such a Beautiful Thing" on the 1988 album Matchbook, which contains the lyrics "thinking back to Alice Springs". He has said the song is a tribute to the Northern Territory.
- The 2011 video game Resistance 3 features a multiplayer map set in Alice Springs in a post-apocalyptic alternate history version of 1957

== Media ==
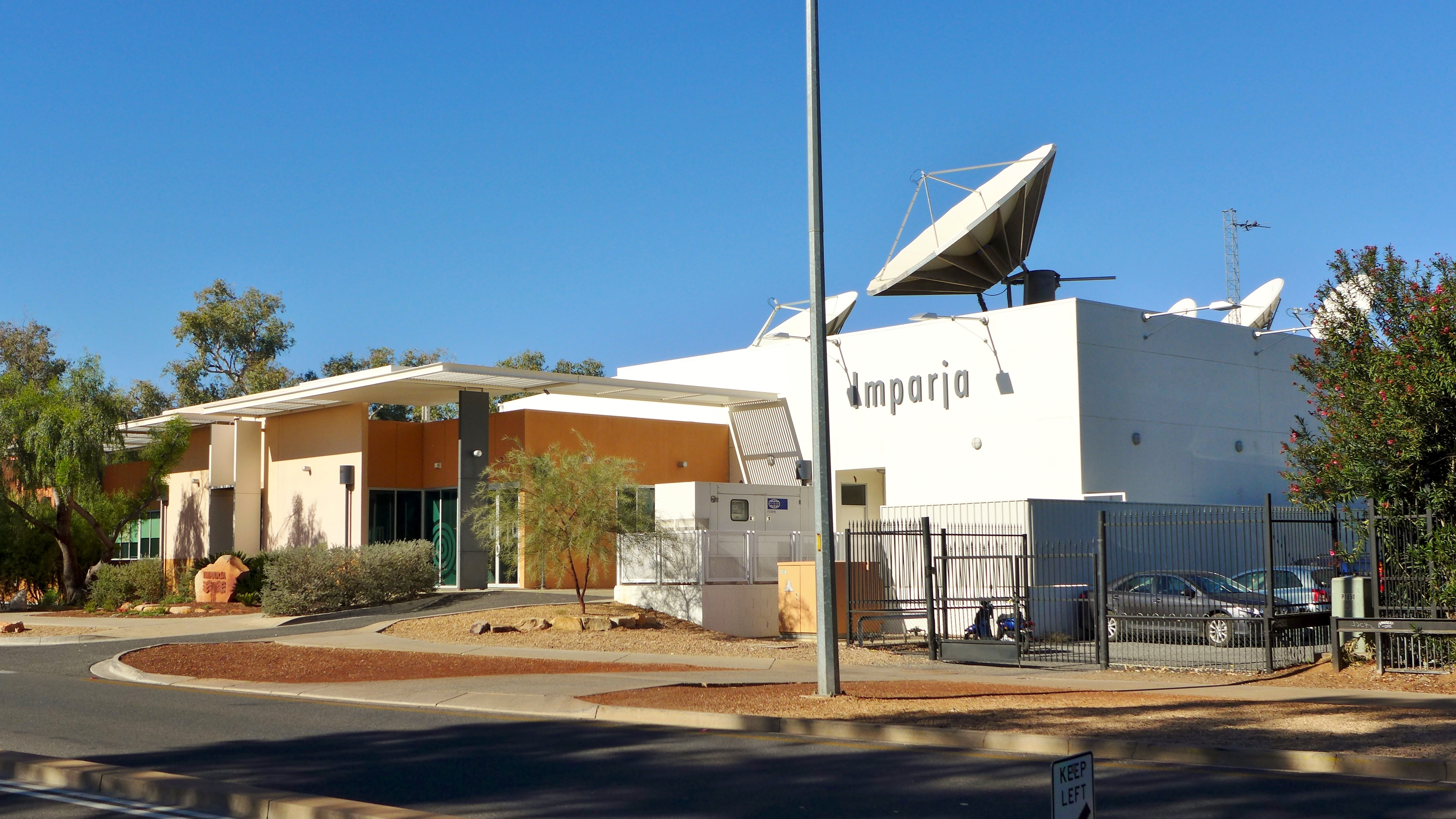
Imparja Television studios

Alice Springs is served by both local and national radio and television services. The government-owned ABC provides five broadcast radio stations; local radio ABC Alice Springs and the national networks ABC Radio National, ABC News Radio, ABC Classic and Triple J. The national Christian radio network Vision Radio broadcasts on 88.0 FM.

Commercial radio stations are 8HA 900 kHz, Sun 96.9 MHz and Gold 98.7 MHz. The sports station TAB Radio can be heard on 95.9 Community radio is provided by 8CCC 102.1 and Indigenous broadcaster CAAMA Radio 100.5

Alice Springs is home to Australia's largest Indigenous media company. The Central Australian Aboriginal Media Association (CAAMA) consists of a radio station (CAAMA Radio), music recording label (CAAMA Music), television and film production company (CAAMA Productions) and CAAMA technical. CAAMA serves to record and promote Indigenous talent across its own radio network (one of the largest transmission footprints in the world), and through sales of CDs and screening of CAAMA movies and documentaries on national broadcasters.

Five broadcast television services operate in Alice Springs – commercial stations Imparja Television (callsign IMP-9), Seven Central (QQQ-31) and 10 Central (CDT-5), along with the Government-owned ABC TV (ABAD7) and SBS TV (SBS28). Imparja Television has a commercial agreement with the Nine Network. Seven Central is an owned and operated station of the Seven Network. 10 Central transmits programming from the 10 Network.

Imparja Television is operated from studios in Alice Springs. It has a program affiliation contract with the Nine Network. The programming schedule on Imparja is the same as Nine Darwin NTD-8 and Channel 9 Brisbane, with variations in Imparja's schedule for football, cricket, rugby league and Australian rules. The children's show Yamba's Playtime, news, regional weather, and other programs produced in Alice Springs by the station. Infomercials are shown in place of Home Shopping and other programs overnight and in some daytime timeslots. NITV is broadcast on the second channel allocated to Imparja by the Federal Government.

Indigenous community TV station ICTV is also broadcast in Alice Springs as retransmitted on digital channel 37.

From June 2020 until August 2023 no local newspaper was published in Alice Springs, following the closure of the Centralian Advocate after 76 years of publication. The rival Alice Springs News ceased being printed in 2011, but continues publishing occasional articles online and maintains an article archive. In June 2023 the Today News Group announced it would start publishing a new weekly newspaper serving Alice Springs, and on 31 August 2023 the inaugural edition of The Centralian Today was published.

== Infrastructure ==
=== Transport ===
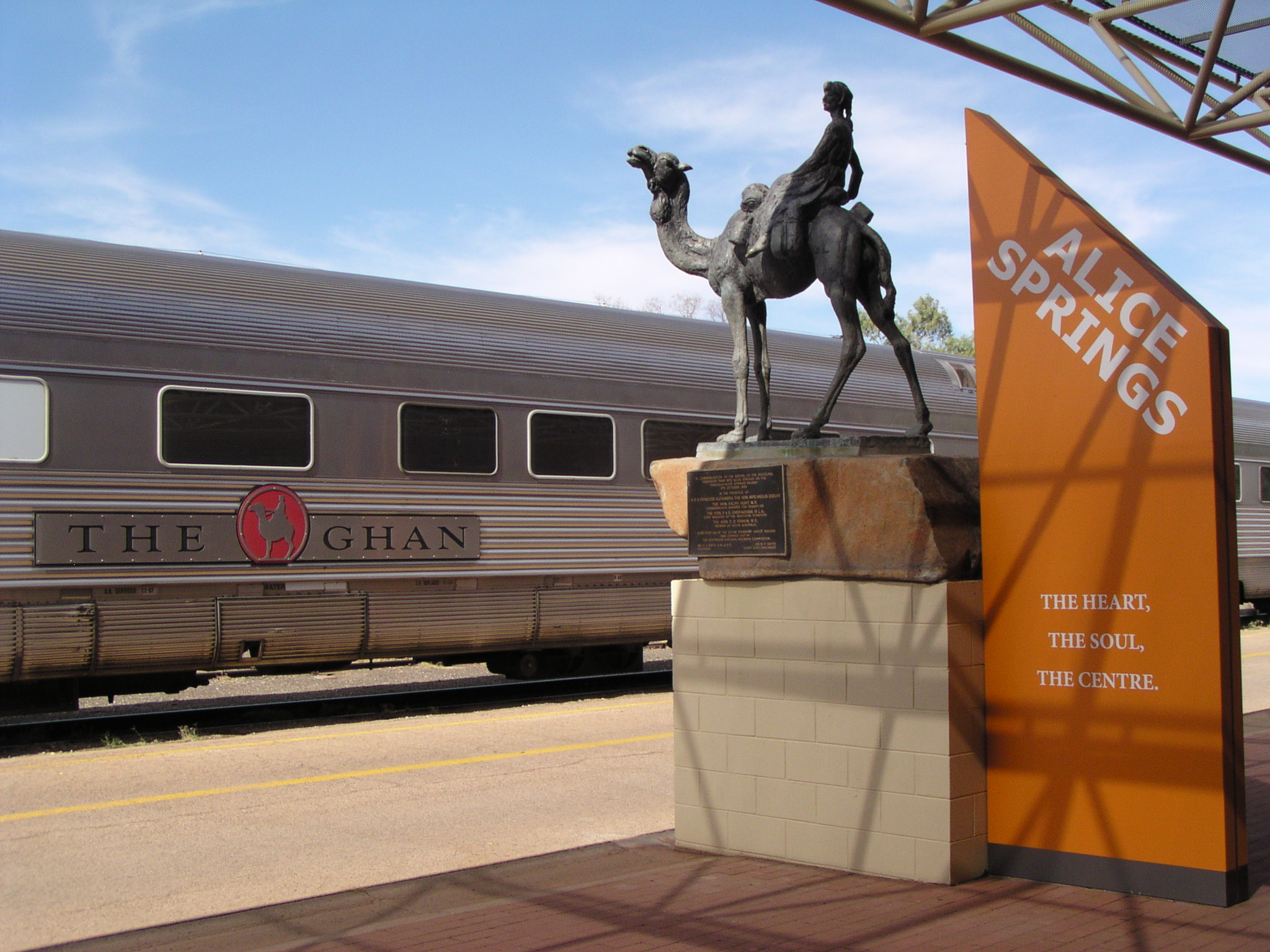
The Ghan at Alice Springs railway station

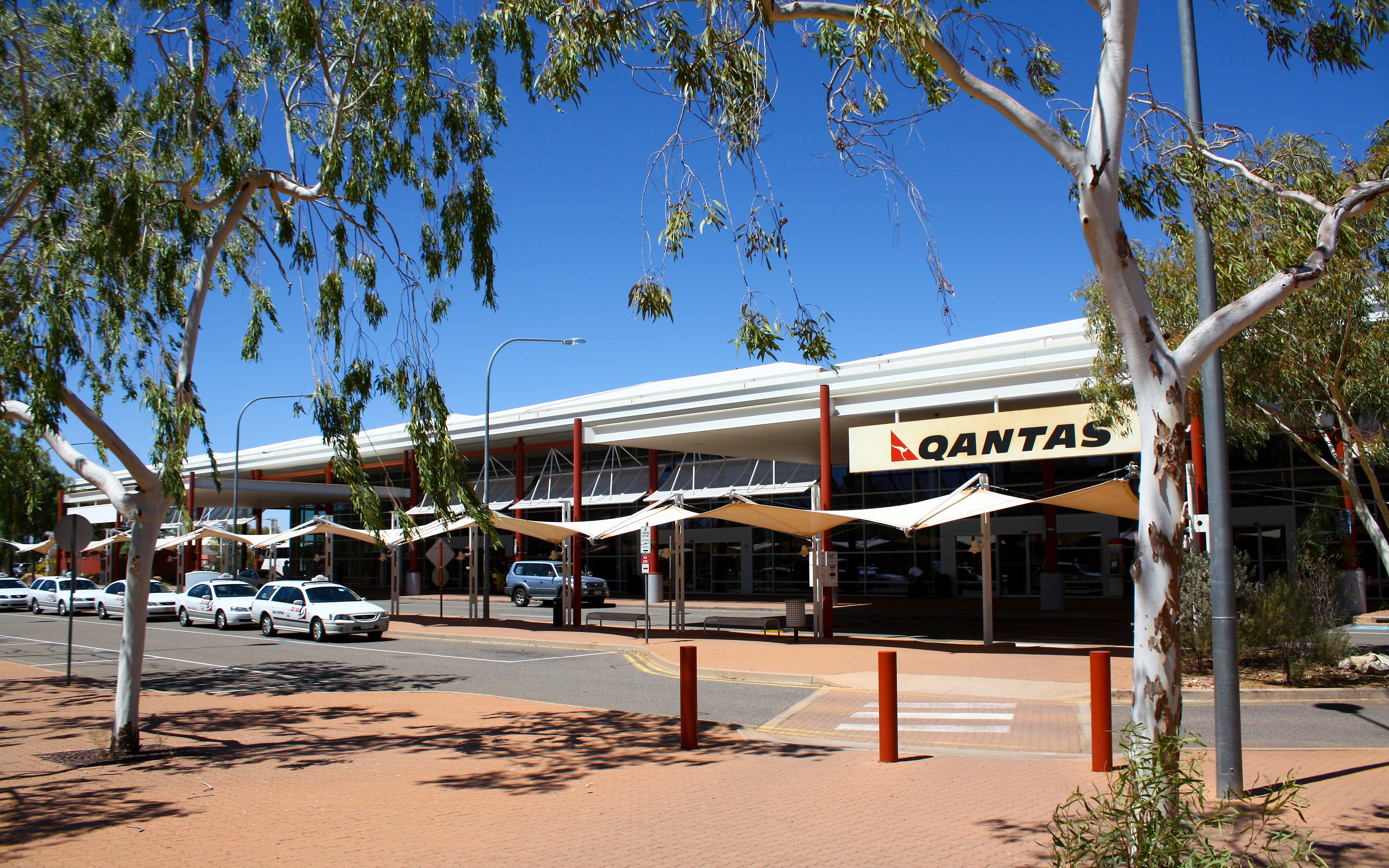
Alice Springs Airport

Alice Springs railway station is served by The Ghan on its weekly journey from Adelaide to Darwin.

The narrow gauge Central Australia Railway opened to Alice Springs in 1929. It was replaced by the present standard gauge line in 1980 which was extended to Darwin in 2004.

Greyhound Australia operate express coach services from Alice Springs to Adelaide and Darwin. Local bus services are operated by CDC Northern Territory.

The Stuart Highway, running north from Adelaide to Darwin via Alice Springs, is Northern Territory's most important road. The distance from Alice Springs to Adelaide is 1,530 kilometres (950 mi) and to Darwin is 1,498 kilometres (931 mi).

Flights from Alice Springs Airport to Adelaide, Brisbane, Darwin, Melbourne and Sydney are operated by Airnorth, Alliance Airlines, Qantas and Virgin Australia.

Alice Springs is a base for the Royal Flying Doctor Service.

== Sister cities ==
- Paghman, Afghanistan, since January 2005

== See also ==
- Adelaide House (Alice Springs)
- Alice Springs Correctional Centre
- Alice Springs Juvenile Holding Centre
- Joint Geological and Geophysical Research Station
- Kings Canyon (Northern Territory)
- National Pioneer Women's Hall of Fame
- Pioneer Theatre
- St. Mary's Hostel (Alice Springs)
- Stuart Arms Hotel
- Stuart Town Gaol
- The Bungalow
- The Residency
- Totem Theatre
- List of films and TV series shot in Alice Springs
- Crying Out Love, in the Center of the World—Japanese film using Alice Springs as a location
- Suburbs of Alice Springs
