= Adelaide House (Alice Springs) =

Museum and former hospital in Australia

Coordinates: 23°41′58″S 133°52′57″E

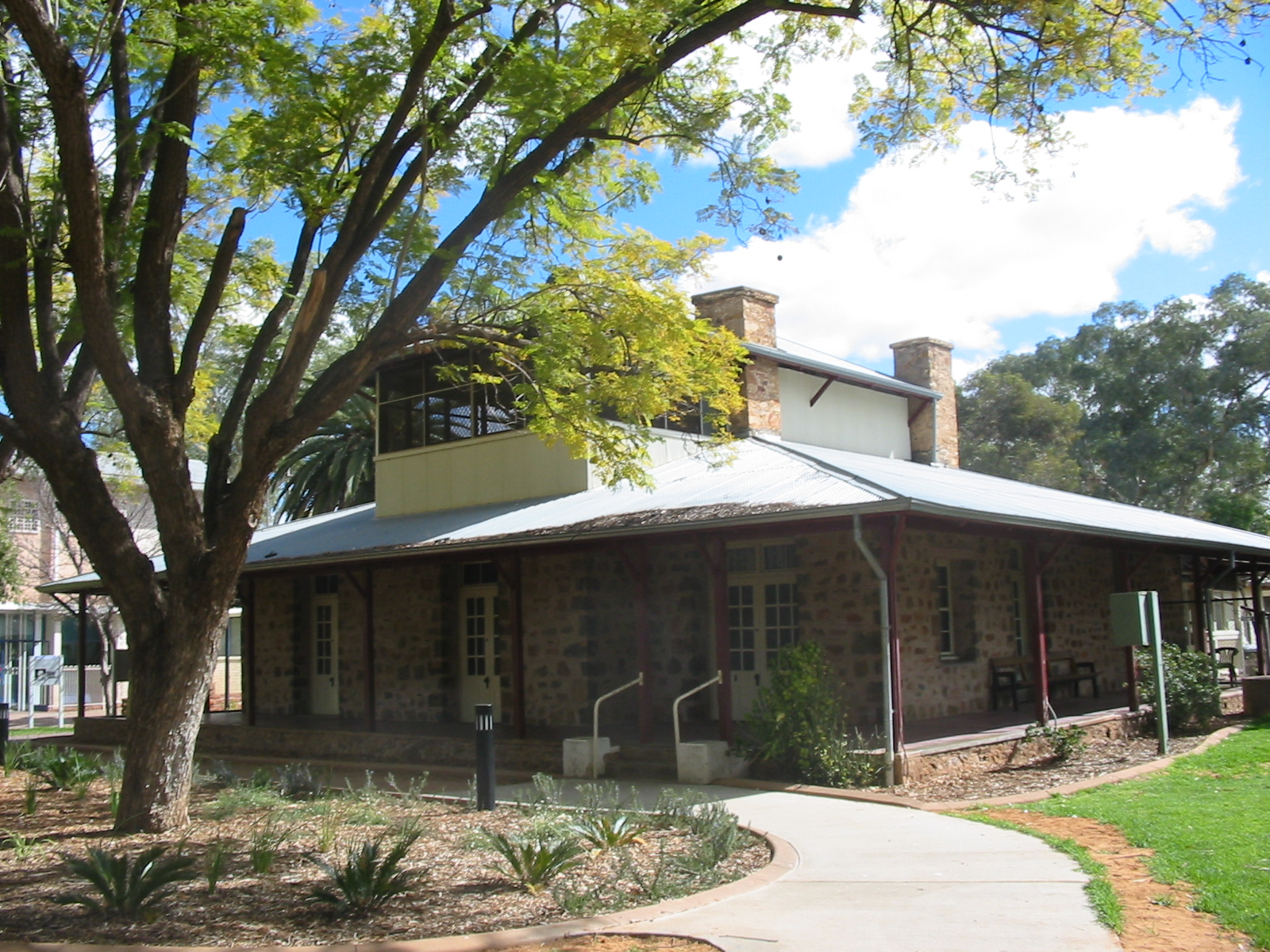
Adelaide House, Alice Springs

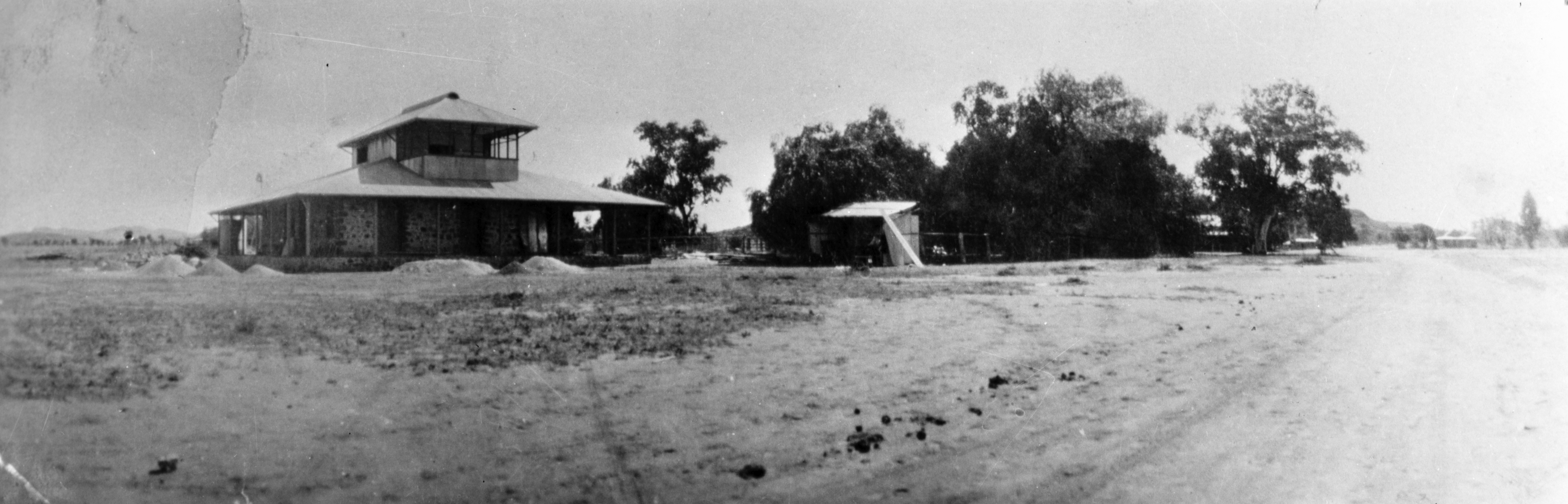
Adelaide House, while under construction. c. 1926

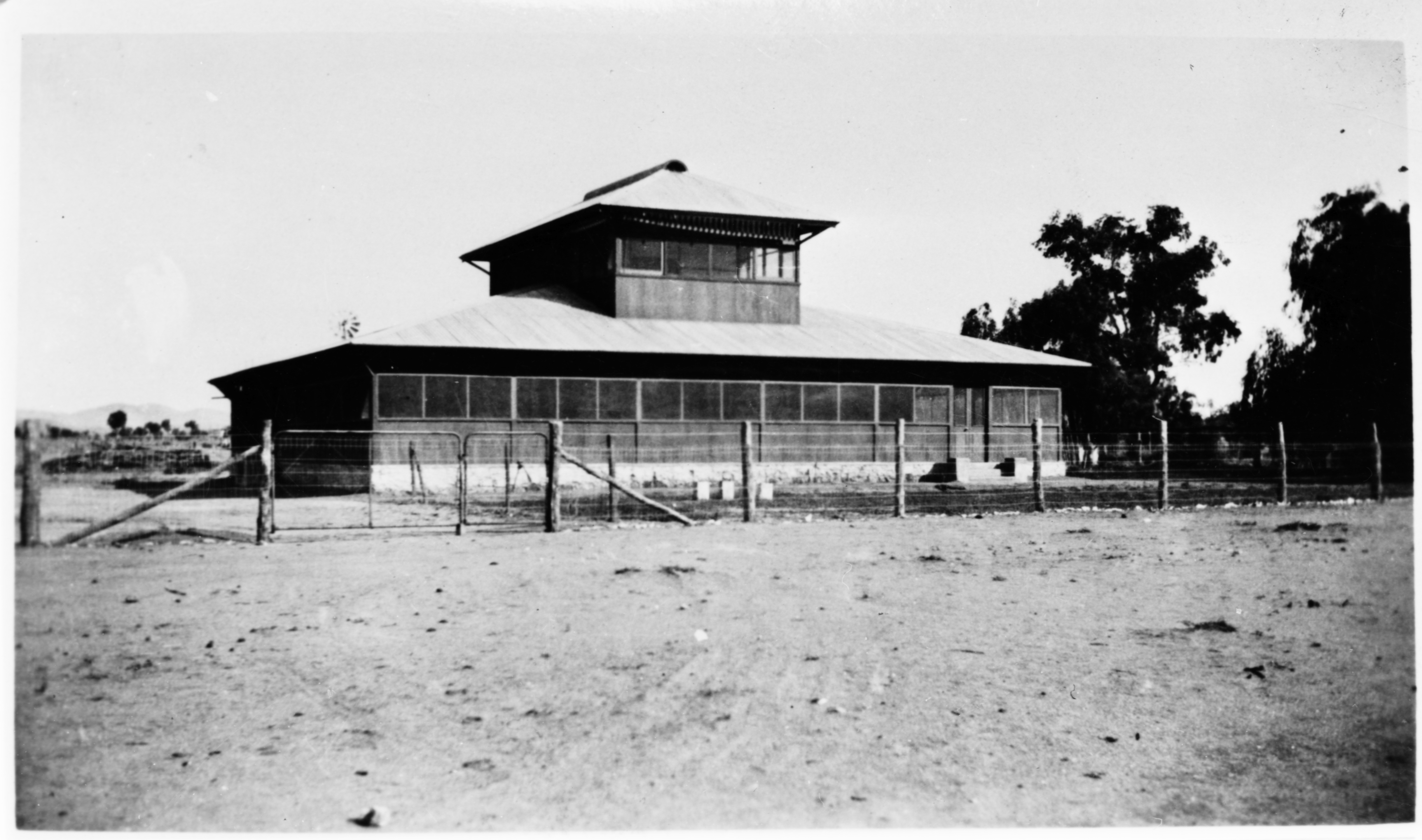
Adelaide House soon after construction

Adelaide House also known as Australian Inland Mission Hostel on the Todd Mall in Alice Springs (formerly Stuart) was the first purpose built hospital to a design by the Reverend John Flynn and was completed in 1926. It now operates as a museum managed by Heritage Alice Springs Incorporated.

== History ==
Adelaide House was the first hospital in Alice Springs and it was brought about through the hard work and advocacy of the Reverend John Flynn.

The Reverend John Flynn (Flynn) travelled regularly to Alice Springs and other remote places. As part of his role as superintendent of the Australian Inland Mission (AIM), where he started in 1912, he was determined to improve the lives of people in Central Australia.

Before Adelaide House was built there was no doctor in the region and people had to rely on their own experience and basic supplies in case of general illness. In cases of emergency, a doctor would be called in to the Central Telegraph Office in Adelaide and their advice would be transmitted via telegram. This, of course, lead to many preventable deaths.

Fundraising started for the hospital in 1918, with Flynn "passing around the hat" and with local residents forming a fundraising committee. It is worth noting that Flynn prioritized the building of a hospital over that of a church.

Construction started in 1920 when local stonemason Jack Williams (who had built the Stuart Town Gaol), who was 70 years old was given the contract. Williams struggled with the contract as he found it hard to find good help and worked alone for most of the three years he worked on the project. In 1923 construction stalled when the cost was blowing out and there were no more available funds.

With further funds raised construction restarted in 1925 when Flynn hired Bert and Angus McLeod from Adelaide and it was completed and opened on 24 June 1926.

Once completed, Adelaide House was the 9th in a network of 14 medical facilities established by the AIM and they were an important part of the "mantle of safety" Flynn envisioned for the people of the outback.

In February 1934 the government decided they would no longer allow Aboriginal people to use Adelaide House and a galvanized-iron hut was built on the east bank of the Todd River; this became known as the "blacks' hospital". The area surrounding this shed became a gazetted camping ground for Aboriginal people who had permission to be in town (see: A colonial chronology of Alice Springs for further information about prohibited areas). This 'hospital' was under the charge of Tom Taylor, a white pensioner with no evidence of medical training.

A new, much bigger hospital was officially opened in 1939 and, from 1938 Adelaide House stopped working as a hospital but remained in use by the AIM as accommodation for children from remote areas whose parents were in hospital and as pre and post-birth care for women and their children. There was, however, a break in this activity as, in World War II, along with a number of other buildings around town, it was commandeered by the army and it accommodated sisters of the Australian Army Nursing Service.

In 1952, following the death of the Reverend John Flynn, the Board of the AIM announced plans to close the hostel, these plans were strongly objected to by all of those involved in the operation of the Hostel. These included objections by the Reverend Kingsley 'Skipper' Partridge who resigned over the decision. Despite this the hostel did remain open, after an apparent change of heart of the AIM Board, and was kept running, on a volunteer basis by Jean Flynn (the widow of John Flynn) and the Reverend and Mrs. Mackay. It continued to operate until 1961.

From 1961 to 1980 the building was used by the Uniting Church for a variety of purposes including as a Manse, a meeting place and Sunday school. The AIM Hostel closed in 1961.

== Design ==
Flynn designed the Adelaide House to feature a cellar with ducts taking cool air up to the upper levels; it was a unique cooling system based upon the Coolgardie safe.

== Current use ==
In 1980 the building was listed by the National Trust (Northern Territory). Adelaide House now operates as a local history museum, run by volunteers, and it has a focus on health in Central Australia.
