= Araluen Cultural Precinct =

Cultural centre in Alice Springs in the Northern Territory, Australia

Coordinates: 23°42′06″S 133°51′45″E

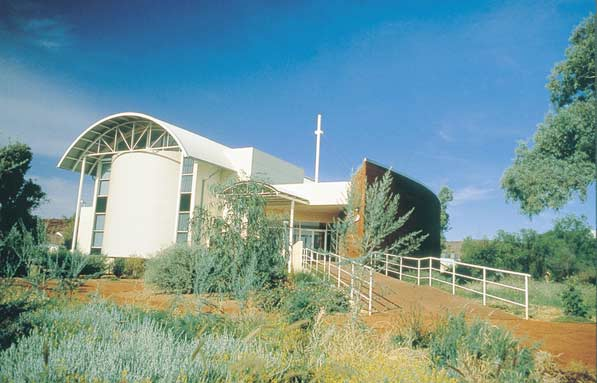
The Museum of Central Australia which sits within the precinct, 2007

The Araluen Cultural Precinct, formerly the Araluen Centre for Arts & Entertainment, in Alice Springs (Mparntwe) in the Northern Territory of Australia, is a cultural precinct which includes the Araluen Arts Centre, the Museum of Central Australia (incorporating the Strehlow Research Centre), Central Australian Aviation Museum, Kookaburra Memorial, the Yeperenye Sculpture, Central Craft, Yaye's Cafe and Aboriginal sacred sites.

== Art centre ==
The Araluen Arts Centre features four art galleries (including the Albert Namatjira Gallery) and a significant collection of art from across the region. Each year it holds Central Australia's largest First Nations art event, Desert Mob. Live performances of drama, dance and music as well as international and independent movies are shown in the theatre, which seats about five hundred people.

The front window to the arts portion of the centre is a massive, locally made, stained glass work of art which was designed by Wenten Rubuntja and based on his painting Arrernte Country (1987).

Artists whose work has regularly been exhibited at the Araluen Centre include Daisy Jugadai Napaltjarri.

== Other components ==
The Museum of Central Australia incorporates the Strehlow Research Centre for Aboriginal Culture, and displays many locally found minerals, describes geologic formations of the area.

Nearby is the Central Australian Aviation Museum, with planes and radio equipment, which is also home to the local ham radio group.

The Yeprenye Sculpture celebrates the Yeprenye (Ayepe-arenye) Caterpillar Dreaming which is a major Tjukurpa for the Arrernte people of Mparntwe. It was constructed by metal sculptor Dan Murphy who was assisted in its construction by students from the Centre for Appropriate Technology (Australia).

Central Craft is a crafts centre with a contemporary crafts shop and gallery, complete with ceramics, stained glass, painting and fabric-working workshops on site. Travelling art displays are a frequent attraction and celebrations, such as the annual Beanie Festival, are also held there.
