= William Garnet South =

Australian police officer (1855–1923)

William Garnet South (8 August 1855 – 27 May 1923) was an Australian police officer in Alice Springs and Chief Protector of Aborigines. He was also, for a short period, proprietor of the Stuart Arms Hotel in Alice Springs.

== Early life ==
South was born on 8 August 1855 at Dry Creek, in Modbury, South Australia and is one of the ten children of Henry and Margaret South who had a farm in the area.

He was educated at the local school at Modbury, established by Scottish Presbyterians.

== Career as a police officer ==
On 27 July 1877 South joined the South Australian mounted police force where he served in Melrose, Blinman, Farina, Barrows Creek and Port Augusta, Yarrowie and Peake before his 1888 appointment to Alice Springs, which was then known as Stuart.

South was one of the first police officers appointed in Alice Springs and he served as the officer-in-charge and warden for the Gold Mining District. As a part of this role, at the time based at the Heavitree Gap Police Station, South formed acquaintances with and was respected by Francis Gillen, Baldwin Spencer and Edward Stirling; all of whom were leaders in their fields.

South is remembered to have a greater consideration for Aboriginal people than many of his fellow policeman and was involved in the arrest and prosecution of William Willshire. Willshire was the first police officer in Australia to be charged for murder for the shooting of two Aboriginal men, Roger and Donkey, at Tempe Downs Station in 1891 and South assisted Gillen in his investigation of the deaths. In this investigation South went as far as questioning Willshire's sanity. South also gave evidence in the 1913 Royal Commission on the Aborigines, which was called for by Gillen, which related to these, and similar, murders in this period

South is also credited for preventing early European settlers to Central Australia from cutting down River red gums along the Todd River for building supplies; for this Stuart Traynor credits him as being "the town's first greenie".

In 1895 South was removed from his position in Alice Springs because of his involvement in the Stuart Arms Hotel and investment in mining shares: there were also accusations of poddy dodging, the theft of unbranded cattle, the charges about which were dismissed by the magistrates court as being unproved.

Following his move from Alice Springs South was stationed at the police barracks in Adelaide and, in 1907, was promoted to senior constable.

== Chief Protector of Aborigines ==
South was appointed as a protector of Aborigines on 1 March 1908 and this was followed, in 1911, by promotion to chief protector of Aborigines in 1911. In this role South sought to provide shelter, food and clothing to 'full descent' Aboriginal people so that they would be "comfortable and happy for the remainder of their lives". However, he was not as giving in his attitudes towards 'half-caste' Aboriginal children who he believed should be merged in to the 'white' community and he was directly involved in removing these children from Aboriginal camps and forming part of the Stolen Generations.This action was enabled by the Aborigines Act 1911, which established his position, and made him, through his position of chief protector, the legal guardian of 'every aboriginal and half-caste child'.

South did not think this was enough and called for the Aborigines (Training of Children) Act 1923 that would enable the chief protector to remove children from the former mission stations; this was not possible with the earlier act.

South believed that the extinction of Aboriginal people was inevitable, except for those that inherited 'white blood' which he believed was stronger and "must in the end prevail".

== Later life ==
South died of heart disease, following a year long illness, on 27 May 1923, in North Adelaide and in his obituary he was described as "a staunch friend of the aborigines, one who knew their needs and habits from long association with them".

== Personal life ==
On 2 October 1882, at St. Luke's Church of England in Adelaide, South married Fanny Stevens; the couple would go on to have four children.

On 12 February 1909, following Fanny's death in 1908, South married Sophia Lalor, nee Reid, a widow with five children.
