= Charles Winnecke =

Australian explorer and botanist

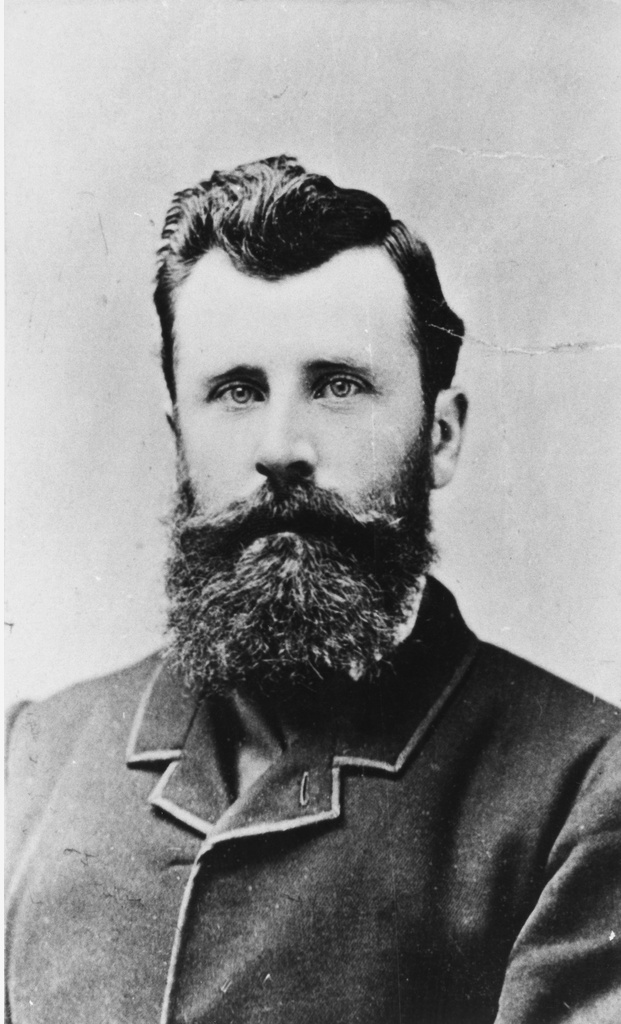

Personal details
- Born: 1856 Norwood, South Australia
- Died: 10 October 1902 (aged 45)
- Occupation: Explorer and botanist

Charles George Alexander Winnecke (18 November 1857 – 10 September 1902) was an Australian explorer and botanist best known for leading the Horn Expedition to Central Australia in 1894.

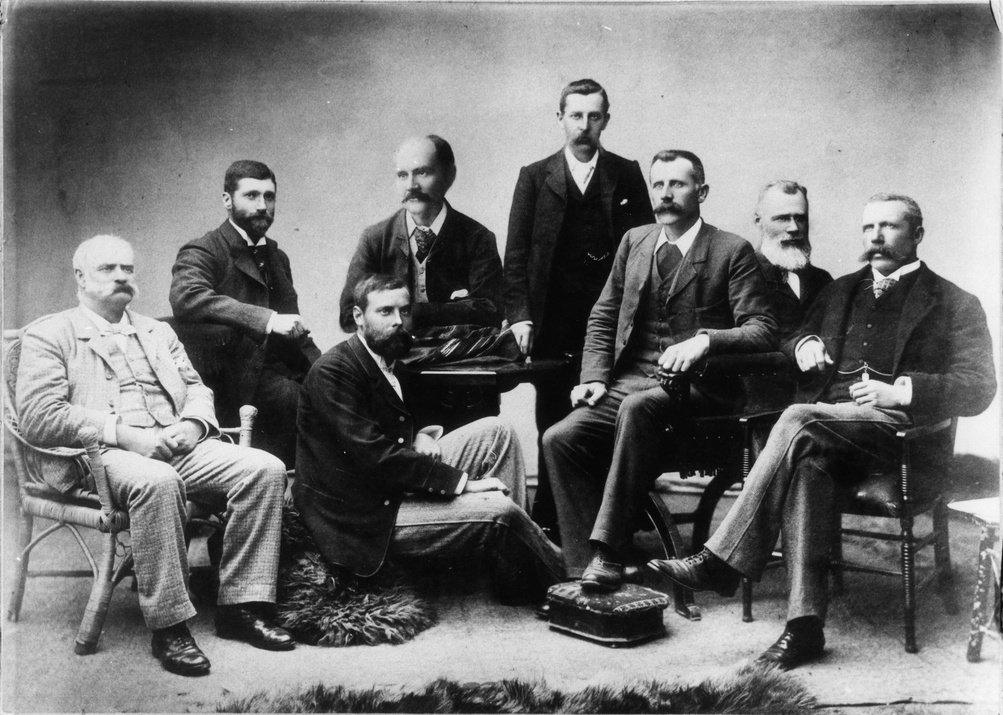
Members of the Horn Scientific Expedition (Winnecke seated third from right)

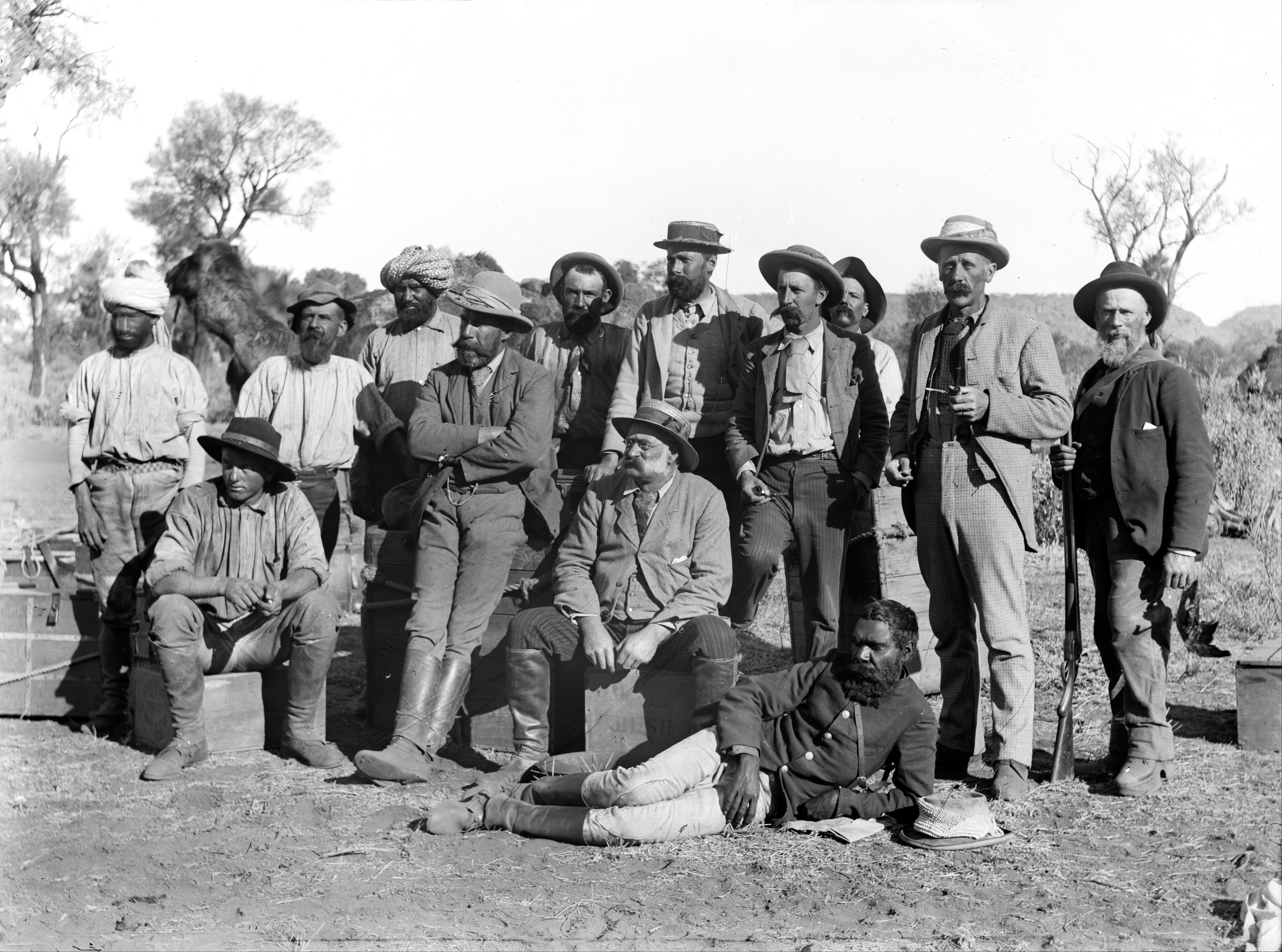
Members of the Horn Expedition in Alice Springs in 1894 (Winnecke standing, fourth from right)

== Biography ==
Winnecke was born in Norwood in South Australia on 18 November 1856. He was educated at St. Peter's College.

Winnecke entered the Government Survey Office in Adelaide in 1873 under Surveyor-General George Goyder. He first accompanied the North Eastern Exploring Expedition to survey the border between South Australia and Queensland in 1877.

Winnecke travelled through northern South Australia in September 1884. A decade later, he led the Horn Expedition to Central Australia from May to August 1894, a scientific exploration of the region's geology, zoology, botany and Indigenous people. They followed the Finke River as far as the James Range towards the now Tempe Downs Station and Kings Creek Station. It included Baldwin Spencer, Edward Charles Stirling, Ralph Tate and J. A. Watt and drew on the expertise of Afghan cameleers and Aboriginal guides. It resulted in the publication of the Report on the work of the Horn Scientific Expedition to Central Australia in four volumes from 1896 to 1897.

During this expedition, Winnecke was responsible for the theft of a major repository of Aboriginal sacred objects in Central Australia, helped by an Aboriginal guide who was later killed by local elders for his crime in leading Winnecke to their hiding place. The objects were subsequently interpreted with the assistance of another guide, the sometime police tracker and Aboriginal resistance identity Arrarbi. When removing the objects he left 'a number of tomahawks, large knives and other things in their place, sufficient commercially to make the transaction an equitable exchange'.

Winnecke was made a fellow of the Royal Geographical Society and the Royal Astronomical Society. He died on 10 September 1902 in Adelaide. (Note: There are discrepancies regarding Winnecke's date of death. The Northern Territory Dictionary of Biography lists it as 17 September 1902, but the obituaries are published prior to that date.)

== Legacy ==
Winnecke Avenue in Alice Springs is named after him.

A species of Australian lizard, Diporiphora winneckei, is named in his honour, as is the shrub Triumfetta winneckeana.

== Publications ==
- Physical features of Central Australia, 1887, Adelaide
- Journal of the Horn Scientific Exploring Expedition, 1894 Australia, 1897, Adelaide
