= Elsie May Jenkins =

Australian opal and mica miner (1887-1974)

Elsie "Ma" May Jenkins (née. Goodridge) (1887 – 9 September 1974) was an opal and mica miner who worked at Lightning Ridge and Coober Pedy in South Australia and Alice Springs in the Northern Territory of Australia. She is best known as the "Opal Queen" referencing her impressive opal collection.

== Early life ==
Born Elsie May Goodridge in Grenfell, New South Wales in 1887, Elsie was working as a circus equestrienne when she mechanic Hector Jenkins, also working in the circus as a mechanic. The pair married and together moved to Lightning Ridge in 1918 to mine opal in the area and in Coober Pedy.

== Life in the Northern Territory ==
After years of opal mining in South Australia, Elsie May and Hec relocated to Alice Springs in 1929 in search of gold. They mined mica in the Harz Ranges and sold it to the government for the war effort. Their house, ‘The Ritz’ on Parsons Street, was a hive of activity. Elsie May’s opal collection was widely regarded as one of the most impressive in the world.

When Queen Elizabeth II and the Duke of Edinburgh made a royal visit to Alice Springs in 1954, the Queen admired a piece of opal jewellery so much she asked if she could have it. When Elsie asked how she could invoice the item and was told the item was considered a gift, she nonetheless forwarded a bill to Buckingham Palace and was paid.

In 1973, the Australian Taxation Department conducted an investigation into Elsie May’s business and found she owed thousands of dollars. Her 13 original Albert Namatjira paintings and prized opal collection were auctioned at the Sydney Opera House to pay the debt, but an associate is believed to have already sold the most part of her valuable private collection overseas.

== Later life ==
In 1974 Elsie May health deteriorated and was moved to a nursing home in Adelaide. She died on 9 September. She is featured in the National Pioneer Women's Hall of Fame.
