= John Creed Lovegrove =

(1885–1954) a police officer who worked with the Northern Territory Police Force

John Creed Lovegrove (27 September 1885 – 24 December 1954) was an Australian police officer who worked for much of his career in the Northern Territory. He was officer-in-charge of the Alice Springs Police Station in Mparntwe from 1929 to 1937. In this role he was one of the most senior administrators in the region and took on a number of responsibilities including as the deputy chief inspector of Aboriginals and, later, Protector of Aborigines.

== Early life ==
Lovegrove was born at Wellington East, in South Australia, where he was the fifth child of John Duckey Lovegrove and his wife Margaret (née Mason). Little is known of his early life although, as a young man, he worked as a farm labourer.

He joined the South Australia Police Force on 1 October 1910 and for the first years of his service he relieved at police districts in Kingston, Millicent, Hergott Springs (Maree) and Frances with shorter periods of service in Adelaide and a handful of other locations.

== Life in the Northern Territory ==
On 1 October 1915 Lovegrove transferred to the Northern Territory Police Force and, in his early years there, he was stationed at remote bush stations and often carried out patrols in remote area, including within Arnhem Land.

In January 1919, while stationed at Roper River (Ngukurr), Lovegrove attempted to resign from the police force as he had been suffering from long bouts of fever, likely malaria and dengue fever, but it took time for a relieving officer to be sent and, when he was able to leave his post and took a four-month period of leave he withdrew his resignation. On his return from leave Lovegrove did request a transfer and was stationed at Newcastle Waters.

In 1924, while in Arnhem Land, Lovegrove led a search for the survivors of SS Douglas Mawson after he heard a report of two women from the sunken ship living there with the Yolngu. This search took many months and, to complete it, he undertook extensive travel by boat and on foot, however, it was later decided that the reports were an unfounded rumour.

In August 1925, when stationed at Ranken, Lovegrove married Lilian Eleanor Styles (the sister of Eileen Fitzer), who was from a prominent Northern Territory family, and they would go on to have three children together (Yvonne, Creed and Ian).

In June 1926 Lovegrove was made a police sergeant and on 8 September 1927 he requested a transfer to Alice Springs (Mparntwe) where he commenced service as sergeant-in-charge in December. As the most senior officer in the region Lovegrove filled a variety of roles there including being the mining warden, registrar of motor vehicles, health inspector, deputy chief inspector of Aboriginals (later Protector of Aborigines) and keeper of the Stuart Town Gaol. He also acted as Deputy Administrator of Central Australia for VG Carrington when he was on leave.

In 1935, during the extension of the Central Australia Railway to Alice Springs, and the associated increased workload, it was recommended by the Administrator Robert Weddell that Lovegrove be promoted to sub-inspector, however, this was not granted by the Minister in charge. On 15 September 1937 Lovegrove was transferred to Darwin where, on 1 December 1937, he was promoted to inspector.

Lovegrove retired from the police force on medical grounds and after two short periods of illness, on 12 September 1942 at the age of 57.

== Later life and death ==
After retirement Lovegrove and his family returned to Alice Springs where he served as a censor during World War II. In 1944, he and Lilian took over the management of Barrow Creek Hotel in Barrow Creek where, for the remaining year of the war, they could only sell very limited amounts of alcohol. They remained there until 1948 until they moved to Ti-Tree where they built a home.

Eventually he and Lilian returned to Alice Springs again where Lovegrove died on 24 December 1954.

== Legacy ==
The following locations in the Northern Territory are named for him:

- Lovegrove Drive in Araluen/Ciccone, suburbs of Alice Springs.
- Lovegrove Street in Ludmilla, a suburb of Darwin.
