= Heavitree Gap Police Station =

Historic building in Alice Springs, Northern Territory

Coordinates: 23°43′39″S 133°51′47″E

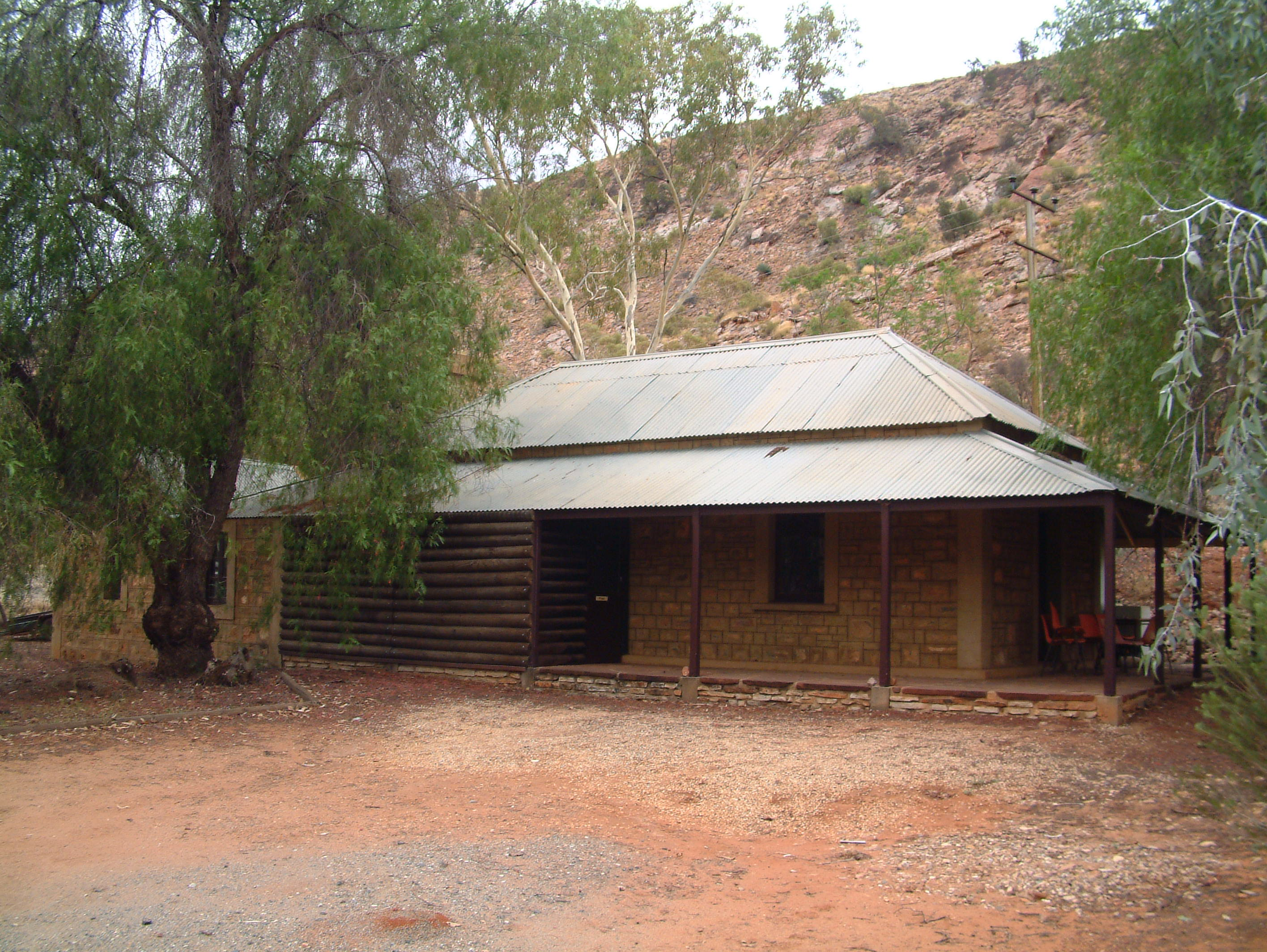
Heavitree Gap Police Station in 2005

Heavitree Gap Police Station, also known as Heavitree Gap Gaol, is a historic building within the Heavitree Gap Police Station Historical Reserve. It is located on the southwestern side of Heavitree Gap in Alice Springs in the Northern Territory of Australia.

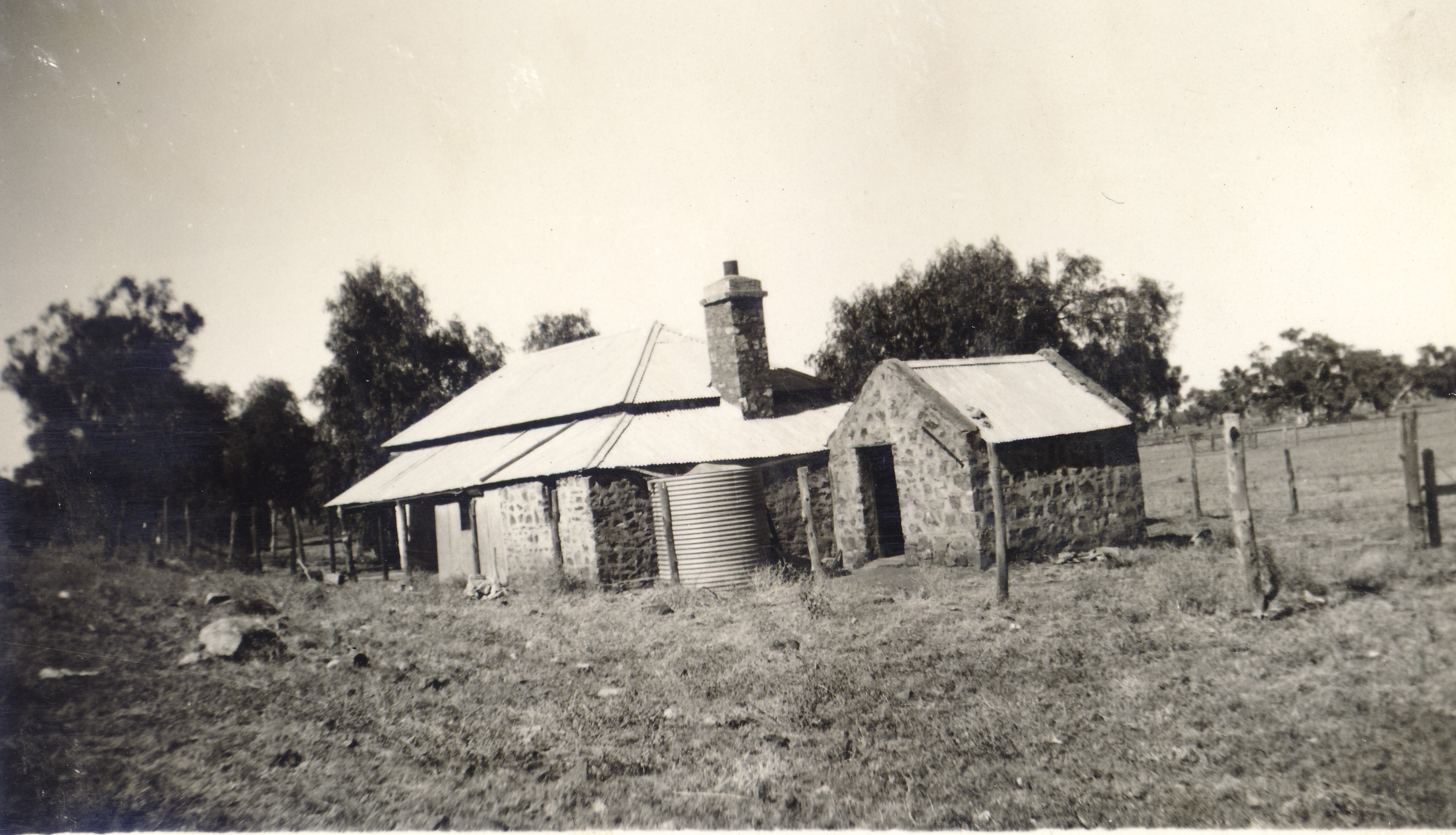
Heavitree Gap Police Station in 1940

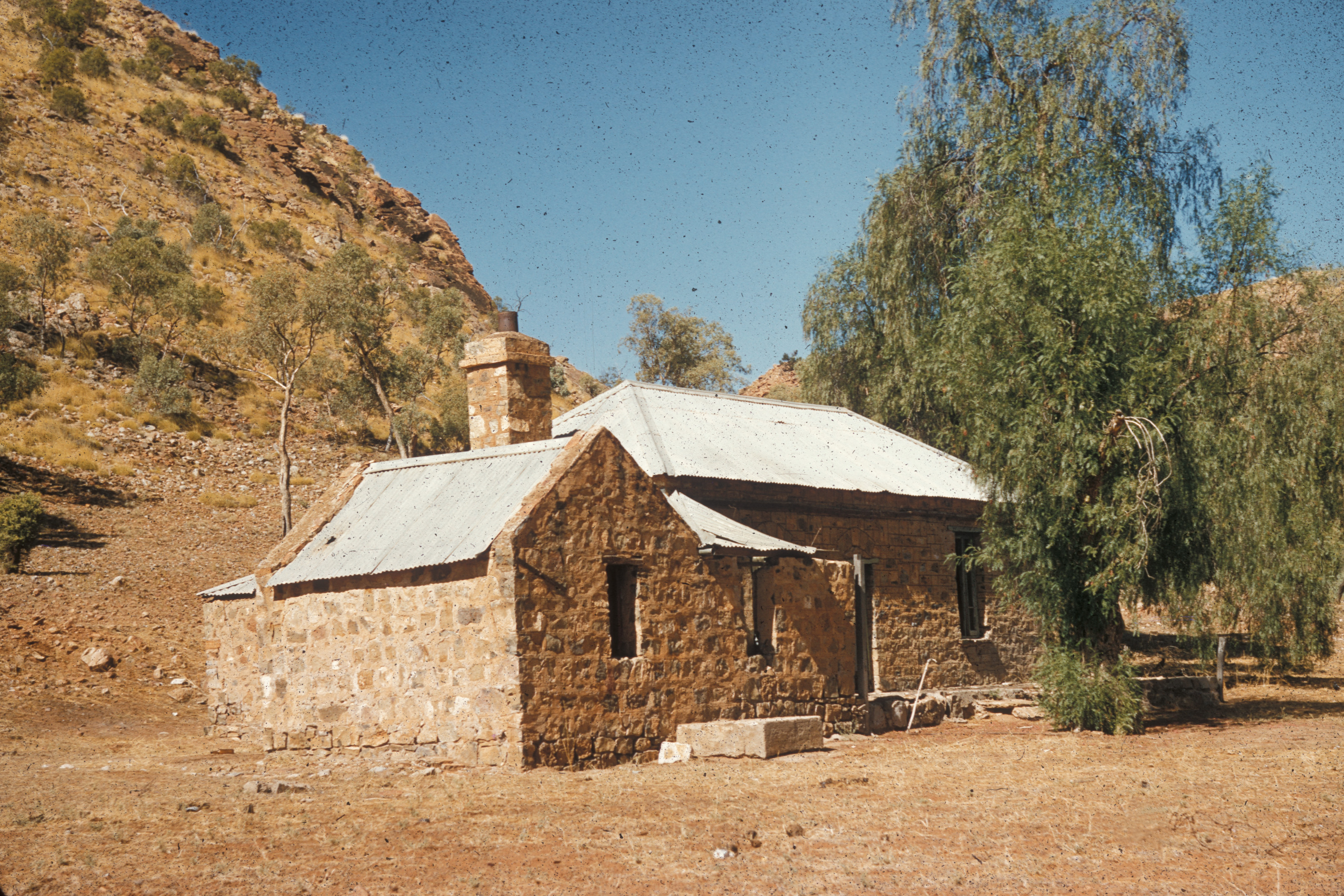
Heavitree Gap Police Station in the 1970s

== History ==
The area was declared as a conservation reserve under Section 12 of the Territory Parks and Wildlife Commission Act of 30 June 1978 based on its historic values. The reserve is significant because of its connection to early policing in Central Australia, European settlement and early frontier contact between Aboriginal and European people.

The first police camp in Alice Springs was established in 1879 at the Alice Springs Telegraph Station and on 21 April 1886 was moved to the Heavitree Gap site by Mounted Constables William Wilshire and Erwein Wurmbrand and several members of the Australian native police. Here it became the first permanently established police presence in central Australia.

Another officer that was based there, from 1888 to 1895 was William Garnet South.

The stone station was constructed in 1889 and, before then, the police officers were accommodated in tents and other temporary dwellings while prisoners were held in a bough shed which, later, was upgraded to being a log hut.

In 1904, the buildings were officially proclaimed to be a public gaol under the Prison Act 1869 and its first prisoners were eight Arrernte men from Ntaria (Hermansburg) who were convicted of ‘larceny of beef’, meaning that they had killed cattle. Two of these prisoners were juveniles, only 14 and 16, and they served 14 days of hard labour and received 20 lashes. After they were release the remaining men, who had been sentenced to six months, all escaped on 1 December 1905 and were not located until 25 December 1905 and, following their recapture, they were each released in January and February 1906.

The gaol was closed in 1909 following the construction of the purpose built Stuart Town Gaol and the move of the prisoners to there. At this time the police station also moved into the township and, despite initially planning to demolish it, the old station was kept as housing for the junior constables and was were the police's camels and horses (which were used for patrols) were kept. It is unclear how long this remained the case but, by the 1920s until the mind-1930s it was being used by the districts stock inspector and was later used as a ration depot.

Notably, in the late-1930s nurse Eileen Fitzer, alongside two teenage assistants from The Bungalow, isolated there with 17 mostly Aboriginal children who were suffering from trachoma. While there she also treated approximately 100 adults but they visited for treatment and did not stay there.

The condition of the site had deteriorated by the early 1960s and in 1967 work was undertaken to reconstruct it.

It was listed on the Northern Territory Heritage Register on 15 February 1994.
