= Damoe-Ra Park =

Park in Darwin, Northern Territory, Australia

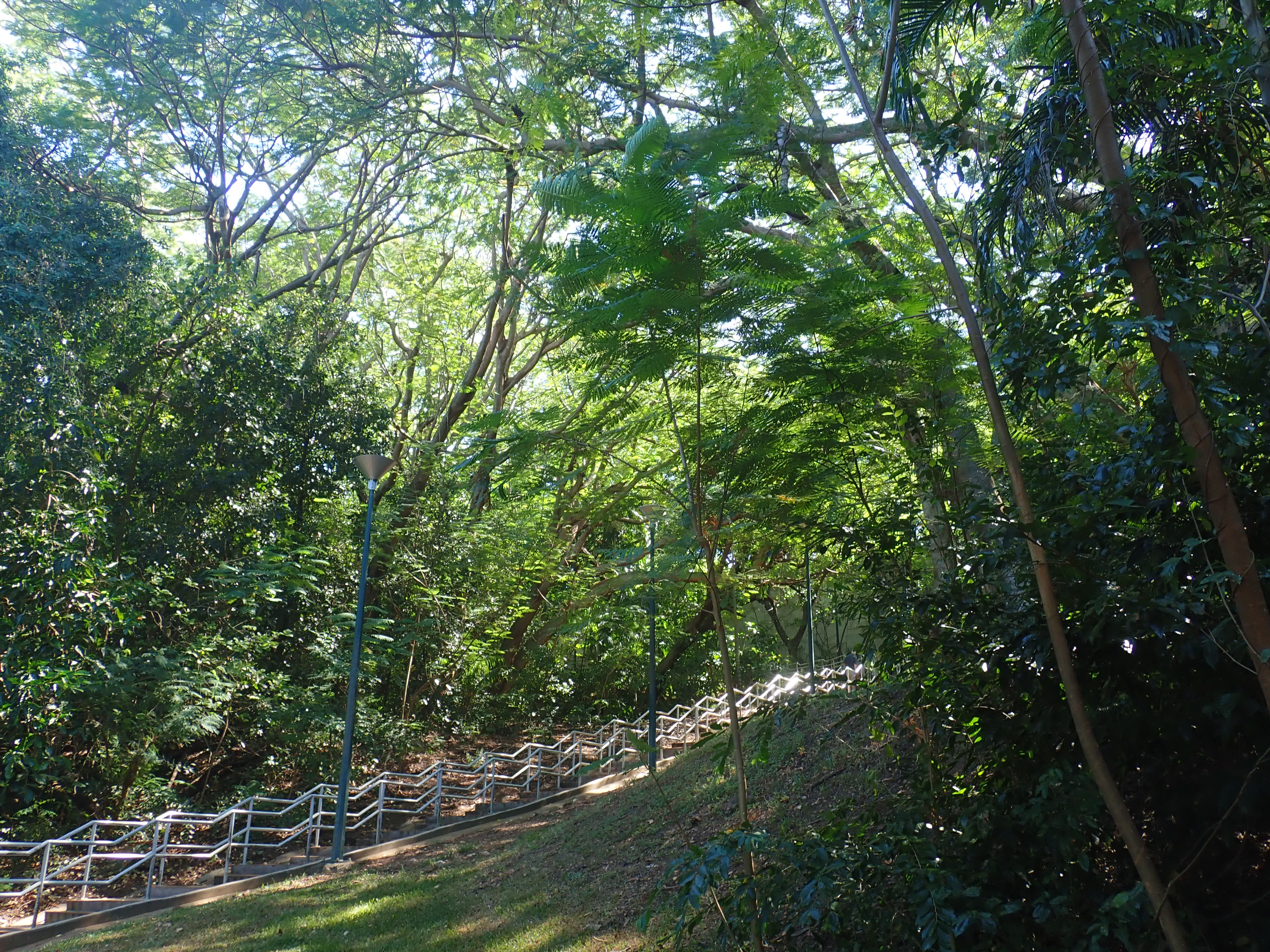
- Steps to the Esplanade from Damoe-Ra Park
- Interactive map of Damoe-Ra Park
- Location: Darwin, Northern Territory
- Coordinates: 12°28′01.5″S 130°50′31.5″E
- Designated: 20 March 1996

Damoe-Ra Park is an urban park in Darwin, Northern Territory, designated in 1996. The park was named Damoe-Ra because the park includes a spring sacred to the Larrakia women, and Damoe-Ra is the Larrakia word meaning "eye" or "spring". The park is situated below the escarpment on the coast below the Parliament House. The garden itself, together with its memorial pathway, plaques, and mosaic honours the women of the Northern Territory.

Amongst the women honoured are some who had been awarded a Tribute to Northern Territory Award:

2006	Olive Pink
2006	Emma Tantengco
2006	Djapirri Mununggirritj
2006	Nellie Camfoo
2006	Jessie Litchfield
2005	Nancy Giese
2005	Sylvia Wolf
2005	Helena Rioli
2005	Janie Mason
2005	Margery Harris
2004	Lana Quall
2004	Joyce Chin
2004	Olive Veverbrants
2004	Philomena Hali
2004	Norma Grant
2004	Poppy Secrett
2004	Barbara Cummings
2004	Helen Liddy
2004	Fele Mann
2003	Barbara James
2003	Lily Ah Toy
2003	Mayse Young
2003	Eileen Fitzer
2003	Natalie Harwood
2003	Dawn Lawrie
2003	Phoebe Farrar
2003	Jose Petrick
2003	Phoebe Doreen Lee
2003	Eileen Cummings
2003	Cynthia Molina
2003	Cristina Black
