= Her Majesty's Gaol and Labour Prison, Alice Springs =

Prison in Northern Territory, Australia (1938–1996)

Coordinates: 23.7031°S 133.8770°E

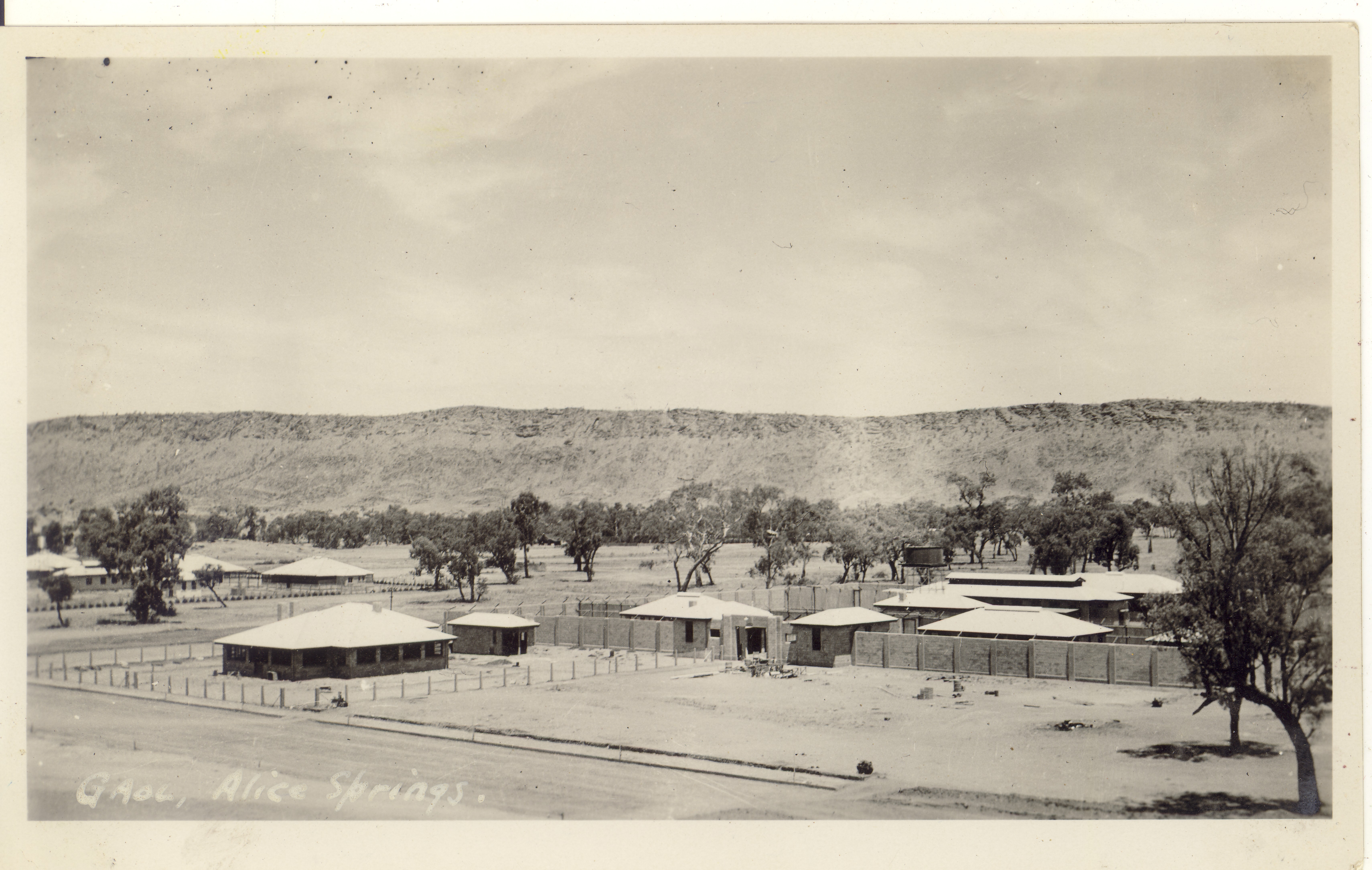
The gaol soon after construction, as seen from Billy Goat Hill, Alice Springs, c 1938

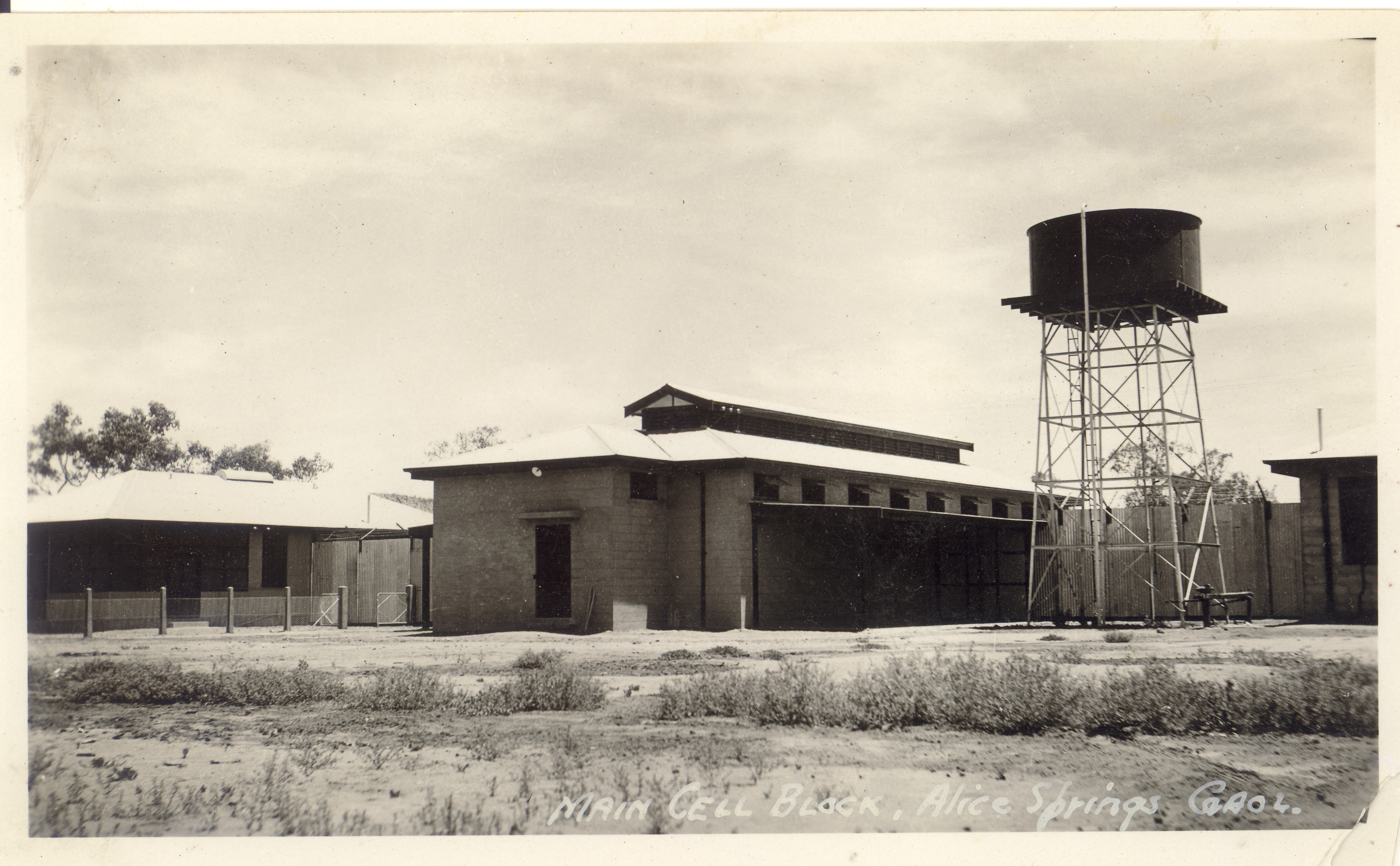
The main cell block, c 1938

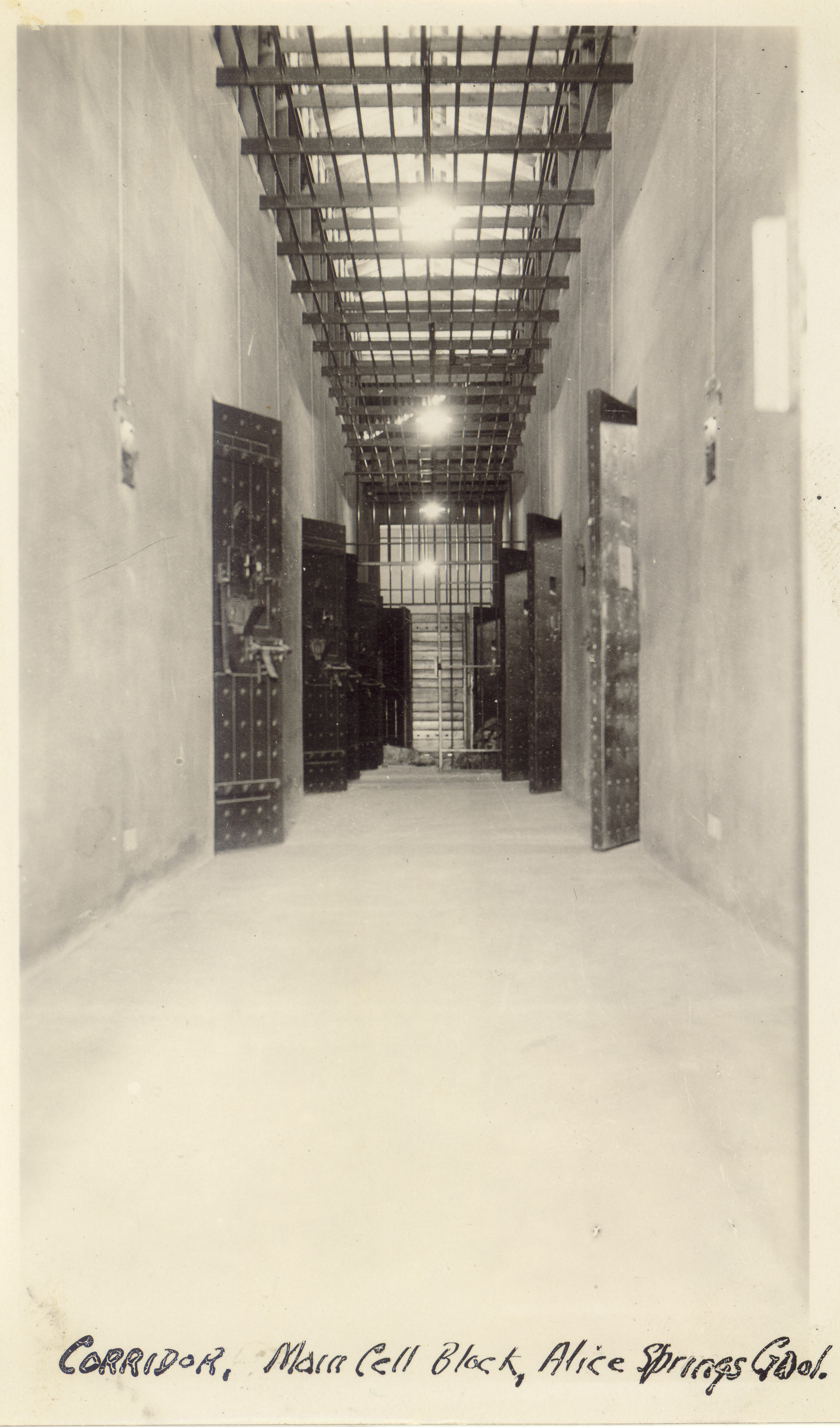
The corridor of the main cell block, c 1938

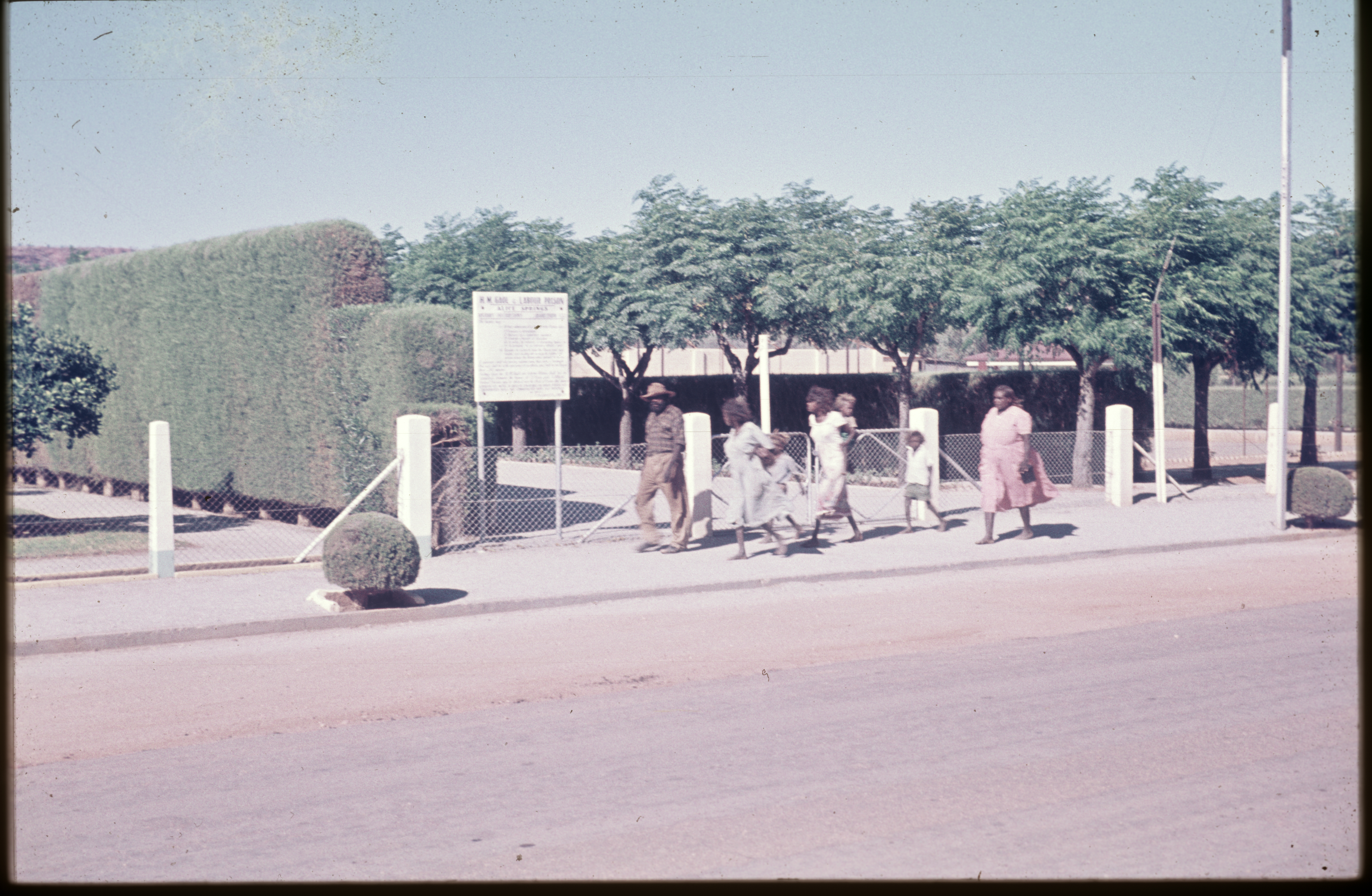
Aboriginal family outside the Stuart Terrace gaol, Alice Springs in 1957 or 1958

Her Majesty's Gaol and Labour Prison was a government run prison in Alice Springs in the Northern Territory which operated between 1938 and 1996. It was preceded by Stuart Town Gaol and replaced by the still operating Alice Springs Correctional Centre.

It is now the location of the Women's Museum of Australia.

== History ==
Builders began work on the gaol in 1936 and was the replacement for the, significantly smaller, Stuart Town Gaol and it was designed by CE Davies who displayed an understanding of arid zone principles. It was opened in November 1938 and housed men and women; until 1964 male prisoners were segregated by race. The gaol was originally designed to house 22 prisoners and prisoners sentenced to longer sentences were regularly transferred to Fannie Bay Gaol or prisons in South Australia.

The first Warden, also called Keeper, of the gaol was Philip Francis (Phil) Muldoon who was a long serving Northern Territory police officer; he was appointed by the then Administrator Aubrey Abbott. He worked there alongside his wife, Bertilla Muldoon, who was the de facto (unpaid) matron and also cared for the female prisoners. During the Muldoons' management, the gaol was neatly maintained with substantial vegetable, fruit and flower gardens. It also had an ant-bed tennis court constructed by Phil Muldoon.

For this reason it gained the nicknames 'Vatican City' (in reference to their Catholicism) and 'Muldoon's Guest House'. The prisoners often called it Greenbush and this name is still in use by the Greenbush Art Group which operates from the Alice Springs Correctional Centre in partnership with Batchelor Institute of Indigenous Tertiary Education. Phil Muldoon left the role when he retired in 1958.

During World War II one of the women's call blocks, with had been set aside for 'European' women (non-Aboriginal) women was acquired by the Army for military prisoners including, for two months, German and Italian internees; they were then transferred to Tatura, Victoria. Also during World War II the gaol was the only correction facility in the Northern Territory from 1942 until the end of the war during the Bombing of Darwin.

One famous former prisoner is Olive Pink who, after being denied an inspection, intentionally entered an Aboriginal Reserve (without permission) so that she would be arrested. She was found guilty in court and was required to pay a fine or spent 5 days in prison. She was furious when the Warden Phil Muldoon paid her fine rather than have her in the gaol. Albert Namatjira also spent a number of night there before being transferred to serve his sentence in Papunya; after his death a protest camp of approximately 250 people camped at the gates of the gaol.

In 1956 Telka Williams began working in the women's section and worked there until her retirement in 1984. Telka Williams, who was an advocate for disability care in the Northern Territory, spoke out about the imprisonment of 'mental defectives' within the prison and said:

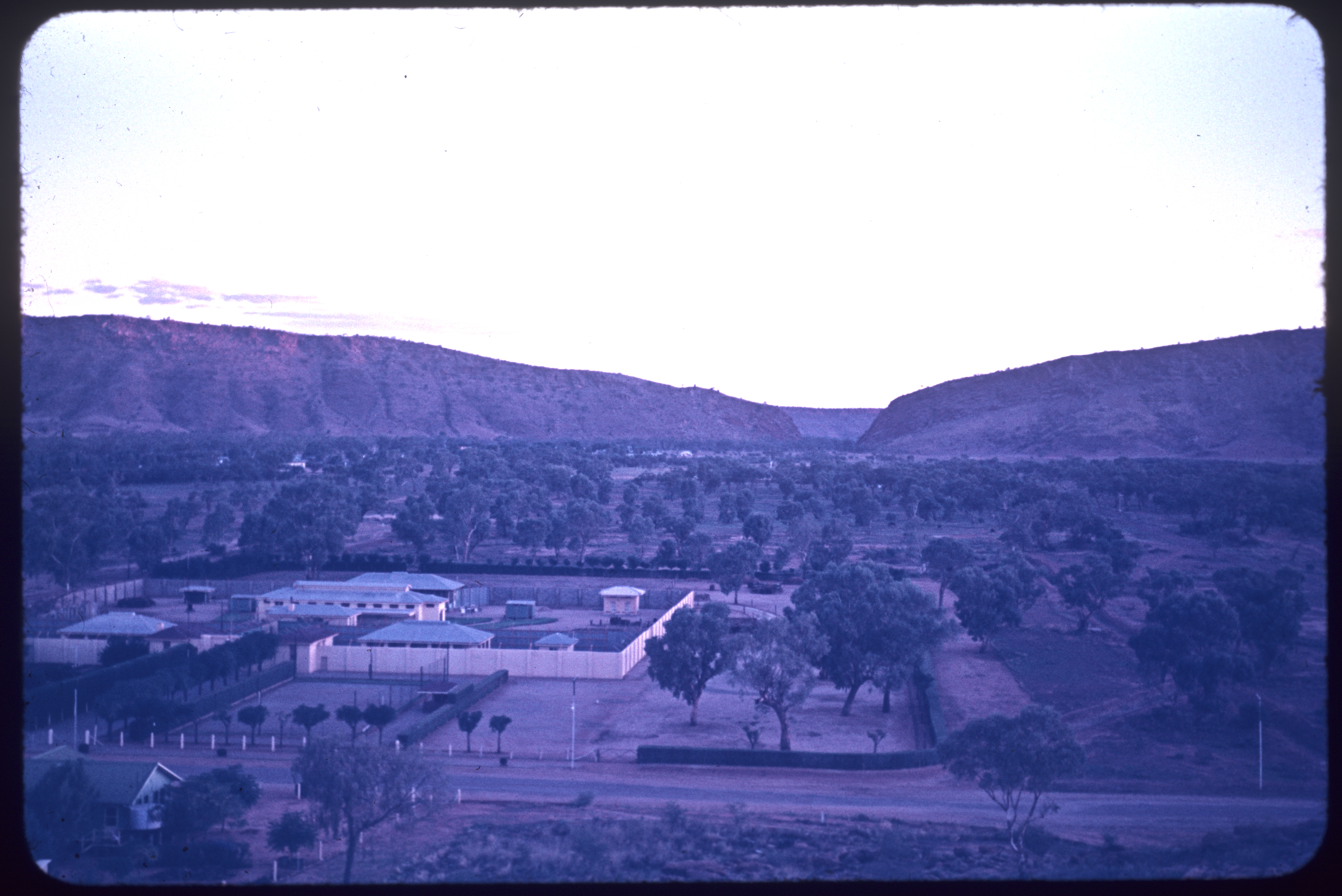
View of the Gaol from Billy Goat Hill in 1957 or 1958

Before the psychiatric ward was built at the hospital - for their (mental defectives) own sake and the community's safety - the only place for them was gaol, where they were secure. It was very, very sad because staff were not trained in psychiatric nursing. Some of [the inmates] were quite violent, as you would understand. Others were personal friends of mine, which was a little hard to deal with.

— Telka Williams, Transcript of interview with Telka Williams, interview with Megg Kelham, LANT NTRS 226 TS 1243

Telka Williams husband, Joseph (Taffy) Williams, who was Superintendent of the gaol during some of the period Telka worked there called it a "black mark on the administration in the Northern Territory".

Prisoner numbers rose sharply from the mid-1960s onwards and the gaol received criticism for its high levels of incarceration of Aboriginal people and for housing juvenile offenders within the main prison population. To meet the needs of this increasing prison population there were many alterations made to the complex.

In June 1993, three years before it was closed, the original gaol buildings were given heritage status as part of the Alice Springs Heritage Precinct and the Precinct, including the gaol, was entered on the Register of the National Estate in May 1996. The gaol closed two months later.

In 1997, despite heritage protection, the site was set to be developed and a locally formed protest group was formed called 'Save the old gaol". After much lobbying, and a petition with over 2,000 signatures, the gaol was not developed. Instead it was leased to the National Pioneer Women's Hall of Fame, now known as the Women's Museum of Australia. The Women's Museum has maintained the original gaol buildings and gaol stories, including the fight to save the building, are shared. The museum was founded by Molly Clark and opened in 2007.
