= Goodenia larapinta =

Scientific classification
- Kingdom: Plantae
- Clade: Embryophytes
- Clade: Tracheophytes
- Clade: Angiosperms
- Clade: Eudicots
- Clade: Asterids
- Order: Asterales
- Family: Goodeniaceae
- Genus: Goodenia
- Species: G. larapinta

Binomial name
- Goodenia larapinta Tate

Species of plant

Goodenia larapinta is a species of flowering plant in the family Goodeniaceae and is endemic to the Northern Territory. It is an erect perennial herb with elliptic to lance-shaped stem-leaves and racemes of yellow flowers.

== Description ==
Goodenia larapinta is an erect perennial herb that typically grows to a height of 50 cm (20 in). It has elliptic to lance-shaped leaves arranged along the stem, 15–40 mm (0.59–1.57 in) long and 6–12 mm (0.24–0.47 in) wide. The flowers are arranged in racemes up to 200 mm (7.9 in) long with leaf-like bracts, each flower on a pedicel 6–15 mm (0.24–0.59 in) long. The sepals are lance-shaped, 2–2.5 mm (0.079–0.098 in) long, the corolla yellow, 12–15 mm (0.47–0.59 in) long. The lower lobes of the corolla are up to 4–5 mm (0.16–0.20 in) long with wings 1–2 mm (0.039–0.079 in) wide. Flowering mainly occurs from April to September and the fruit is a cylindrical capsule 8–9 mm (0.31–0.35 in) long.

== Taxonomy and naming ==
Goodenia larapinta was first formally described in 1896 by Ralph Tate in the Report on the work of the Horn Scientific Expedition to Central Australia. In 1990, Roger Charles Carolin selected specimens collected by Tate near Glen Edith in June 1894 as the lectotype.

== Distribution and habitat ==
This goodenia grows in rocky places in the Northern Territory, south from the Barkly Tableland.

== Conservation status ==
Goodenia larapinta is classified as "least concern" under the Northern Territory Government Territory Parks and Wildlife Conservation Act 1976.
