= Stuart Town Gaol =

Prison in Alice Springs, Australia

Coordinates: 23°41′54″S 133°52′53″E

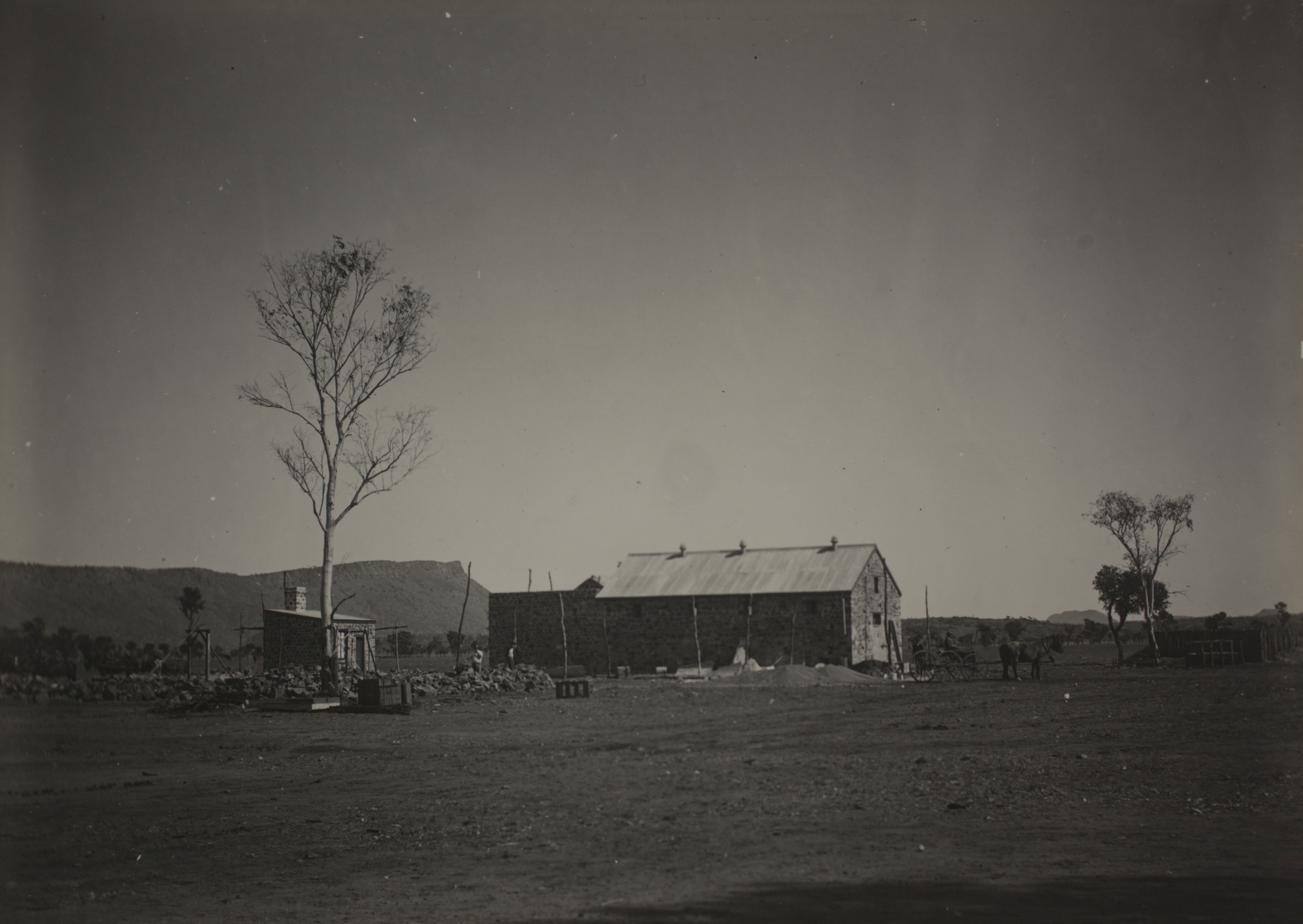
Stuart Town Gaol while under construction

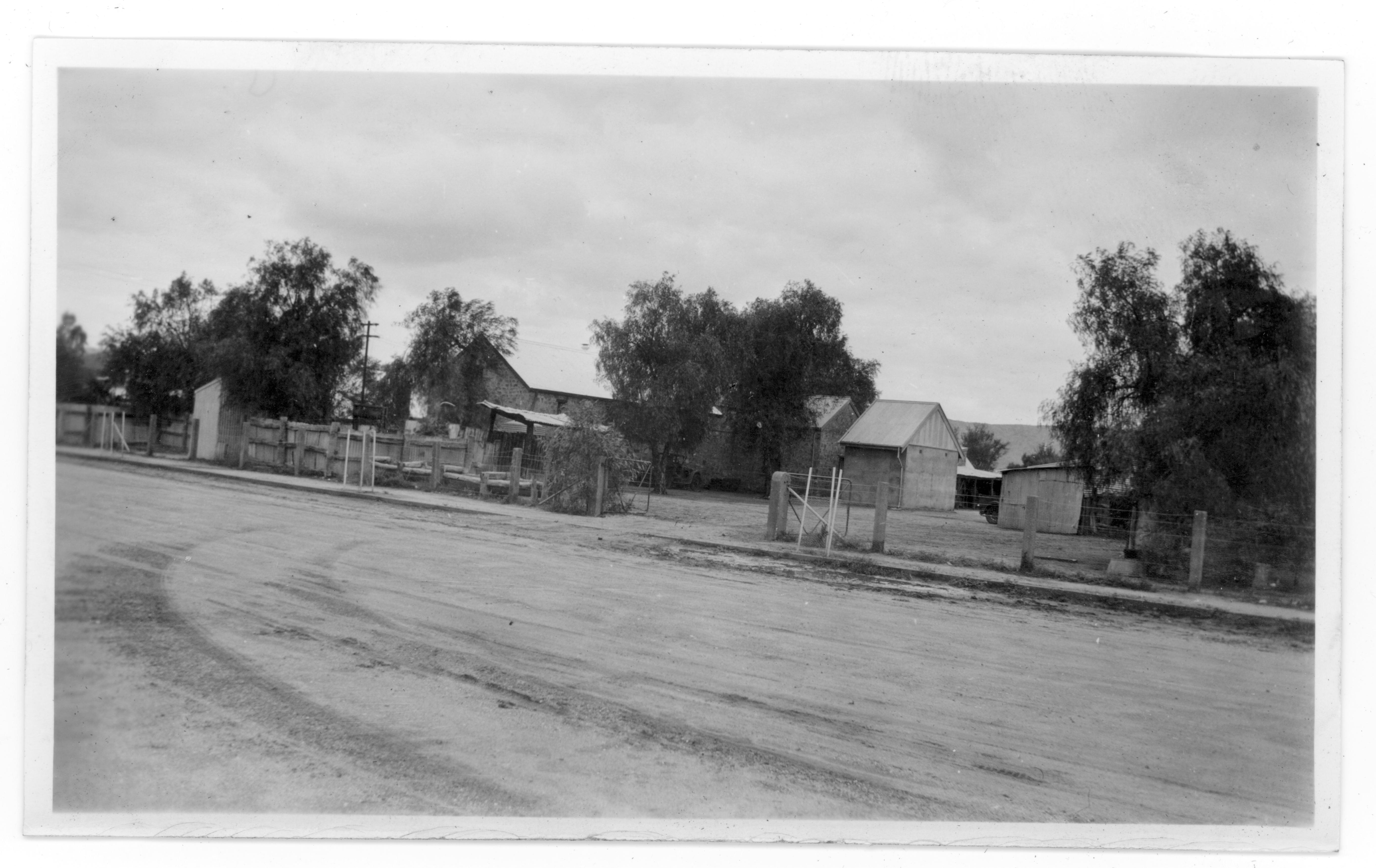
Stuart Town Gaol in 1937-1938

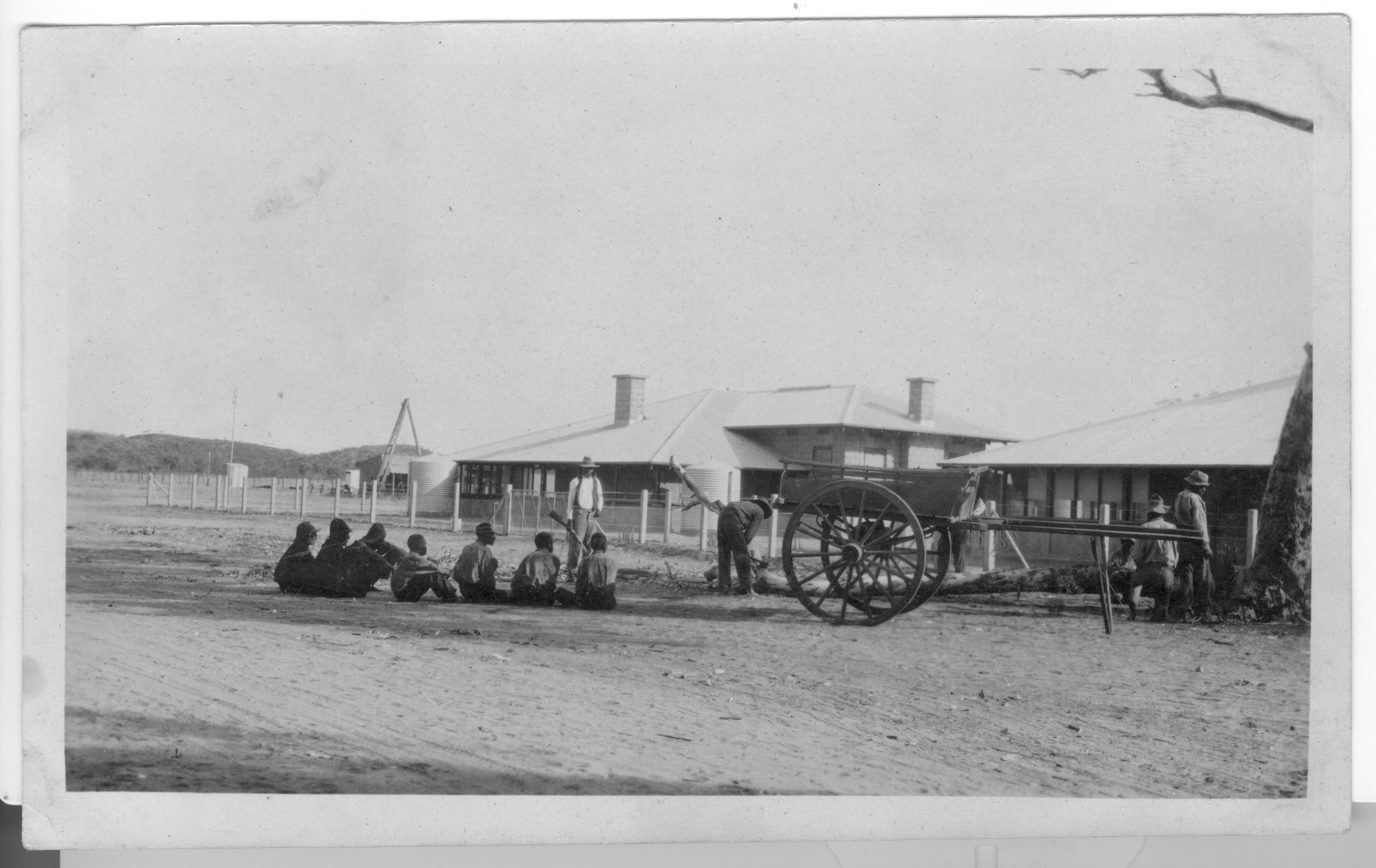
Some prisoners at the gaol in the late 1920s

Stuart Town Gaol in Alice Springs (formerly Stuart), Northern Territory, Australia, located on 9 Parson Street, was constructed in 1907, when Alice Springs had a European population of approximately 30 people. It replaced the gaol at the Heavitree Gap Police Station and held its first prisoner in 1909.

It is one of the earliest permanent buildings constructed in the town and the first government building. The gaol follows a simple design and was built, using local materials, by stonemason Jack Williams.

== History ==
Before the construction of this gaol, from 1863 to 1910, when the Northern Territory was under South Australian administration, prisoners were primarily taken to Port Augusta, where they were tried and gaoled. The prisoners, the majority of whom were Aboriginal, were forced to walk in chains, the 1,200 kilometres (750 mi) distance. The harshness of this treatment of the prisoners seems to have been of little or no concern to the authorities; rather, the time taken in waiting and then walking the prisoners in chains was considered cumbersome and a serious drain on limited manpower.

The new gaol consisted of a very small prison cell, used for white prisoners (who had the 'luxury' of sleeping on wooden benches) and a large cell which was used for Aboriginal prisoners; it also had an uncovered exercise yard at the rear. In the larger cell there are iron rings are cemented into the floor (12 for males and 4 for females); supposedly for restraining difficult prisoners. The first Keeper of the Gaol, John Dow, recalled in 1929:

The jail filled all requirements at that time, and was a credit to the Government. It was intended for a police lock-up, and persons not summarily dealt with were sent either to Darwin or Port Augusta. But the Commonwealth authorities evidently turned it into a jail for prisoners with sentences up to five years. It was not intended for this purpose by South Australia. ... there was an exercise yard at the southern end of the jail which was not covered, and a dividing wall between the white and the black quarters.

For many of the Aboriginal prisoners, their time in the gaol was their first contact with Europeans. Most were arrested for stealing cattle, rations and other goods, and gaol records show a direct correlation between periods of drought and spikes in these supposed crimes. The first inmates of the gaol included an Aboriginal man and a woman from the Arltunga goldfields who were charged with "larceny of a dwelling" and an Aboriginal man from Alice Springs who was charged with common assault. People facing longer sentences were still taken to Port Augusta.

Initially the Gaol was run by Robert Stott, a policeman, who was essentially the administrative head of the town and given the title of "keeper of the gaol"; he held this position from 1911 to 1928. In accordance with the custom of the day this meant that Stott's wife, Agnes Stott, became (with the assistance of servants, young Aboriginal girls of mixed descent) the "prison cook" and prepared all of the prisoner meals. With limited availability of food, especially through periods of drought, the meals consisted primarily of goat meat and cabbages as both were plentiful; Kelham (2011) states that "cabbages were one of the few vegetables which could survive the frosts of winter and the heat of summer". For this reason, as the Stott's lived next to the gaol and kept a large cabbage patch between the two buildings.

A later warden, from 1927 to 1937, was John Creed Lovegrove, the police sergeant-in-charge in Alice Springs. Lovegrove's wife Lilian Eleanor (née Styles) was also expected to provide prisoner meals and was not paid.

The Stuart Town Gaol was used until 1938, by which time it was overcrowded, and, a more important consideration at the time, its position now in the very centre of the town was no longer thought appropriate. This was as it kept prisoners too close to the townspeople. It was replaced by Her Majesty's Gaol and Labour Prison which opened in November 1938.

In the 1970s the building was threatened with demolition but was saved by the National Trust of Australia, with a campaign led by Doreen Braitling.

In 1985, the former gaol was listed on the now-defunct Register of the National Estate. In 1994, it was listed on the Northern Territory Heritage Register.
