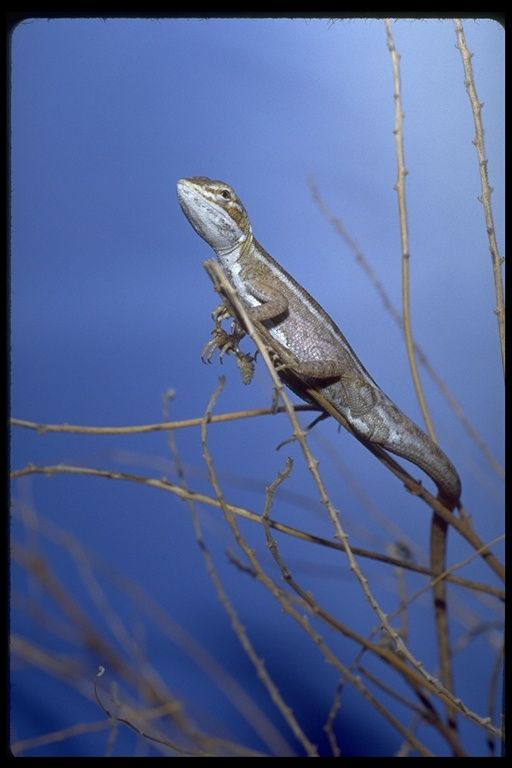
- Canegrass dragon

Conservation status
- Least Concern (IUCN 3.1)

Scientific classification
- Kingdom: Animalia
- Phylum: Chordata
- Class: Reptilia
- Order: Squamata
- Suborder: Iguania
- Family: Agamidae
- Genus: Diporiphora
- Species: D. winneckei

Binomial name
- Diporiphora winneckei Lucas & C. Frost, 1896
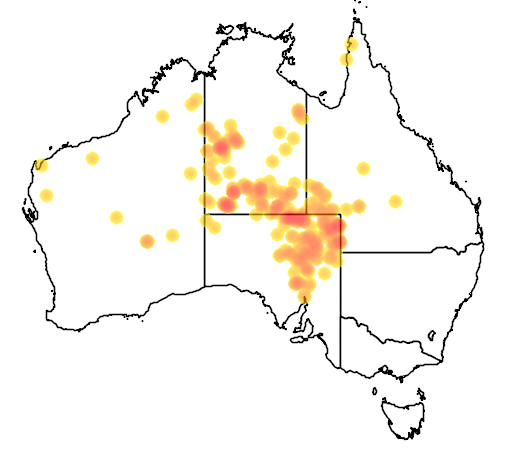

= Diporiphora winneckei =

Species of lizard

Diporiphora winneckei, also known commonly as the canegrass dragon, canegrass two-line dragon, blue-lined dragon, and Winnecke's two-pored dragon, is a species of small, terrestrial, diurnal lizard in the family Agamidae. The species is endemic to Australia. It is found throughout arid zones of Australia and is also a common house pet.

== Etymology ==
The specific name, winneckei, is in honor of Australian explorer Charles George A. Winnecke (1856–1902).

== Description ==
Diporiphora winneckei is a slim lizard with a long tail and limbs, approximately 15–24 cm (5.9–9.4 in) in total length. It is a grey or pale brown to reddish-brown colour, with a thick grey ventral band that runs from the nape to the tail. It also has creamy-yellow (female) or silver grey (male) stripes that run down each side of its back, converging at the pelvis. Dark angular blotches lie between the stripe and the ventral band of female, while males have fewer or no blotches visible. The canegrass dragon also has a creamy mid lateral stripe that runs from eye to ear on each side. It has homogenous scales as well as weak gular and postauricular folds. It lacks the spines and crest that many other dragons display.

== Taxonomy ==
The canegrass dragon was first officially described in 1896 by Arthur Henry Shakespeare Lucas and Charles Frost. Its common name originates from the fact that it is often found in canegrass. Its scientific name, Diporiphora winneckei, suggests that it has two visible pores, however the pores are not visible on this species. The closest species to the canegrass dragon is Amelia's dragon (Diporiphora ameliae) which was split from the canegrass dragon as a new species in 2012. Amelia's dragon has four longitudinal ventral stripes when compared to the canegrass dragons two ventral stripes, as well as having a postauricular fold and spines, which the canegrass dragon lacks.

== Distribution and habitat ==
The canegrass dragon is an endemic species found in the arid zones of Australia, with a rainfall of less than 500mm. It's predominantly found in the region surrounding the junction of the Northern Territory, Queensland, New South Wales, and South Australia borders. However, it also occupies habitat across Western Australia as far as the northern West Australian coastline. The canegrass dragon is usually found on desert sand ridges or other sandy soils in amongst ground litter, cane grass, spinifex or hummock grasses. The canegrass dragon is rarely sighted, despite not being rare, due to its excellent camouflage and secretive behaviour.

== Reproduction ==
The canegrass dragon reaches sexual maturity at around one year old. During the breeding season, the male will attract a female by repeated head bobs, which displays his willingness to mate. If the female is not ready, she will run away. However, if she is, she will lower her head several times to show she is interested. The breeding season for the canegrass dragon is from October to April. During that time, the female can lay between four and six clutches of eggs, between one and three eggs per clutch, in a small nest in moist sandy soil. The eggs will develop in approximately two to three weeks.

== Diet ==
The canegrass dragon feeds during the day and is insectivorous. However, it has been found on some occasions to consume leafy greens and flowers.

== Threats ==
Although the canegrass dragon is not currently listed as a conservation concern, it is still subject to those threats that threaten all Australian reptiles. These threats include introduced diseases, death on roads, habitat modification, degradation and loss, and feral predators such as foxes, dogs, cats, and even cane toads.
