= John Alexander Watt =

Australian geologist (1868–1958)

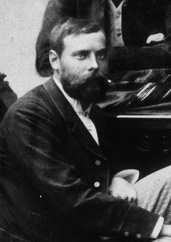
J. A. Watt in 1894

John Alexander Watt (1868–1958) was an Australian geologist and mineralogist and participant of the 1894 Horn Expedition to Central Australia. Born in Parramatta, New South Wales, Watt graduated from the University of Sydney. He died in Tenterfield.
