= Arrarbi =

Australian tracker

Arrarbi (c. 1870 – c. 1945), also known as Arrabi, Arabi Bey, Cowle Bob and Police Bob, was an Aboriginal tracker, police of the Matuntarre people of the region around Tempe Downs Station in the Northern Territory of Australia. He was a guide on the Horn Scientific Expedition to Central Australia, and police tracker and outlaw. He is notable for his many arrests.

== Early life ==
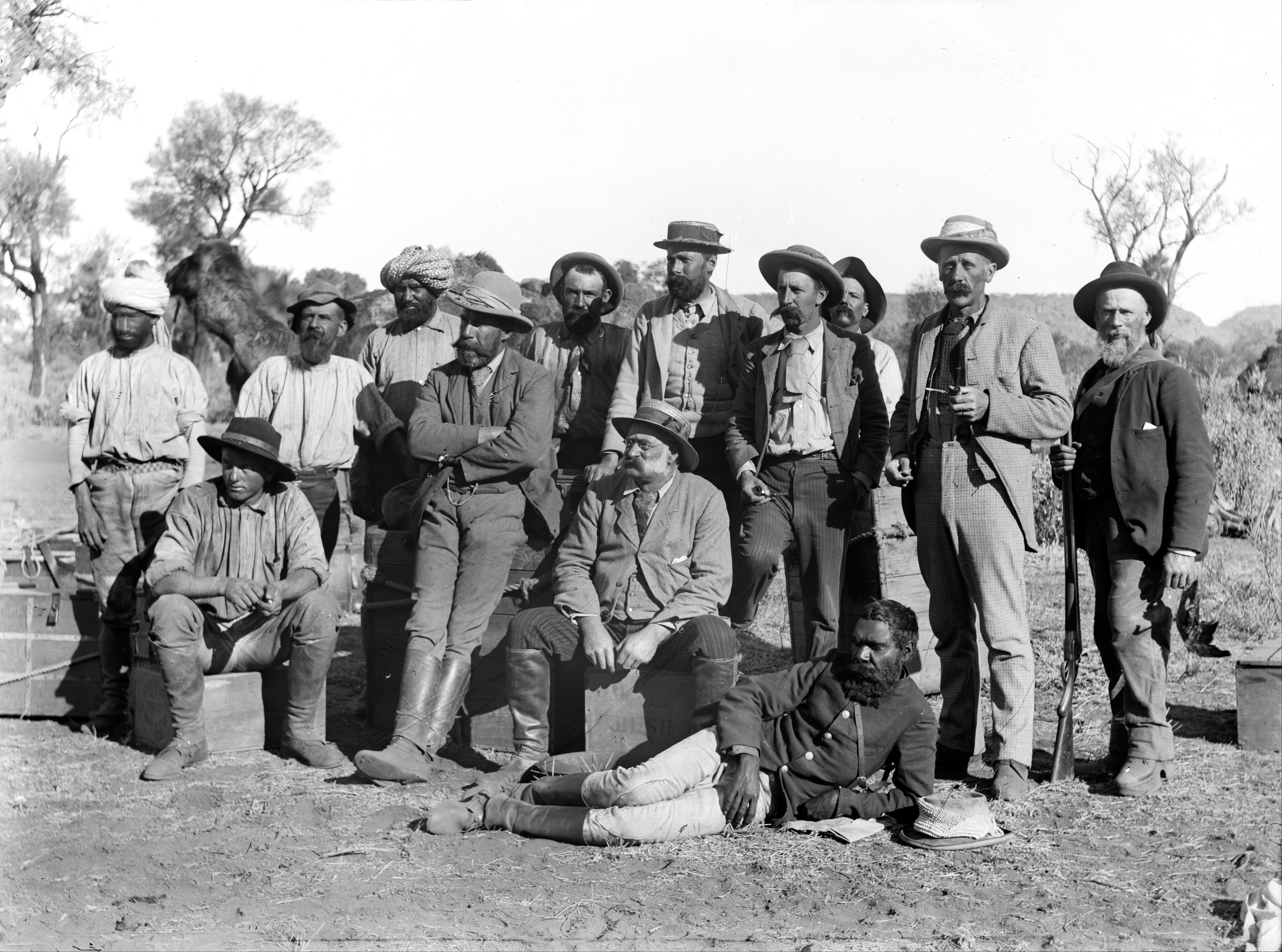
Members of the Horn Expedition, Alice Springs, Central Australia, 1894

Arrarbi was identified as a quick learner and useful worker soon after the establishment of Tempe Downs cattle station in 1884. He was nominated as the preferred guide to that region for the Horn Scientific Expedition to Central Australia in 1894, due to his knowledge of the George Gill Range, an area which includes King’s Canyon, and due to his command of at least four local languages.

He was later part of a raid by Charles Winnecke that plundered a huge repository of sacred cultural objects, known as tjurunga stones and boards. While he helped to interpret the designs of these artefacts for his European employer, he was not judged by local elders to be guilty of the theft itself, and escaped the death penalty meted out to another Aboriginal man who had led the party to the objects.

== Career ==
Due to his usefulness to local European authorities, a local police identity, Constable Charles Cowle arranged a police job for him at Barrow Creek, 300 kilometres north of Alice Springs. Cowle’s hope was that the job would be far enough away from Tempe Downs to keep Arrarbi from joining local Aboriginal people in resisting the intrusion of the station on their lands and hunting the station’s cattle. However Arrarbi returned to Tempe Downs a few months later and within a couple of years was deemed to be one of the most active of the local people in the killing of cattle. For the next few years police tried unsuccessfully to arrest him while Arrarbi made a series of daring escapes as he continued to live by his wits in the rugged country around what is now the south western part of the Northern Territory. In 1899 his old sponsor Constable Cowle managed to arrest him and Arrabi was sent to jail in Port Augusta 1200 kilometres to the south of his own country. However he was again back within a year, again successfully evading reprisals by Aboriginal and European enemies.

== Later life ==
Arrarbi is thought to have rejoined the police force later in life, possibly working as a tracker in the Arltunga area in mid-1920s. He had two wives and several children, and is believed to have died in 1945. His life is interesting also for demonstrating the difficulty Central Australian Aboriginal people faced in navigating the changes brought by European invasion of their lands. Constable Cowle regarded him as a scoundrel, but anthropologist Baldwin Spencer, who also had contact with him, sympathized with Arrarbi and looked upon him as a hero for his people. He broke European laws, and also made some mortal enemies among Aboriginal people. But he was leader in the resistance by local Aboriginal peoples against white intrusion and destruction of their way of life. In that sense, his life reflects the challenges faced by Aboriginal people of the region during that time, as their traditional lands and water sources were occupied by European cattlemen.
