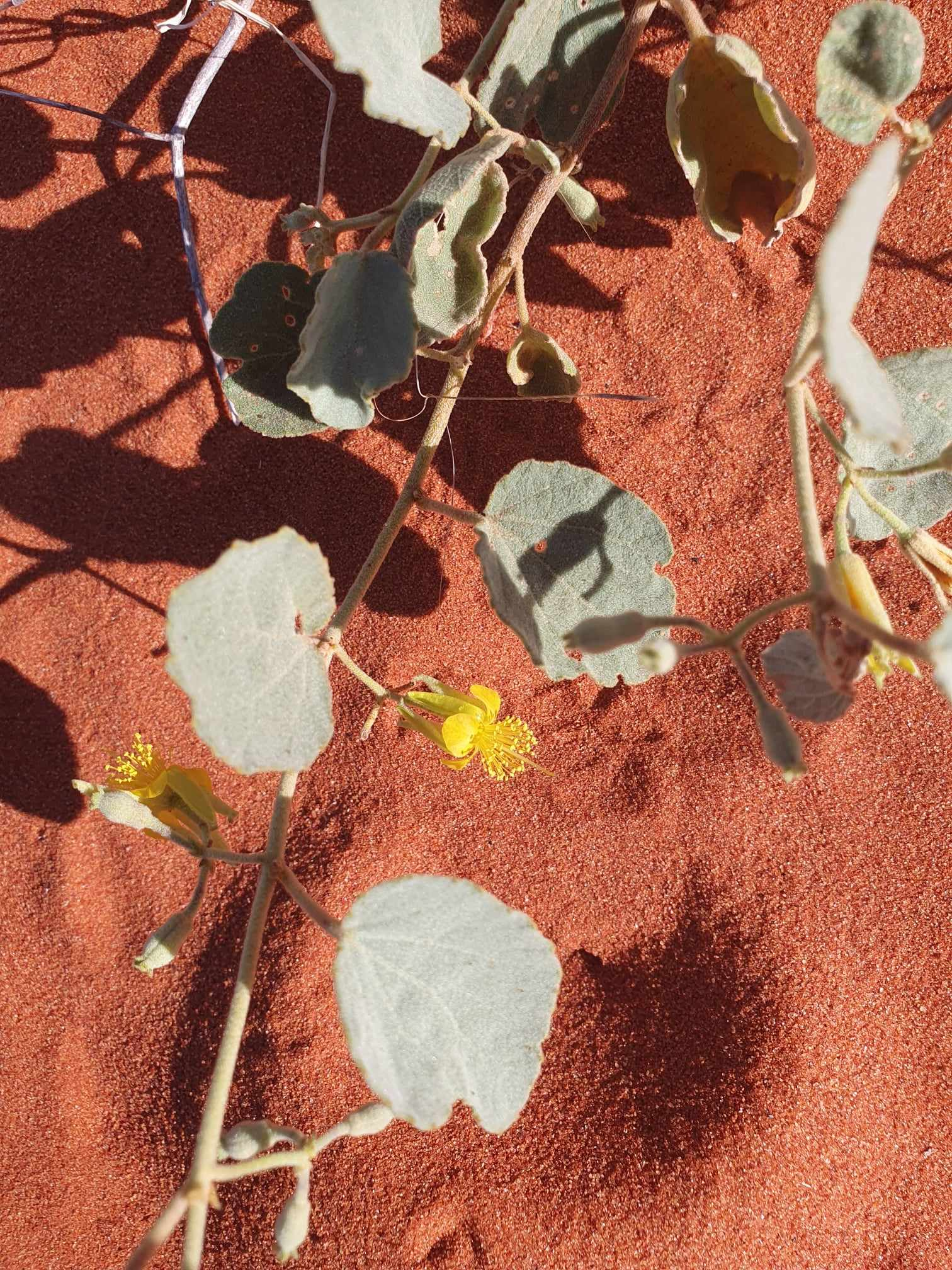

Scientific classification
- Kingdom: Plantae
- Clade: Tracheophytes
- Clade: Angiosperms
- Clade: Eudicots
- Clade: Rosids
- Order: Malvales
- Family: Malvaceae
- Genus: Triumfetta
- Species: T. winneckeana

Binomial name
- Triumfetta winneckeana F. Muell.

Synonyms
- Triumfetta winneckiana (F. Muell.)

= Triumfetta winneckeana =

Species of plant

Triumfetta winneckeana is a species of flowering plant in the family Malvaceae, native to central Australia, including Queensland, the Northern Territory, and Western Australia.

== Description ==
The plant grows as a prostrate shrub in the arid zone of central Australia. The leaves are velvety, and the flowers are bright yellow with many stamens. The seeds are round, with hooked spikes protruding in all directions. It is zoochorous, dispersing its barbed seeds via attachment to animals.

== Taxonomy ==
The species was first described by Ferdinand von Mueller in 1884 based on a collection made by the explorer and botanist Charles Winnecke, whom the species epithet winneckeana honours.

== Gallery ==
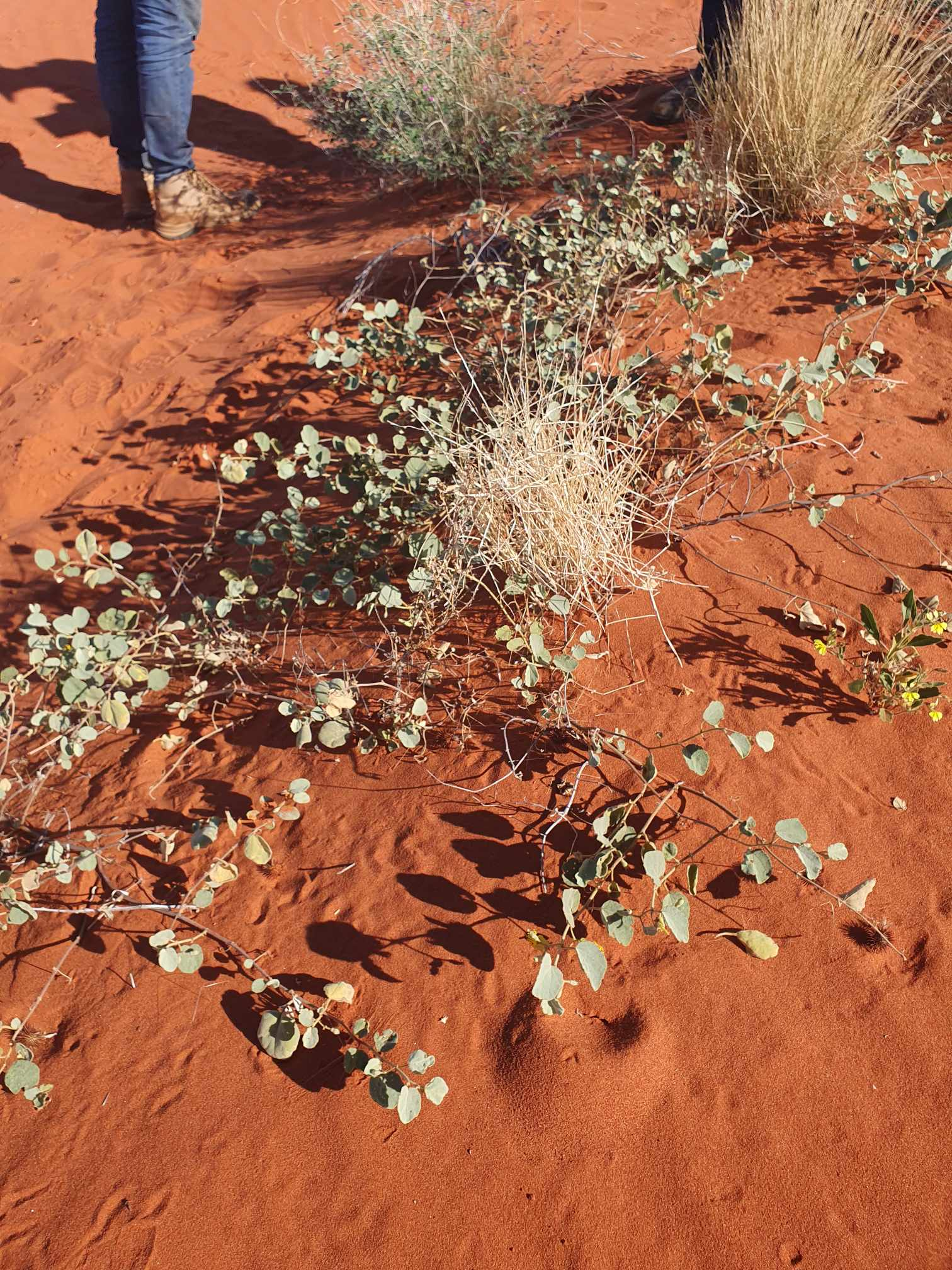

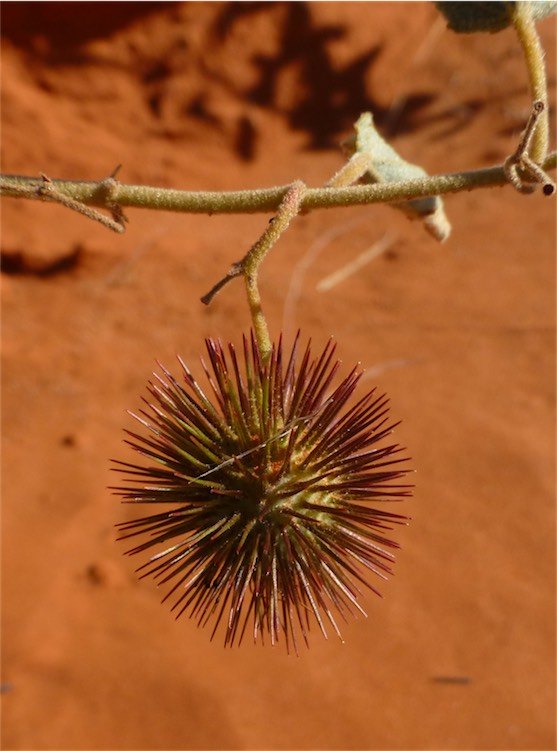
