= Heavitree Gap =

Gap in line of hills near Alice Springs

- Ntaripe
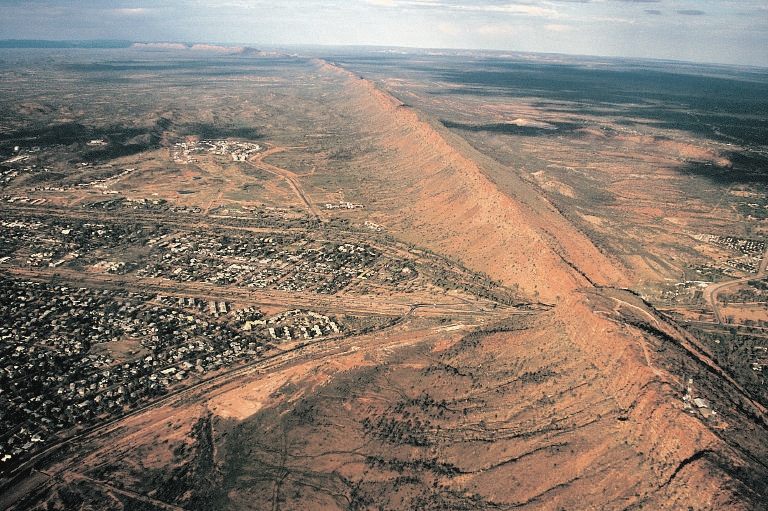
- This view shows the transport links passing through Heavitree Gap

- Location within Northern Territory
- Traversed by: Stuart Highway, Adelaide–Darwin railway

Third Approach
- Location: Alice Springs
- Range: MacDonnell Ranges
- Coordinates: 23.7263°S 133.8656°E

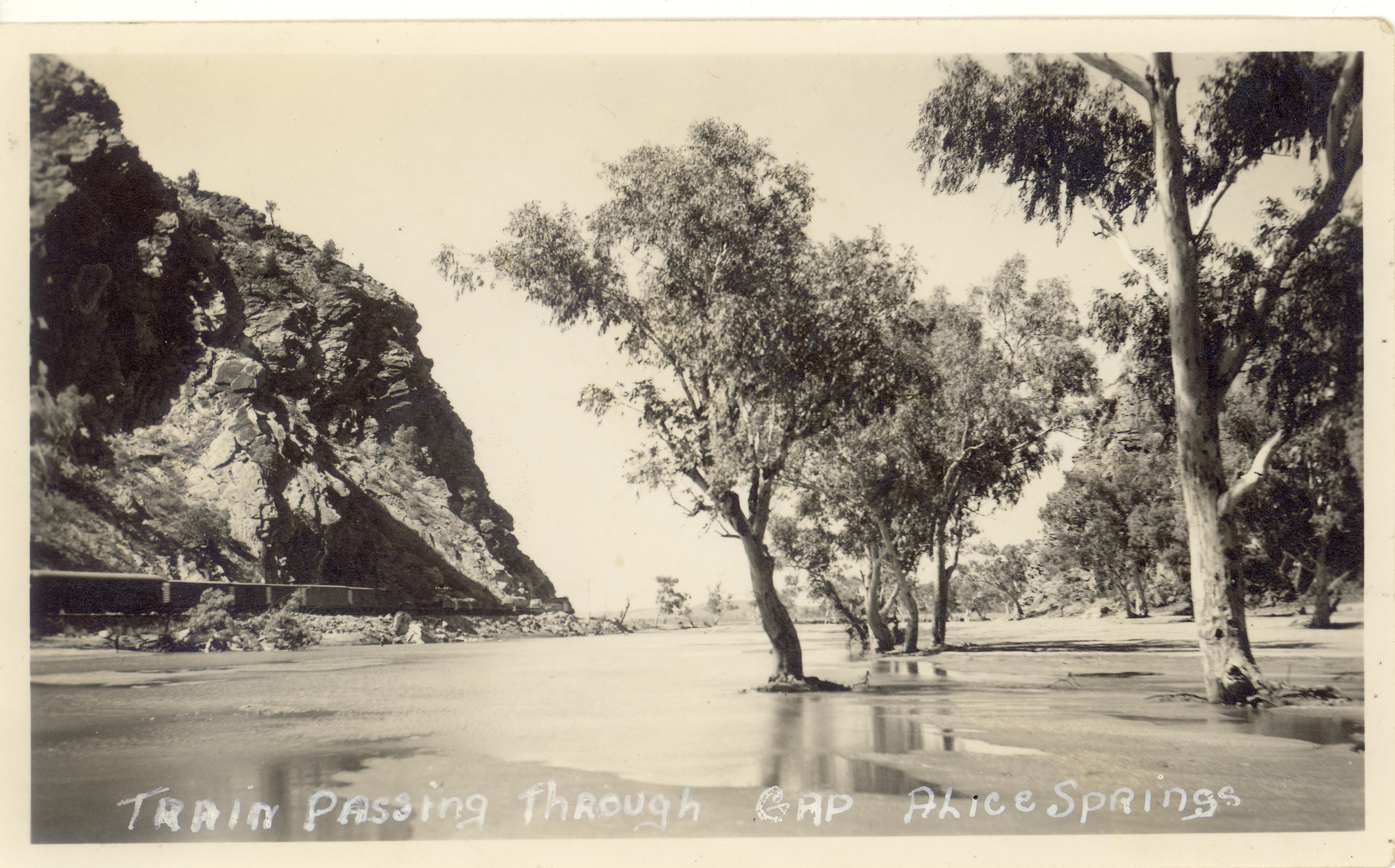
Train passing through Heavitree Gap, Alice Springs, 1938 - 1948

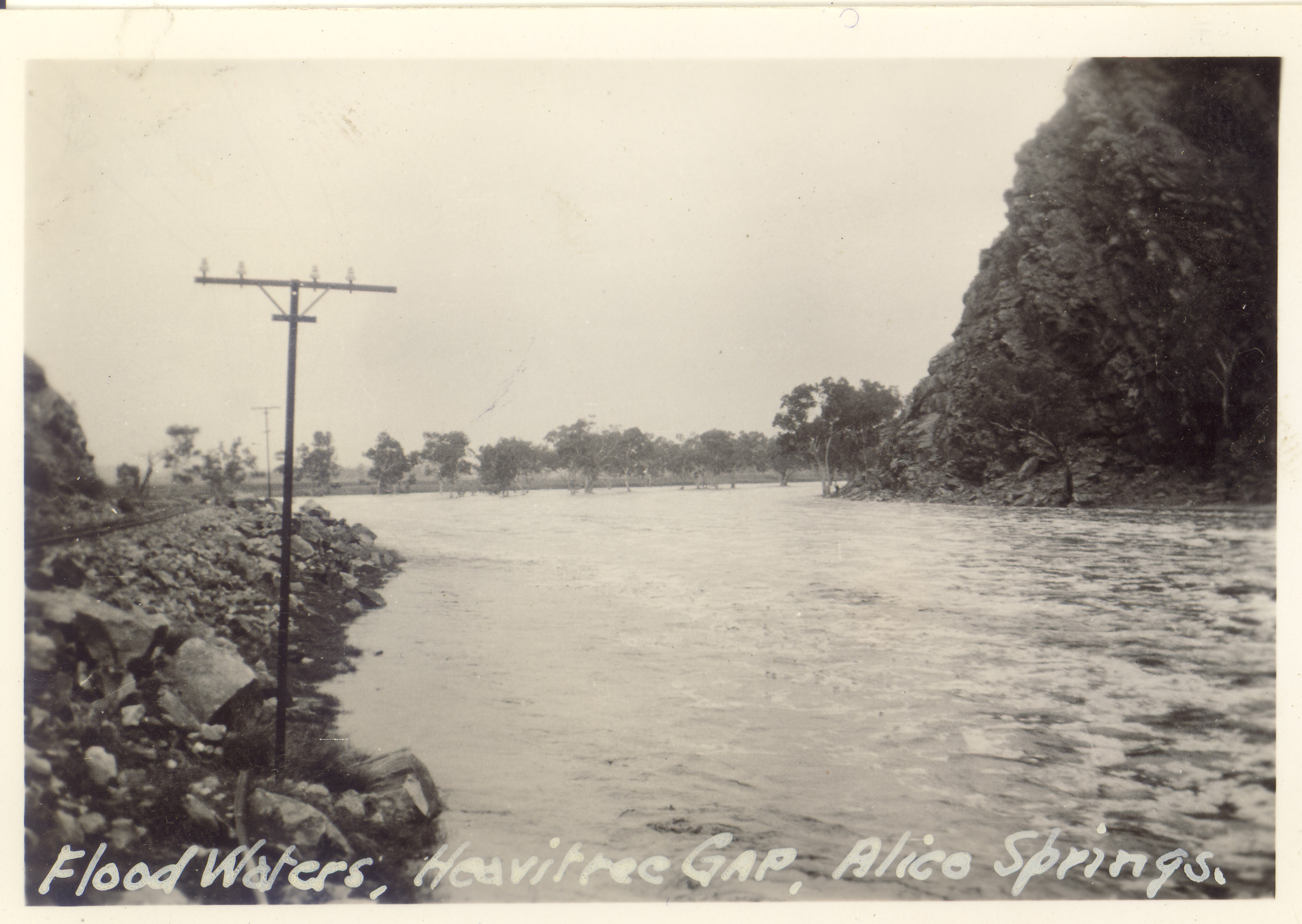
Floodwaters in Heavitree Gap, 1938 - 1948

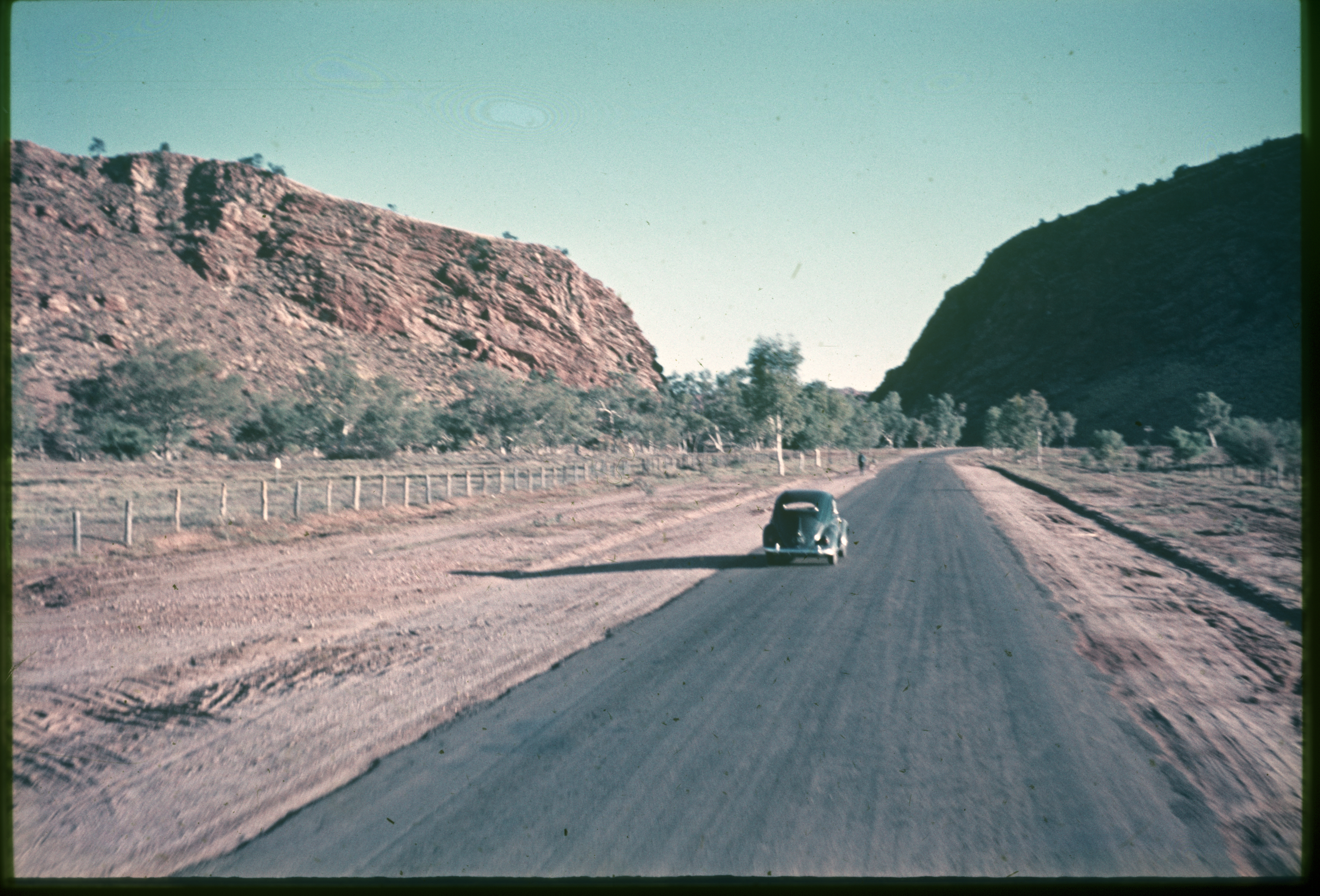
The road leading to Heavitree Gap in 1957 or 1958

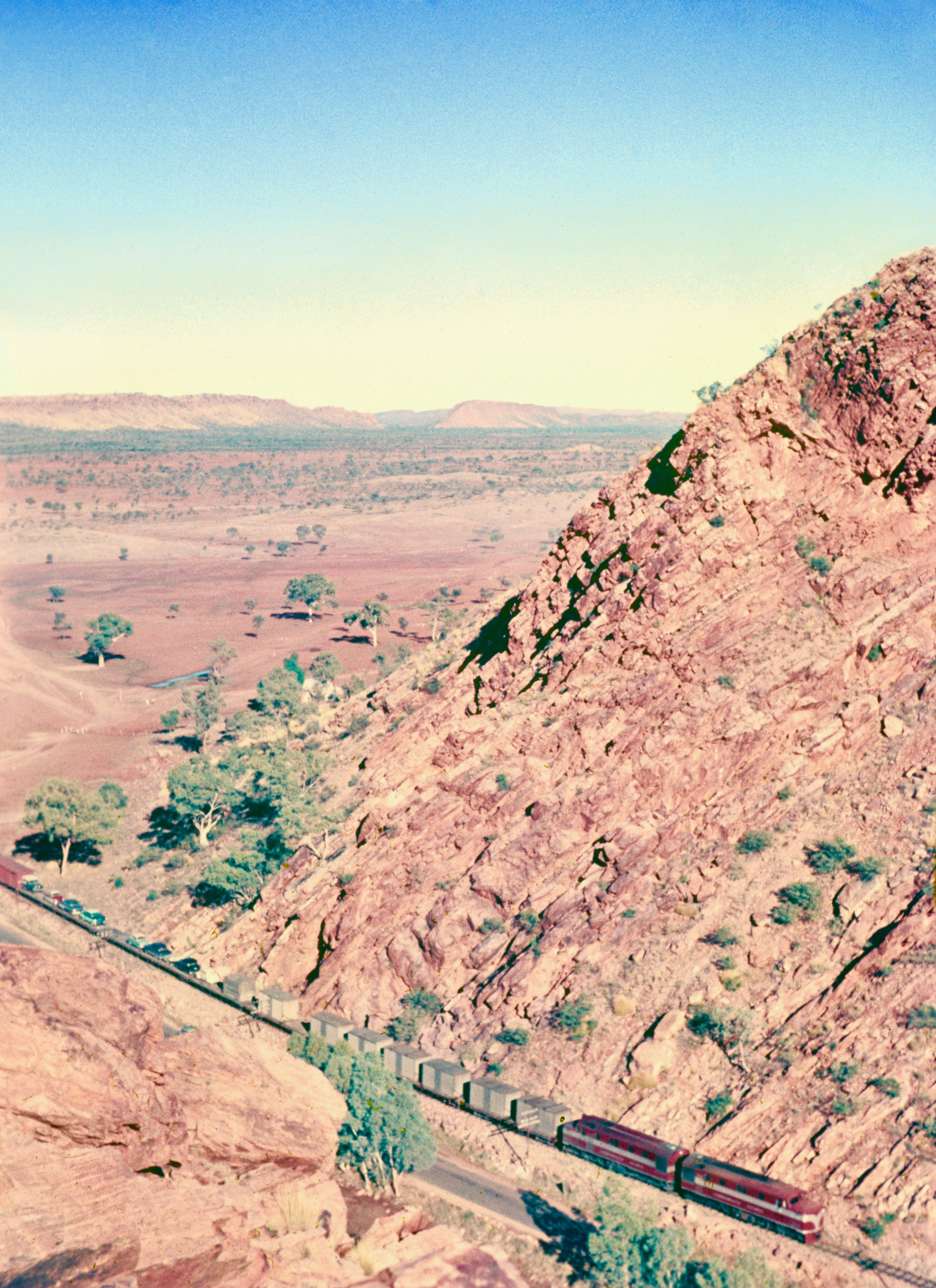
The Ghan passing through Heavitree Gap in 1957 or 1958

The Heavitree Gap, or Ntaripe in the Arrernte language, is a water gap in the Northern Territory of Australia in the MacDonnell Ranges. It is the southern entrance to the city of Alice Springs and in addition to the Todd River it carries the main road and rail access to the south.

The Gap is an important sacred site for the Arrernte people and its use as a thoroughfare was avoided by women prior to the construction of the road and later Central Australia Railway.

The Gap was named by William Mills, the Overland Telegraph line surveyor who discovered the location for Alice Springs. It was named after his former school in Heavitree, Devon.

On the southwest side of The Gap is the historic Heavitree Gap Police Station.

The Gap has been painted by numerous artists including Albert Namatjira, Oscar Namatjira, Basel Rangea, and John Borrack.
