= Eileen Fitzer =

Australian nurse and activist (1902–2002)

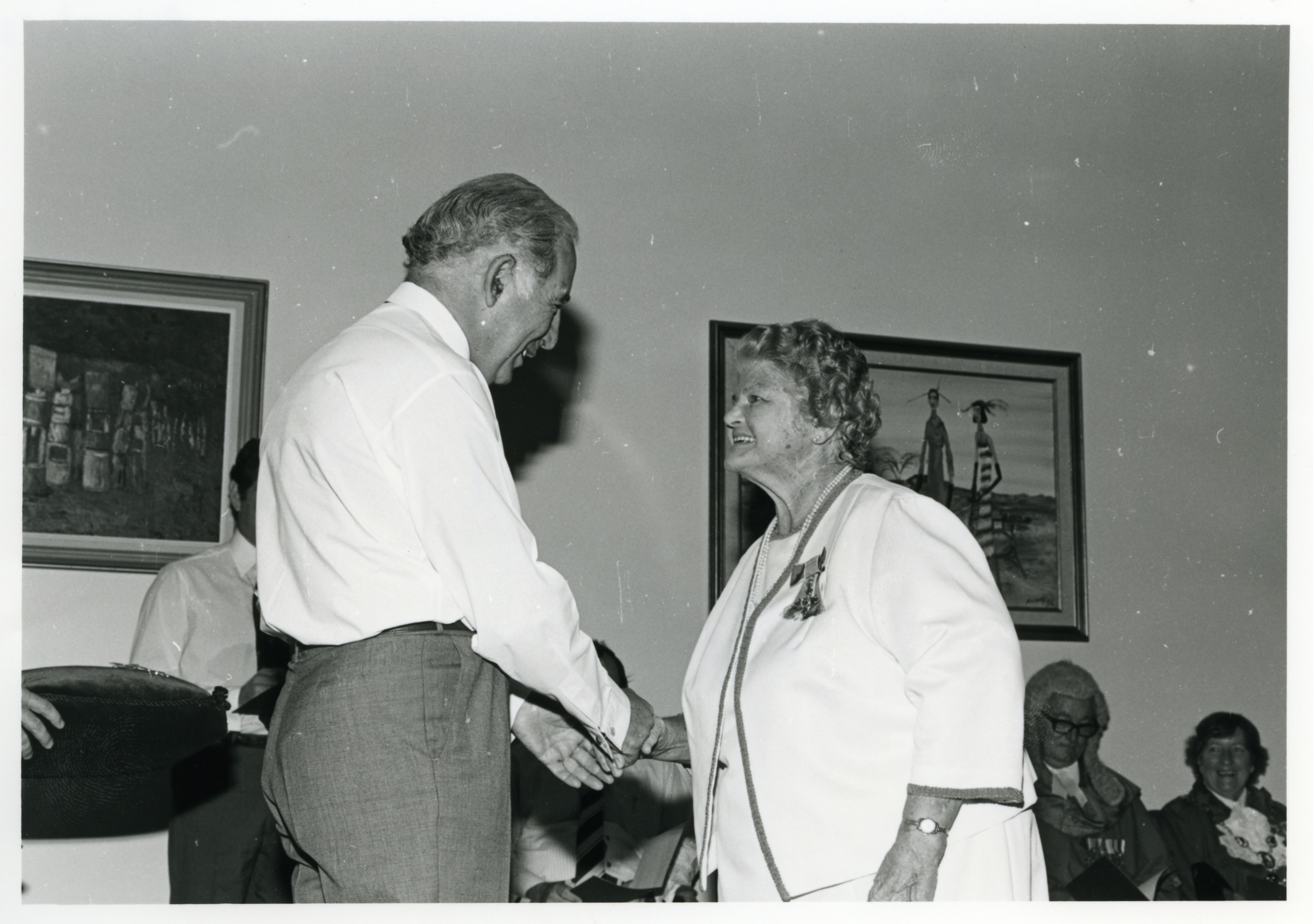
Investiture of Eileen Marjory Fitzer by Sir Zelman Cowen

Eileen Marjory Fitzer (29 March 1902 – 27 August 2002) was an Australian nursing sister, political activist and Northern Territory pioneer.

== Early life ==
She was born at Brock's Creek, near Pine Creek, and was the youngest of 5 children born to Tom and Eleanor Styles. Her father was the underground manager for the Zapopan Mine, a gold mine, and she would later recall a happy childhood with a lot of singing and dancing. When Fitzer was 7 she travelled with her mother and sister Myrtle so that her mother could be treated for cancer, unfortunately the cancer was too advanced, and they returned to the Northern Territory where she died in 1910; she was only 36 years old.

== Career ==
In 1928 Fitzer attended nursing training in Melbourne but did not find that life there suited her.

On the completion of her studies she moved to Alice Springs from 1932 - 1934 to work as a nursing sister at The Bungalow, a home for Aboriginal children, there she also performed a teaching role. In her oral history she recalls this as being a very happy time. While she was there a severe trachoma epidemic broke out, they then called the condition 'sandy blight' and she spent several weeks in isolation at the Heavitree Gap Police Station while she, and her two teenage assistants from The Bungalow, treated those affected. 17 children were in isolation with them and were mostly made up of children from The Bungalow and the children of Afghan cameleers and adults would come daily for their treatment but were not kept there; Reverend Harry Griffiths also cared for an estimated 100 adults within the town itself. They treated the affected with mercury drops.

She was later transferred and promoted to Sister-In-Charge at Pine Creek Hospital in 1934. In 1936, following the shock death of her sister Gertrude, she married longtime friend Harry Gribbons in Darwin; she was distressed following her sister's death and decided she did not want to be alone any longer. She affectionately referred to Harry as her "wild Irishman". During their marriage she spent time working at the Channel Island Leprosarium.

Harry died in 1943 and two years later Fitzer married NT policeman, Tas Fitzer. The pair had met in 1920 but their relationship 'blossomed' after Eileen saved his life following a kick from a wild colt during the wet season, which made him almost impossible to reach to provide medical help. Tas was left in agony for many weeks until Fitzer was able to reach him, with the help of Aboriginal trackers. After their marriage they moved to Daly River.

While in the Daly River she had her own medical emergency in 1946 which required the skills of Aboriginal trackers to save her, a corroboree was also performed to save her. The incident made news around Australia and, afterwards, she became known as the "White Queen of the Daly".

They later settled in Timber Creek.

== Later life ==
The Fitzers retired to Avalon in Sydney in 1955 after Tas was told he must leave the tropics for his health and, after he died in 1966, Eileen returned to Darwin.

In 1980, at the age of 78, Fitzer received an MBE for her services to nursing and the community.

In 2001 two cloths she embroidered were featured in the Museum and Art Gallery of the Northern Territory 'Threads of History: the embroidered record' (25 May - 26 August 2001).

Fitzer died on 27 August 2001 and she is buried at the Darwin Gardens Cemetery.

Fitzer is one of the women celebrated in the mosaic of Damoe-Ra Park.

== Resources ==
Library & Archives NT hold the following resources from Fitzer

- NTRS 1734 Copies of extracts from letters written by Tas and Eileen Fitzer about police work and life in remote areas of the Northern Territory (1939 - 1955).
- NTRS 226 TS 588, Transcript of oral history interview with Eillen Fitzer (1990), interviewer Ronda Jamieson.
