= Women's Museum of Australia =

Museum in Alice Springs, Australia

Coordinates: 23.7041°S 133.8769°E

- Former name: National Pioneer Women's Hall of Fame
- Established: 1993
- Location: Alice Springs, Northern Territory, Australia
- Type: Women's History
- Website: http://www.pioneerwomen.com.au

The Women's Museum of Australia, formerly the National Pioneer Women's Hall of Fame, is a museum focused on the place of women in Australian history, situated in the restored HM Gaol and Labour Prison building in Alice Springs, Northern Territory, Australia.

== History ==
The museum was founded in 1993 by Molly Clark of Old Andado Station. It opened in September 1994 in the town's Old Courthouse building, which had been leased for a period of five years.

By 2001, the premises had become too small and the NT-heritage-listed Old Alice Springs Gaol was offered as a new location. In 2007 the museum was officially opened in its new location by Marion Scrymgour, Minister for Women's Policy and the first Indigenous Australian woman to be elected to the Parliament of the Northern Territory.

In 2019 the National Pioneer Women's Hall of Fame was renamed the Women's Museum of Australia, and in 2020 refurbishment of the car park and new plans for future exhibitions commenced.

== Description ==
The museum is located in the HM Gaol and Labour Prison Alice Springs building in Alice Springs.

The museum aims to recognise the place of women in history, and particularly the role of women in Australia's development. It recognises "any woman who is a pioneer in her chosen field from settlement to present day".

The museum's permanent exhibitions include Ordinary Women/ Extraordinary Lives - Women First in Their Field, the Signature Quilt, Women at the Heart (Central Australia), What's Work Worth and the Aviatrix Tapestry.

== Patrons ==
The museum has two patrons: Dame Quentin Bryce, a former Governor-General of Australia, and Gaby Kennard, the first Australian woman to fly solo around the world, in 1989.
