= Molly Clark =

Pastoral and tourism pioneer from Central Australia

Molly Clark (c.1920 - 2012) was a pastoral and tourism pioneer from Central Australia in the Northern Territory of Australia. She established the National Pioneer Women's Hall of Fame.

== Early life ==
Clark began her working life as a governess on Mungeranie Station on the Birdsville Track. She met her husband Malcolm Clark, known as Mac, marrying him in 1946. They had three sons, Graham, Kevin and Philip.

== Andado Station ==
The family moved to Andado Station 330 kilometres south east of Alice Springs, originally living in the 1920s homestead. In 1960, they moved 18 kilometres west to higher ground.

In 1975, Clark's middle son Kevin, had a severe car accident but survived. In 1978, her husband died from a heart attack. Nine months later, her eldest son Graham was killed in a freight train accident. When asked about this hardship in later life, Clark said 'I was dealt a certain hand in life and I just got on with it.'

Due to an outbreak of Brucellosis and Tuberculosis, Clarke was forced to destroy her cattle by the Northern Territory Government. She had to sell most of the property in 1984, but kept a 45 square kilometres block surrounding the old homestead, which she called "Old Andado". She started a tourism business with camping facilities, food and tours of the property.

Clark received a Brolga Award for her contribution to tourism in 1995. She also received the 1998 NT Chief Minister’s Women’s Achievements Award and in 1999 a Commonwealth Recognition Award for Senior Australians in the Northern Territory Electorate.

Disappointed with the under-representation of women in the Stockman's Hall of Fame in Longreach, Queensland, Clark established the National Pioneer Women's Hall of Fame in Alice Springs in 1993. It was eventually permanently housed in the town’s old jailhouse, opening 8 March 2007 on International Women’s Day.

The Old Andado homestead was heritage listed in 1995.

== Later life ==
Clark left Andado Station after 50 years due to poor health and eyesight, moving to Alice Springs. She died on 23 September 2012 in Alice Springs.
