= Tempe Downs Station =

Pastoral lease in the Northern Territory, Australia

Coordinates: 24.379117°S 132.42483°E

Location in the Northern Territory

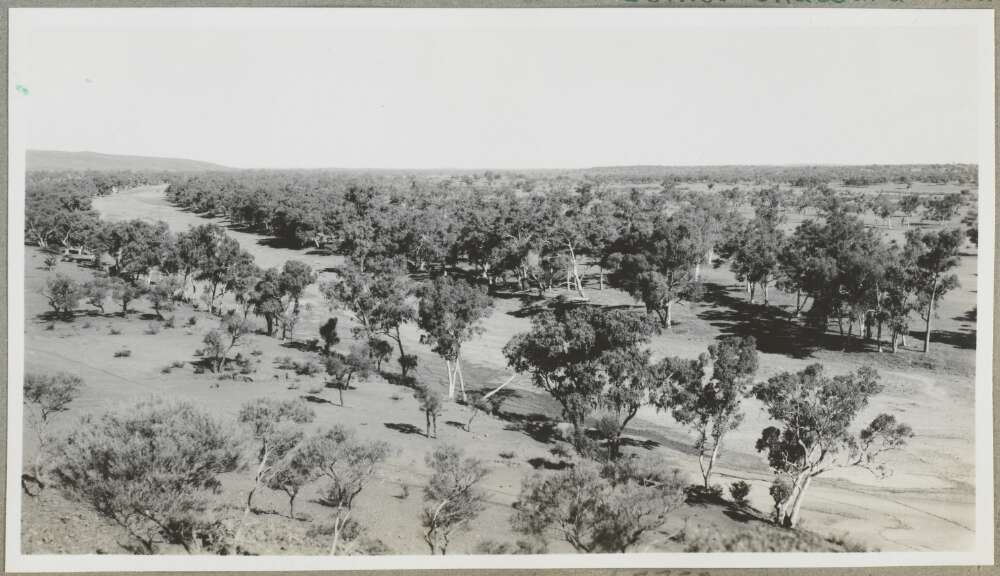
The riverbed Tempe Downs in 1947, as pictured by Arthur Groom

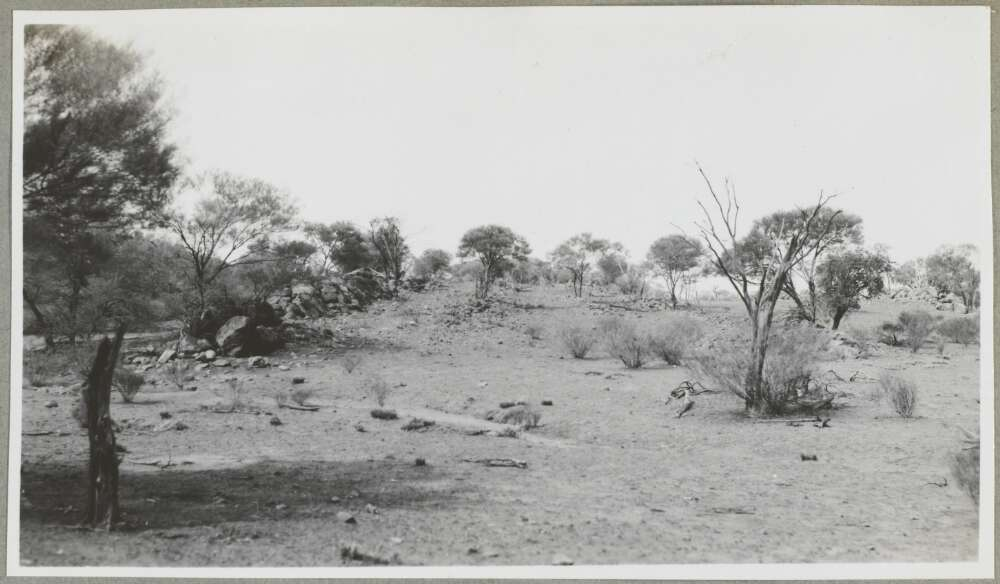
The scrub at Tempe Downs, Northern Territory in 1947, as pictured by Arthur Groom

Tempe Downs Station is a pastoral lease 200 kilometres (120 mi) east of Alice Springs in the Northern Territory of Australia. It is approximately 7,769 square kilometres (3,000 sq mi) in size. It is near the Kings Creek Station and Watarrka National Park.

It is on the traditional lands of the Luritja people.

== Early history ==
The lands that make up Tempe Downs Station were first claimed for pastoral purposes by scientist and explorer Charles Chewings in partnership with other investors, including RJ Thornton in 1881. They began stocking it with cattle in 1884. Thornton was the shareholder-manager and he worked closely with Arrarbi who helped him in this. They struggled to make the new station profitable and 1893 in was sold and then left largely abandoned until 1906 when it was taken over by Bob and Bill Coulthard.

In 1891 NT policeman William Willshire attacked sleeping Aboriginal people at the station and two men were killed. The incident was investigated by Francis James Gillen, and Willshire was subsequently charged with and acquitted of murder.

In 1894 the station was visited by the Horn expedition, who spent some time there and spent time documenting and making field notes about the site and the people living there. During this visit it was decided that Arrarbi would join the expedition as a tracker and interpreter; he later returned to the station.

In 1918 the property was again sold, this time to George Bennet, who entrusted its management to Trot and Amelia Kunoth, who remained there until about 1927. Since then the property has been sold and transferred numerous times.

In 1947 the station was visited by Arthur Groom, who wrote about his experiences in I Saw a Strange Land (1950) and also photographed the station.

== See also ==
- List of ranches and stations
