= William Willshire (policeman) =

Australian police officer (1852–1925)

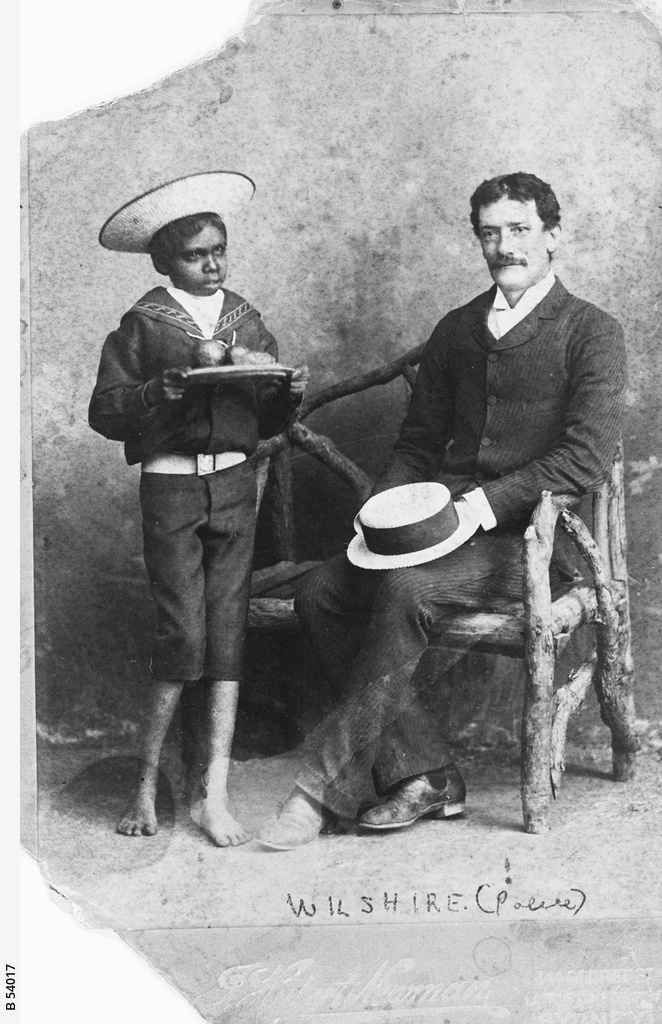
- Mounted Constable Willshire (right) in 1895

Personal details
- Born: William Henry Willshire; 10 March 1852 Adelaide, South Australia
- Died: 22 August 1925 (aged 73) Adelaide, South Australia
- Spouse: Ellen Sarah Howell
- Occupation: Police constable

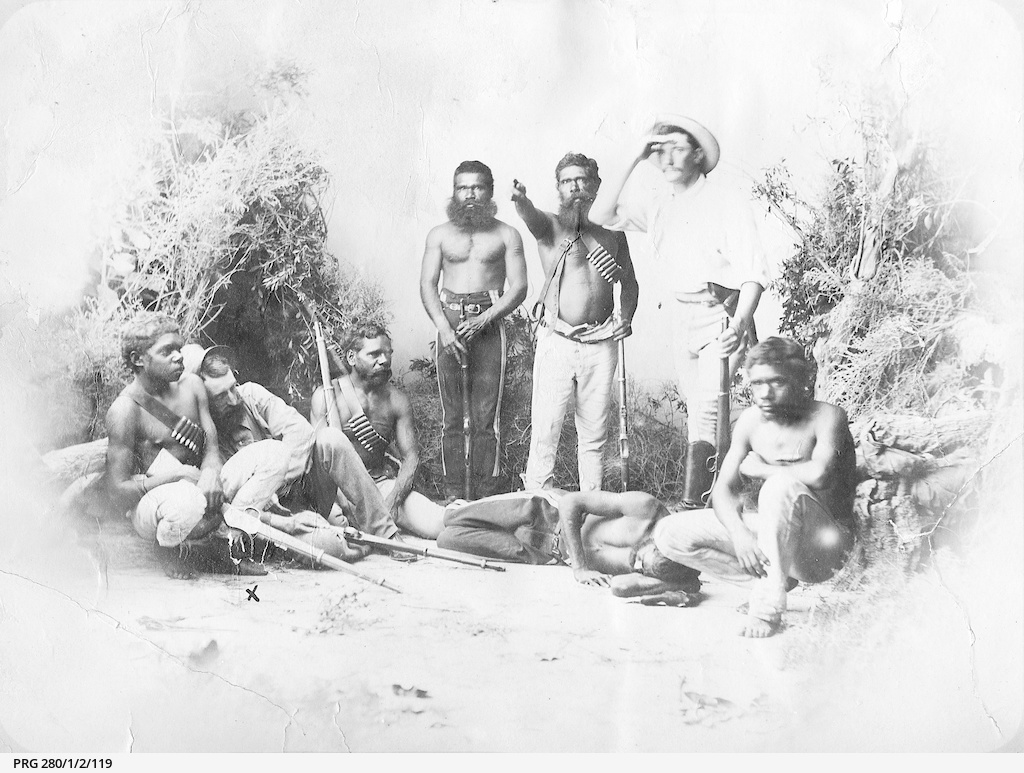
Mounted Constable Willshire with members of his Aboriginal police contingent

William Henry Willshire (10 March 1852 – 22 August 1925) was an Australian police officer who worked in Alice Springs in the Northern Territory of Australia. He was the first police officer to be charged for murder in Australian history, after killing a group of Aboriginal people at Tempe Downs Station.

== Early life ==
Willshire was born on 10 March 1852 in Adelaide, South Australia. He was the son of a schoolmaster James Doughty Willshire and his wife Emily Elizabeth (née Schlenkrich).

== Alice Springs posting ==
In 1878, he joined the South Australian Police Force and was posted to Alice Springs four years later. By 1883, he was promoted to first-class mounted constable, and then took charge of a native police force consisting of six men, investigating incidents such as cattle spearing.

In 1886, he established the police station at Heavitree Gap. He also built a short-lived outpost at Boggy Hole near Hermannsburg. It was closed after three chained prisoners were shot in the back by police while allegedly escaping.

By 1890, he was responsible for the deaths of more than 13 Aboriginal people, although that number may have been higher due to poor documentation of incidents.

== Murder trial ==
In 1891 Willshire's men attacked a group of sleeping Aboriginal people camped at Tempe Downs Station, killing two. The incident was investigated by Frank Gillen, the Sub-Protector of Aborigines. Upon his recommendation, Willshire was the first policeman charged with murder, and stood trial in Port Augusta. Pastor Hermann Kempe of Hermannsburg Mission helped Gillen to bring him to justice.

The case was highly controversial. Public subscriptions raised £2,000 (equivalent to $310,000 in 2022) for Willshire's bail and paid for his defence by John Downer, a prominent barrister and former premier of the colony. While Aboriginal witnesses gave evidence, Willshire was acquitted. While there was significant public support, there was also outrage from those who opposed the finding, many of whom questioned the validity of the legal process.

After the trial, Willshire was transferred to the Victoria River district in 1893 but was permanently removed from the position in 1895 for fear of further controversies and returned to Adelaide.

== Later life ==
Willshire wrote a semi-autobiographical book, A Thrilling Tale of Real Life in the Wilds of Australia, in 1895. He later applied for the position of state Protector of Aborigines, but was unsuccessful and resigned in 1908.

Willshire married Ellen Sarah Howell on 13 September 1896 at Port Lincoln, South Australia. They had a son and a daughter.

He died on 22 August 1925 in Adelaide.

A street in The Gap, a suburb of Alice Springs, is named after him.
