= Jose Petrick =

Northern Territorian activist

Jose Petrick OAM (née Tizard, born 14 February 1924) is a British-born Australian historian and community advocate living in Alice Springs in the Northern Territory.

== Early life ==
Petrick was born in England on 14 February 1924. She trained as a secretary then as a nurse. She came to Australia on a working holiday in 1950 and worked in Sydney, Hobart and Adelaide.

== Life in the Northern Territory ==
Eager to see a cattle station before she returned to England, Petrick came to the Northern Territory in 1951 to be a governess for three months on MacDonald Downs Station, 300 kilometres north-east of Alice Springs. She married Martyn Petrick from nearby Mt Swan Station in 1952 and had two children Suzette and Grant. In 1960, they moved to Neutral Junction Station near Barrow Creek, where Petrick ran the health centre in the community.

When Martyn died in 1974, Petrick moved to Alice Springs and became a journalist with the Centralian Advocate where she was first employed as a junior cadet. She wrote weekly features identifying the town's 100 streets named after Central Australian pioneers. The Centralian Advocate then published the features in a booklet entitled Street Names tell History of Alice Springs and The Story of the Centralian Advocate Alice Springs first newspaper by Robert Watt.

As the town grew more streets were named after pioneers, Aboriginal words and flora. Petrick wrote four more editions of the street name book and included landmarks named after people. The fifth edition, with more than 600 entries, entitled, The History of Alice Springs through Landmarks and Street Names was first published in 2010.

== Later life ==
Petrick was awarded an Order of Australia Medal in January 2000, for the preservation and recording of the history of Alice Springs and for her voluntary work at the Old Timers Home. In June 2000, she carried the Olympic Torch in Alice Springs in what she calls one of her "few moments of glory".

Petrick is a life member of the Alice Springs Running & Walking Club, the National Trust, NT and Heritage Alice Springs Inc. She is a member of Alice Springs Toastmaster's Club, the Probus Club of Stuart and U3A Alice Springs, Inc.

The late Iain Campbell won the prestigious Portrait of a Senior Territorian Art Award in 2009 with his portrait of Petrick.

In 2017 Petrick published her autobiography Bournemouth, the bush and Beyond, which was published by the Historical Society of the Northern Territory.

In 2024 Petrick celebrated her 100th birthday in Alice Springs with a ballet performance. When asked what had changed the most over her lifetime she said "the computers and the mobile phones"; technologies she uses daily.

== Works ==
- Street Names tell History of Alice Springs/The Story of the Centralian Advocate, Alice Springs' first newspaper (1980).
- The Renner diaries (1983)
- The History of Alice Springs through Landmarks and Street Names (1996, 2005, 2010, 2015)
- Kuprilya Springs: Hermannsburg & other things (2007).
- The Robert Czakó Mural, St Mary's Family Services & Beyond (2016)
- Bournemouth, the bush and beyond (2017)
