= Horn expedition =

Expedition to Central Australia

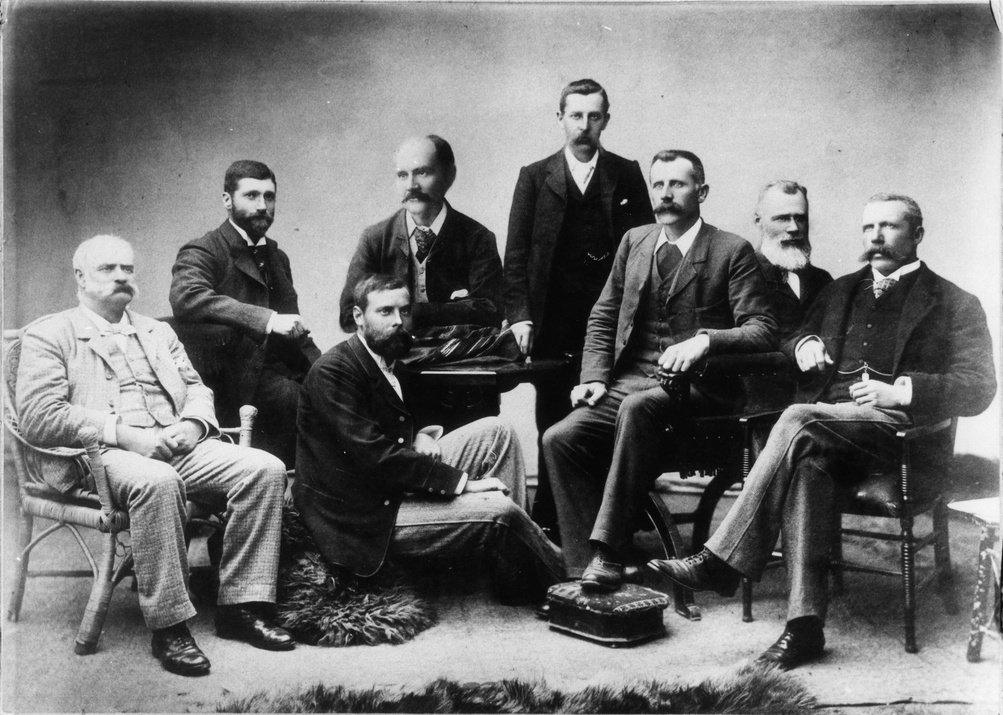
Members of the expedition: Ralph Tate, F. W. Belt, J. A. Watt, W. A. Horn, W. Baldwin Spencer, Charles Winnecke, G. A. Keartland, and E. C. Stirling

The Horn Scientific Expedition was the first primarily scientific expedition to study the natural history of Central Australia, sponsored by three Australian universities (University of Sydney, University of Adelaide and University of Melbourne). It took place from May to August 1894, with expedition members first traveling by train from Adelaide to the railhead at Oodnadatta in South Australia, then using camels for transport to traverse over 3000 km of largely uncharted country from Oodnadatta through the Finke River basin to Alice Springs and the Macdonnell Ranges in the Northern Territory.

The expedition was equipped and sponsored by William Austin Horn, a wealthy pastoralist and mining magnate, who accompanied the expedition in its early stages. The area studied included the country of the Arrernte and Luritja people, whose assistance and goodwill was crucial to the success of the expedition through the provision of natural history specimens, artefacts and information.

== Personnel ==
Members of the expedition, with their responsibilities, included:

- Professor Baldwin Spencer – zoology and photography, who also edited the official account of the expedition for publication
- Dr Edward Charles Stirling – anthropology, who acted as the medical officer
- Professor Ralph Tate – geology and botany
- J. A. Watt – geology and mineralogy
- Charles Winnecke – meteorology, as well as being the surveyor and leader

Other personnel were two collectors, one of whom was ornithologist George Keartland, a cook and four cameleers. Local Aboriginal guides were also used for parts of the expedition, including Arrabai.

Mounted Constable Ernest Cowle led the younger members of the Horn Expedition across the Lake Amadeus saltpan to Uluru and then return across the McDonnell Ranges in June 1894. He became friends with Walter Baldwin Spencer at this time, and later, when serving at Illumurta Springs, collaborated with Spencer and Frank Gillen on their famous work The Native Tribes of Central Australia (1899). Spencer asked that a collector of specimens, J. Field, be honoured in the naming of Pseudomys fieldi, referred to as the Alice Springs mouse until it became locally extinct.

== Achievements ==
Among the achievements of the expedition was the collection and description of new mammal species, some of which are now locally extinct or threatened, including the:

- Fat-tailed false antechinus
- Sandhill dunnart
- Stripe-faced dunnart
- Kowari
- Central rock rat
- Shark Bay mouse
- Sandy inland mouse
- Spinifex hopping mouse

The expedition was the first to collect fishes from central Australia. New species were described as well as new records made of others. Findings included the lack of evidence for aestivation by desert fish and the importance of flooding for dispersal. Also the 1894 Horn Expedition and its report were of crucial importance to the development of Australian herpetology.
