= Standley Chasm =

Geological formation

- Type: Geological Formation

Location
- Coordinates: 23.722°S 133.470°E

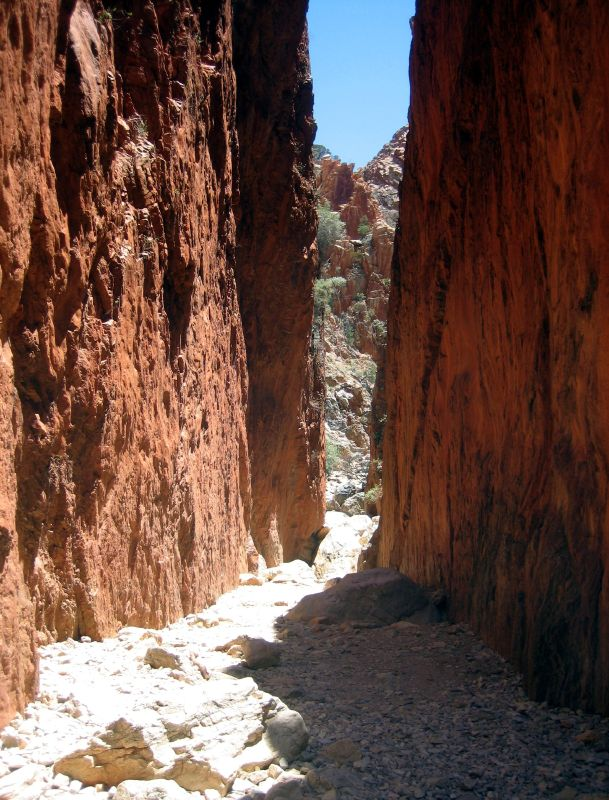

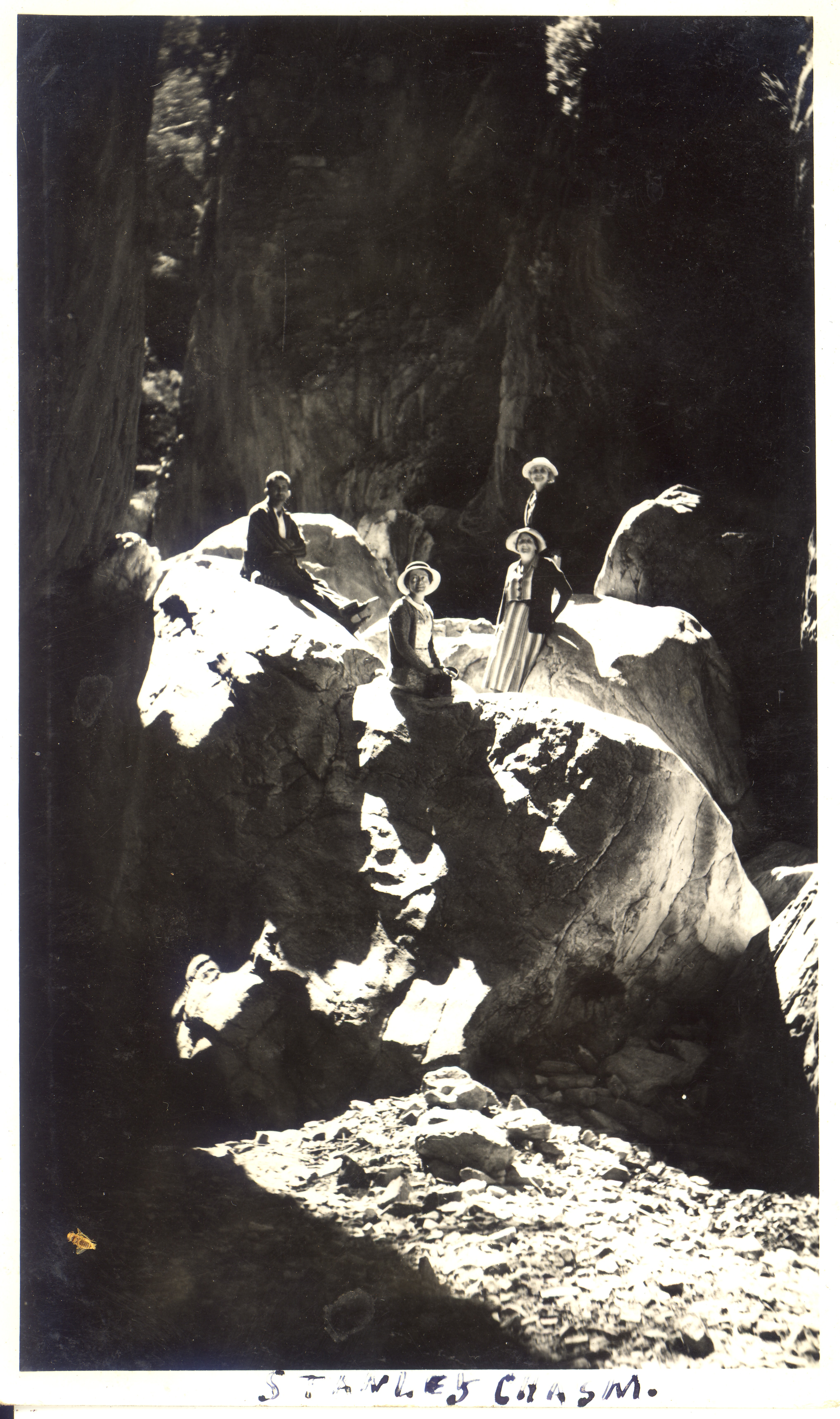
A group of people standing inside Standley Chasm, 1938 - 1948

Standley Chasm is a geological formation located west of Alice Springs in the Northern Territory. It lies within the West MacDonnell National Park. The Western Arrernte Aboriginal people are its original occupiers. It is traditionally known as Angkerle Atwatye, meaning the Gap of Water. Standley Chasm is located in a reserve privately owned by the Iwupataka Land Trust.

The first European name for the formation was Gall Springs after the third manager of Owen Springs Station which once held the title over this land. When used for pastoral purposes the chasm was a major watering site for cattle. The Government excised this section of Owen Springs as part of Jay Creek Settlement for use by The Bungalow and, soon after, it was renamed Standley Chasm in honour of Ida Standley, the first school teacher in Alice Springs and matron of The Bungalow The suggestion for renaming the site came from Ernest Eugene Kramer who was impressed by the scenic grandeur and wanted it to come to public attention.

The chasm is generally in shade for most of the day, but changes colour around noon when the sun is directly overhead, making this the most popular time of the day to visit.

Standley Chasm is a trailhead for the Larapinta Trail, a walking track from Mount Sonder to Alice Springs.
