= Jay Creek, Northern Territory =

Human settlement in Northern Territory, Australia

Coordinates: 23°45′00″S 133°31′01″E

Jay Creek or Iwupataka is in the MacDonnell Ranges 45 kilometres (28 mi) west of Alice Springs in the Northern Territory in Australia. It was once the home of The Bungalow and, as such, is strongly associated with the Stolen Generations.

The settlement is now largely abandoned and is considered a ghost town and it is a significant site for many Aboriginal people who were sent to The Bungalow or later sent there when it became a Reserve and their descendants. This includes many Arrernte, Luritja and Pitjantjatjara people.

== History ==
The site of Jay Creek was initially part of the Owen Springs Station lease and the land was excised by the government in February 1925 the move children then staying at The Bungalow in Alice Springs (Mparntwe) before the completion of the extension of the railway line between Oodnadatta and the town. Government officials wanted to be sure that the children, and in particular the girls, were away from the influx of construction workers on the project. There were delays in preparing the site that mostly related to the inability to ensure sufficient water access and it was not until November 1928 that the children (45 in total; 37 who were under the age of 12) were moved there alongside Ida Standley and Topsy Smith who worked there. Both were reluctant to move to the site and were housed in tents throughout the hot summer.

Standley's heath deteriorated while at Jay Creek and, experiencing serious heart problems, she retired in March 1929 and was replaced by Ernest Kramer and his wife Euphemia (Effie) who had already been assisting her there; they were associated with the Aborigines' Friends' Association.

Another worker for The Bungalow that lived with them there at Jay Creek was Hetty Perkins, she worked there in order to be able to stay with her younger children, who were in the care of the Institution, and she gave birth to another child there, named May, in 1931. While there she worked as the 'senior dormitory girl'.

In 1932 there were 57 children at Jay Creek and this rose to 100 following the arrival of a group of boys from Pine Creek Home. The girls were all expected to complete domestic work and dressmaking and, additionally the older girls were responsible for caring for the younger children and making sure that they were cleaned and changed. The boys were expected to carry water, as water continued to be an issue on site, cut wood and act as goat herds.

In 1932 The Bungalow returned again to Alice Springs, to the former Alice Springs Telegraph Station, and then was declared as one of three permanent camps or reserves for the Aboriginal population of Alice Springs It was intended to be a buffer between the semi-nomadic people living in far western regions and the more sophisticated inhabitants of Alice Springs and environs, in particular for the non-working, aged and infirm people living in the area.

In the late 1960s, following the creation of Amoonguna Community the population at Jay Creek declined and was uninhabited by the late 1980s.

== Current use ==
There are a number of remains at the site including the former home of Ted Strehlow, a church (which Moses Tjalkabota once led), a cemetery and pre-fabricated buildings that were built in the late-1940s and throughout the 1950s .

In 2017 major restoration works were undertaken by Central Land Council at the cemetery, in which at least 64 people had been buried. Before restoration works only 7 of the graves were ever marked and the names of the people buried there were unknown and, in the process of restoration a further 38 graves were able to be identified.

While the old township site remains unused the area is also home to a depot for Ingerreke Outstation Resource Services and there are a number of Homelands and outstations nearby.

== Gallery ==
Horses at the Jay Creek waterhole in the 1920s

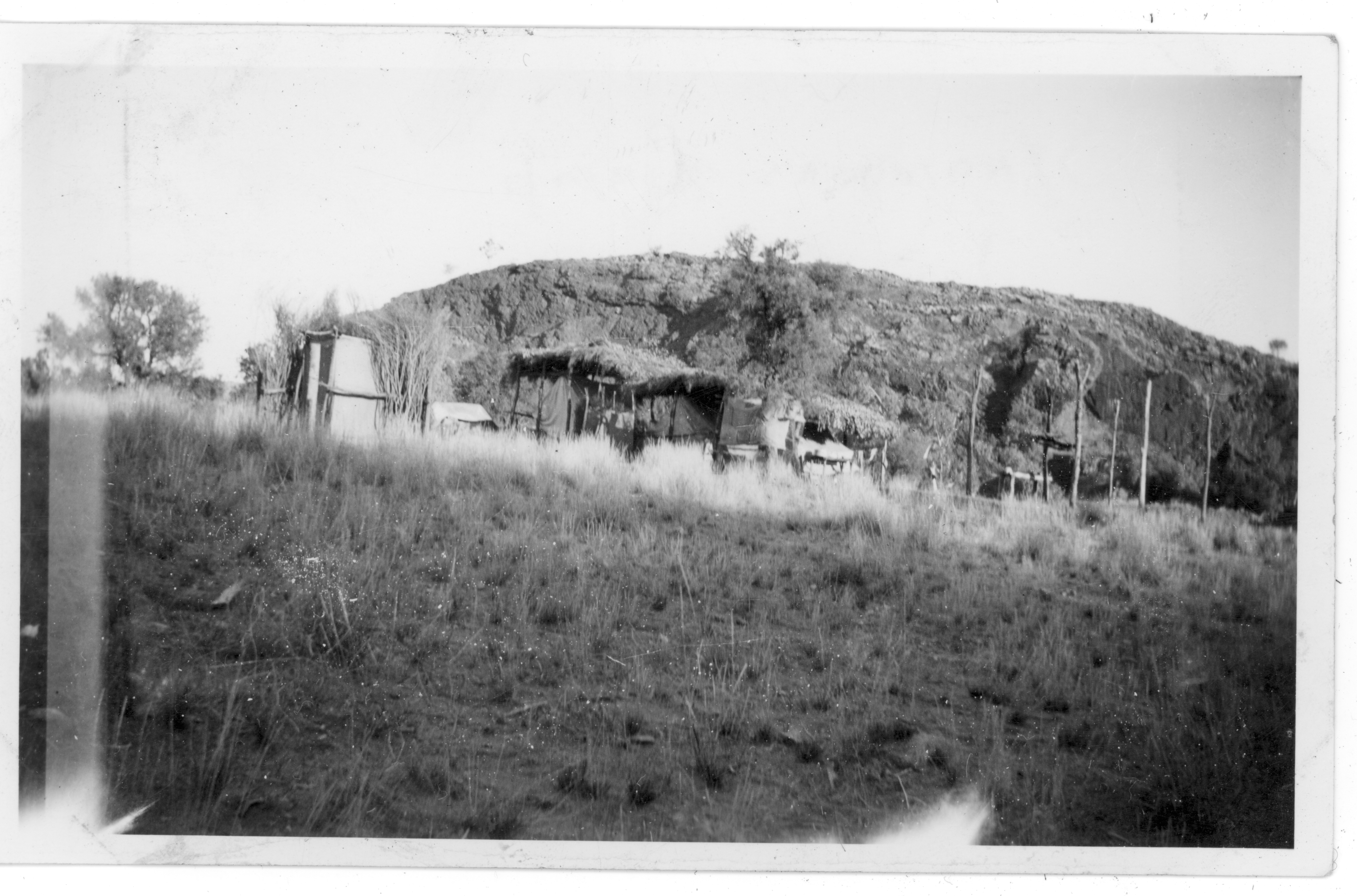
The housing at Jay Creek in 1937 or 1938

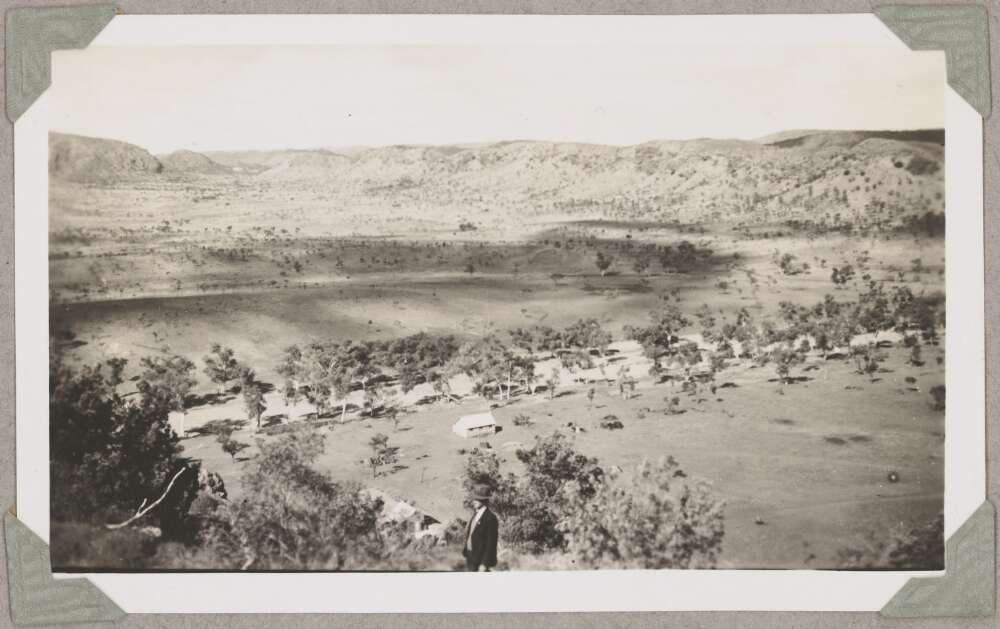
View of buildings at Jay Creek (Iwupataka), ca. 1946

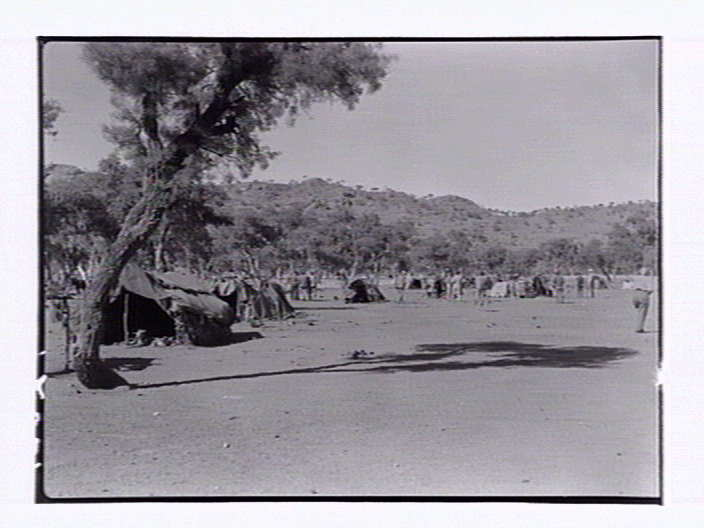
Jay Creek in 1947

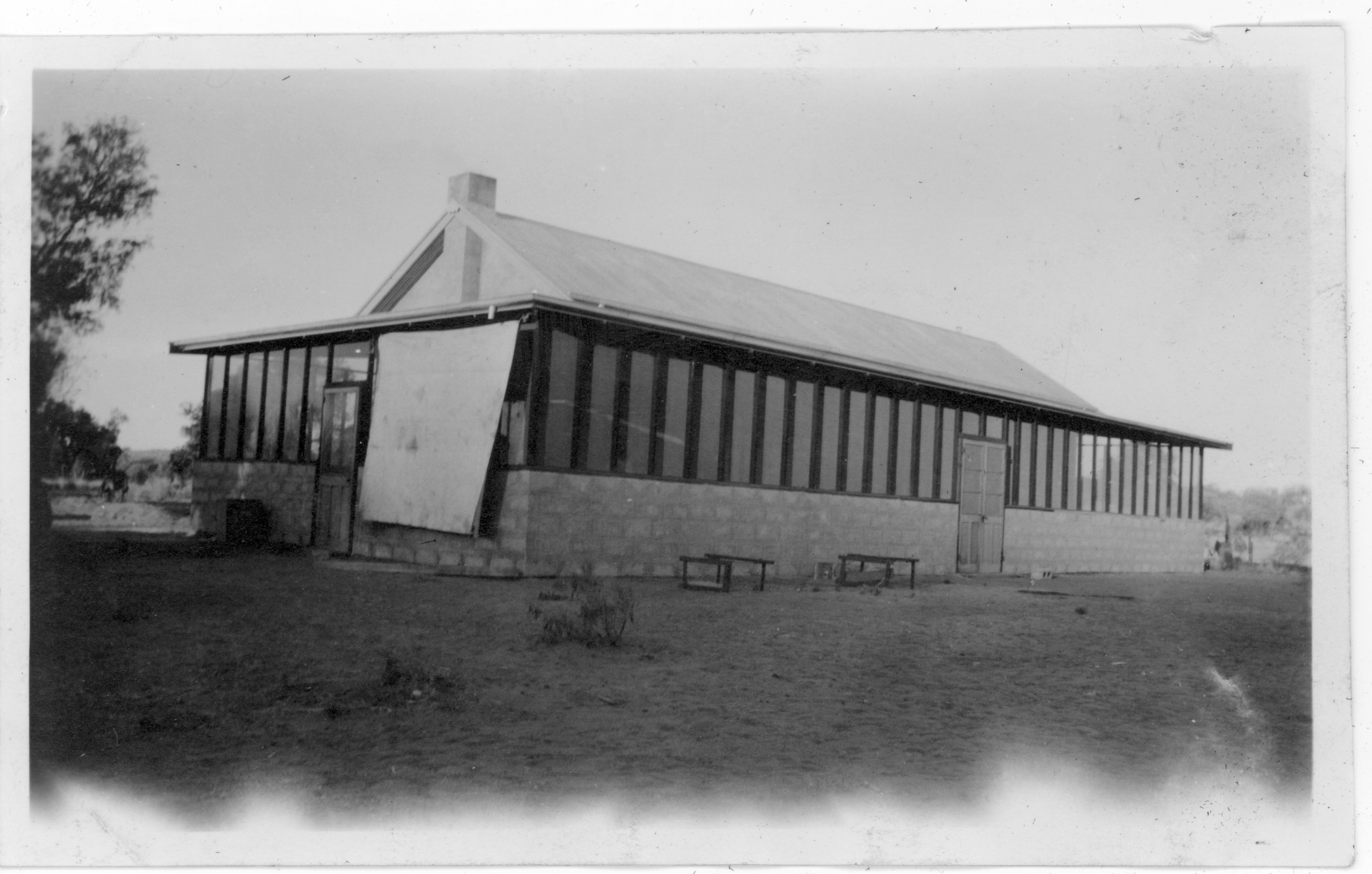
Ted Strehlow's house in Jay Creek constructed in the 1930s
