= Alec Ross (tour guide) =

Alec Donald Ross OAM (6 April 1936 – 30 March 2017) was an Australian tour guide, member of the stolen generation and custodian of the story of the Alice Springs Telegraph Station in the Northern Territory of Australia.

== Early life ==
Ross was born on 6 April 1936 at Mosquito Creek near Barrow Creek at Neutral Junction Station the son of the Scottish cattle station owner. Ross is the great-grandson of explorer John Ross, who came to Central Australia as part of the surveying teams for the Overland Telegraph Line, its most famous repeater station, the place where his great-grandson Alec later worked for a large part of his life. He fell seriously ill at the age of three and was taken from his mother to The Bungalow, an institution for part-Aboriginal children based near the telegraph station in Alice Springs. He lived there for most of his childhood, attending school.

Ross was moved to Croker Island in 1941. When the Japanese started bombing northern Australia in 1942, he and the other children, walked from Barklay Bay on the Arnhem Land coast right to Pine Creek through the bush. From there he was transferred to Alice Springs where he took the train to Adelaide and on to Sydney. He was then returned to Croker Island after the war, but when he was old enough returned to Sydney. He was eventually reunited with his mother, just two years before she died. Of the meeting he said:

The truth is that I only felt sad for my mother. There was no bond of any type there because we just didn't know each other.

== Working life ==
Ross married in 1994, and although separated, remained good friends with his wife.

Ross worked as a tour guide at the Alice Springs Telegraph Station. He retired in 2004 but returned for special events. He then worked as a house parent at Wangkana Kari Aboriginal Hostel in Tennant Creek.

== Legacy ==
Ross was awarded an Order of Australia in 2013. He is the subject of a book, Alec, A Living History of the Alice Springs Telegraph Station by Shirley Brown.

Ross died on 30 March 2017 and is buried at the Alice Springs Garden Cemetery.
