= Joseph Croft =

Australian Aboriginal activist (c. 1925–1996)

Joseph "Joe" Croft (c.1925 - 22 August 1996) was a Gurindji and Mudburra man who was a member of the Stolen Generations who spent his early childhood in government institutions and, in 1944, he became the first Aboriginal person to attend an Australian University.

Throughout his life he was an Aboriginal activist and advocated for Indigenous rights throughout his life.

== Biography ==
Joseph Croft was born at Victoria River Downs Station to Bessie (sometime recorded as Bessy), a Gurindji-Mudburra/Chinese woman, and Joe Croft who was of Irish-Scottish heritage. His father was also known as "Handsome Joe" who worked on the station as a cook, gardener and station hand.

On 1 July 1927 Tom Hemmings, a Mounted Constable from the Northern Territory Police Force, visited the station and took Bessie and Croft from there to the Myilly Point Home, which was just outside the fence of the nearby to the Kahlin Compound in Darwin; Croft said one of his few memories of this was his mother crying. At this home Croft was able to stay with his mother until 1931, when he was approximately 6 years-old, and he was transferred, along with 27 other boys, to the Pine Creek Home in Pine Creek. Then, when the home closed in 1933, Croft was sent to The Bungalow in Alice Springs; another child who was also transferred was Alec Kruger.

While at The Bungalow Croft did well in his classes and received high marks in the 1939 qualifying certificate examinations and in 1940, with the support of Father Percy Smith and his teacher Wally Boehm, won a government scholarship to attend All Souls' School in Charters Towers. This was the first time that students from The Bungalow had been able to sit for these examinations and the scholarship was one of only two offered to Northern Territory students and, at that time the Northern Territory had no secondary schools of its own; Tony Austin (2000) said this was "no doubt to the dismay of white residents [of Alice Springs]". At All Souls' Croft was the first Aboriginal student and during his final year in 1943 he was school captain as well as being captain of the football, cricket and swimming teams.

After the completion of his schooling Croft received a Commonwealth bursary to attend the University of Queensland in 1944 where he enrolled in an engineering degree and, as the first Aboriginal student this received national press coverage. Croft was inspired to study engineering by childhood memories at Pine Creek watching the trains go by. Despite this, he felt unsettled at university, in the midst of World War II, and said of it:

I had this feeling that I wanted to be out there, defending the country, my country. So, I didn't do my studies that year, I played a lot of sport … [and] when the results came out I didn't do too good, so I joined the army.

— Joe Croft, Oral history interviews in Alice Springs, Wattie Creek and Darwin, NT, 1989

On 3 March 1945, at Townsville, Croft enlisted in the Second Australian Imperial Force and completed infantry training and was appointed lance corporal a month before the war ended. He was discharged on 30 September 1946 and returned to university in 1947 but left soon after without completing his degree. He then worked in various jobs, including cane cutting, until 1950.

From 1950 to 1971 he became a contracting surveyor, using skills that drew from his engineering studies, on dam building and railway line rebuilding projects. In 1959 when working of the Snowy Mountains Scheme he met Dorothy Jean Stone whom he would later marry on 9 June 1962. Soon after their marriage they moved to Perth together as Croft had been appointed a surveyor on the Perth-Kalgoorlie railway and their first two children, Brenda (1964) and Lindsay (1967), were born there and their third child Timothy (1971) was born in Lismore.

For many years Croft had been working under the assumption that his mother, Bessie had died, as he had ceased receiving letters from her in 1940, when he had left The Bungalow. He had not been told that she had been evacuated from Darwin following the bombing of Darwin and had no longer been able to contact him. However, when his family again moved to the Northern Rivers region in 1968 and, when needing a copy of his birth certificate to apply for a loan, he wrote to Harry Giese, Director of Welfare in the Northern Territory, and found that his mother was alive and was working as a laundress at the Retta Dixon Home. Croft was also told that he had a number of siblings. After the finding out that his mother was alive, Croft was able to begin a correspondence with his her via Amelia Shankleton, a missionary at the home.

In 1972 the family purchased a newsagency at Woodburn and, during this time, Croft worked closely with the Bundjalung people living at Cabbage Tree Island and helped establish an arts and craft business. He would sell these works, and other works from the Northern Territory, at the newsagency. In 1972 Dorothy won second prize in a Mother's Day writing competition for New Idea in which she told Croft's story of being separated from his mother; her prize for this competition win was a telephone call which allowed Croft to speak to Bessie for the first time in 30 years. Soon after, in early in 1974, they were able to visit her for the first time and spent three weeks staying with her; she died in December that year.

In 1975 Croft began working for the Department of Aboriginal Affairs in Canberra as a liaison officer and later began working for the Aboriginal Development Commission. In the late-1970s he was seconded to serve on the Anti-Discrimination Board of NSW here he worked with Al Grassby. In this role he travelled extensively to assess cases and worked closely with Aboriginal communities and individuals throughout Australia. A series of other roles in the public sector followed, including as the treasurer of the ACT Koories Club (later known as the Aboriginal Corporation for Sporting and Recreational Activities), which was chaired by his friend and fellow former Bungalow resident Charles Perkins.

Croft maintained his interest in Indigenous Australian art and organised exhibitions at venues around Canberra, including an exhibition of work from Maningrida at the Canberra School of Art in July 1983. He also toured nationally and internationally with the Ramingining dance group, including David Gulpilil and Bobby Bunungurr in the mid-1980s.

Croft retired from the public service in June 1988, relocated to Sydney, and continued his work in the art sector. He said of this:

Art and culture is what it all means [to be Aboriginal], I feel please to be helping Aboriginal people at grass-roots level by showing Australian's something of the art and culture of my people.

— Joe Croft, as quoted in the Canberra Times, 9 September 1988

Croft and Dorothy divorced in 1991 and, in April 1992 he married Patricia and moved to Springwood. Later, following a significant injury for which he had to remain in hospital for over a year, he entered aged care and died of Leukemia on 22 July 1996. He was buried at the Kalkarindji cemetery.

== Legacy ==
- A portrait of Croft, alongside his daughter Brenda L Croft is held by the National Portrait Gallery (Australia).
- The Joseph (Joe) Croft Indigenous Award was established in 2015 at St John's Collage at the University of Queensland to support Indigenous students.
- The Joseph and Lindsay Croft memorial scholarship at the Australian National University; this scholarship also honours his son Lindsay who was killed in a car accident on 3 August 1996.
- Joe Croft Street in Bonner, Australian Capital Territory is named for him.
