= Topsy Smith =

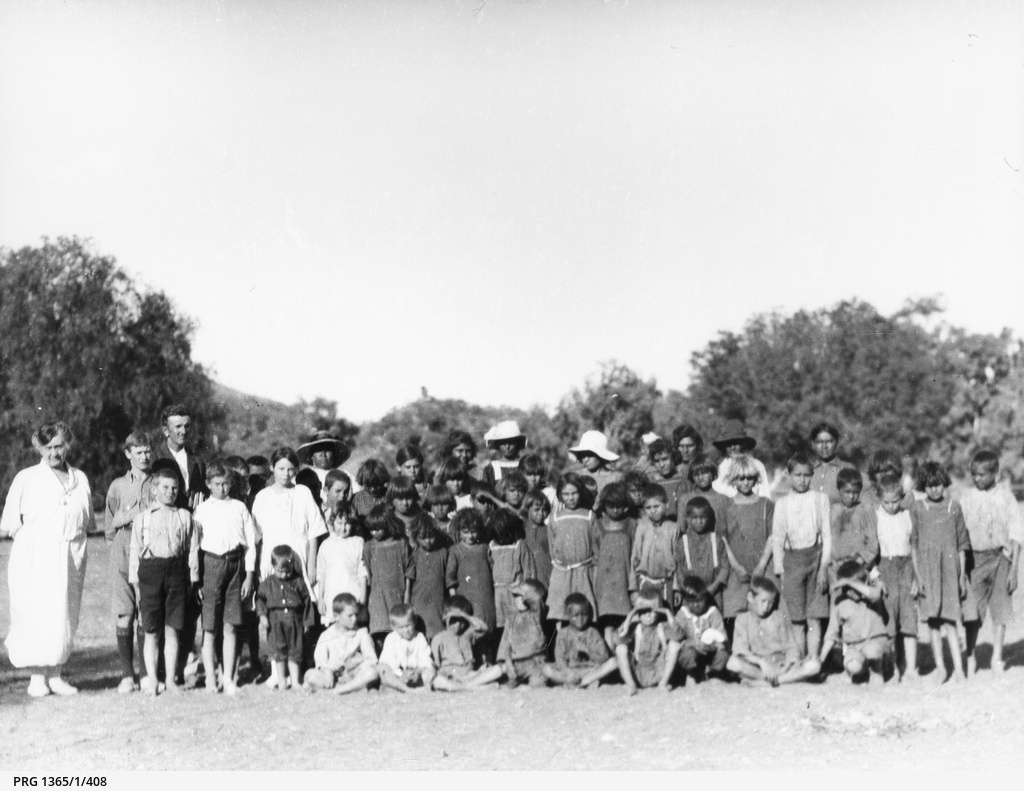
Topsy Smith stands at the back, seventh from the right.

Topsy Smith (c.1875 – 15 April 1960) was an Arabana pioneer of Central Australia in the Northern Territory. She spent her life caring for Indigenous children at an institution known as The Bungalow in Alice Springs.

== Early life, marriage and children ==
Topsy Smith was born around 1875, the daughter of Mary Kemp, who was of Arabana descent, from the Oodnadatta area, in northeast South Australia. Her father was policeman George White but he did not play a large role in her life as she as mostly raised by her mother and her step-father Arthur Evans. The couple had a variety of jobs together, including running a store at Alice Well, until Arthur 'got respectable' and left Mary to marry a white woman.

In the early 1890s Smith married a Welsh miner William "Bill" Smith and they headed north to the Arltunga goldfields. They had eleven children, the eldest of whom was bushman Walter Smith who was born in 1893. Bill died on 20 May 1914, and finding it increasingly hard to find gold, Smith decided to return to the Oodnadatta area, but only made it as far as Alice Springs, then known as Stuart. She was pregnant at the time and was accompanied by seven of her children and a herd of several hundred goats. Walter remained in Arltunga to work.

Topsy and her children were assisted by pastoralists Jane and Ted Hayes from Undoolya Station, with whom they lived for some time before moving on to Alice Springs. When she arrived in Alice Springs, Smith lived in a tent. She herded her goats on a hill which was then the outskirts of town, a place that became known as Billy Goat Hill; these goats were later confiscated from her and some placed at The Bungalow to provide the children with milk and meat while others were used to feed prisoners at Stuart Town Gaol. No compensation was provided for these goats which were a considerable asset.

== The Bungalow ==
Eventually the sergeant of police Robert Stott constructed a shed where she was permitted to live. The shed eventually became known as The Bungalow, an institution and school for Aboriginal children of mixed descent (at the time, referred to as "half-caste"). She was soon joined by another woman, Mariah McDonald, and her four children and numbers rose as children, removed from their parents, were picked up for Aboriginal camps and placed there. Two additional iron sheds where added and, in February 1915, they were joined by school teacher and eventual matron of The Bungalow, Ida Standley.

Smith was involved in all aspects of the Institution's operation and management and was responsible for the children's welfare. She was known to have cared for the children as her own.

The school was moved from its location in town to Jay Creek in 1928. By this time Smith had had enough and wanted to return to Oodnadatta, her mother's country, but she was prevailed upon to stay through the move where she lived in a tent under a bough shelter throughout summer. She would retire from here in around 1929 and her daughter, Ada Wade, helped her travel home to her elderly mother Mary. She would return to Alice Springs some time later.

Smith received no pay for her work at The Bungalow, just her keep and her contributions were largely overlooked (she did not receive an MBE like her colleague Ida Standley); there are hardly any references to her in the government records of the day.

== Death and legacy ==
Smith died at the Alice Springs hospital after a long illness on 15 April 1960. She is celebrated in the Women's Museum of Australia in Alice Springs.

The Topsy Smith Hostel in Alice Springs, which provides long-term accommodation for Aboriginal and Torres Strait Islander renal patients and their carers, is named after her.

Topsy Smith House, a house at St Philip's College, a private school in Alice Springs, is named after her.

A painting of Smith entitled Arltunga to Alice by her great granddaughter, artist Linda Smith Penangke, was a finalist in the 2010 Moreton Bay Region Art Award.
