= Billy Goat Hill (Alice Springs) =

Hill in Northern Territory, Australia

- Akeyulerre
- Location within Northern Territory

Highest point
- Coordinates: 23°42′08″S 133°52′39″E

Geography
- Location: Alice Springs, Northern Territory, Australia

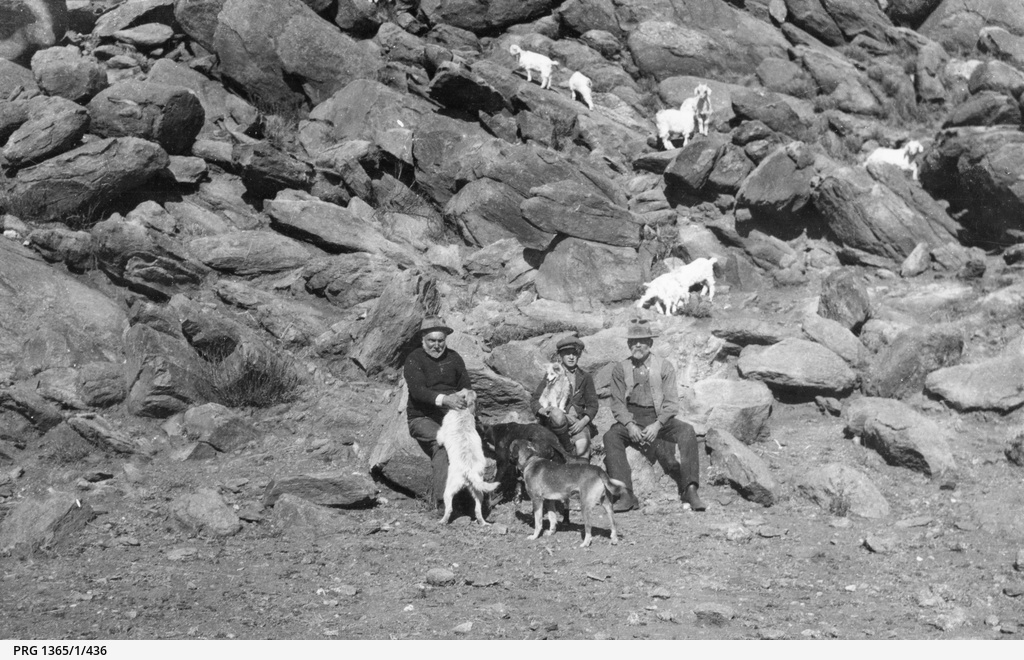
Men and goats in front of Billy Goat Hill in 1924

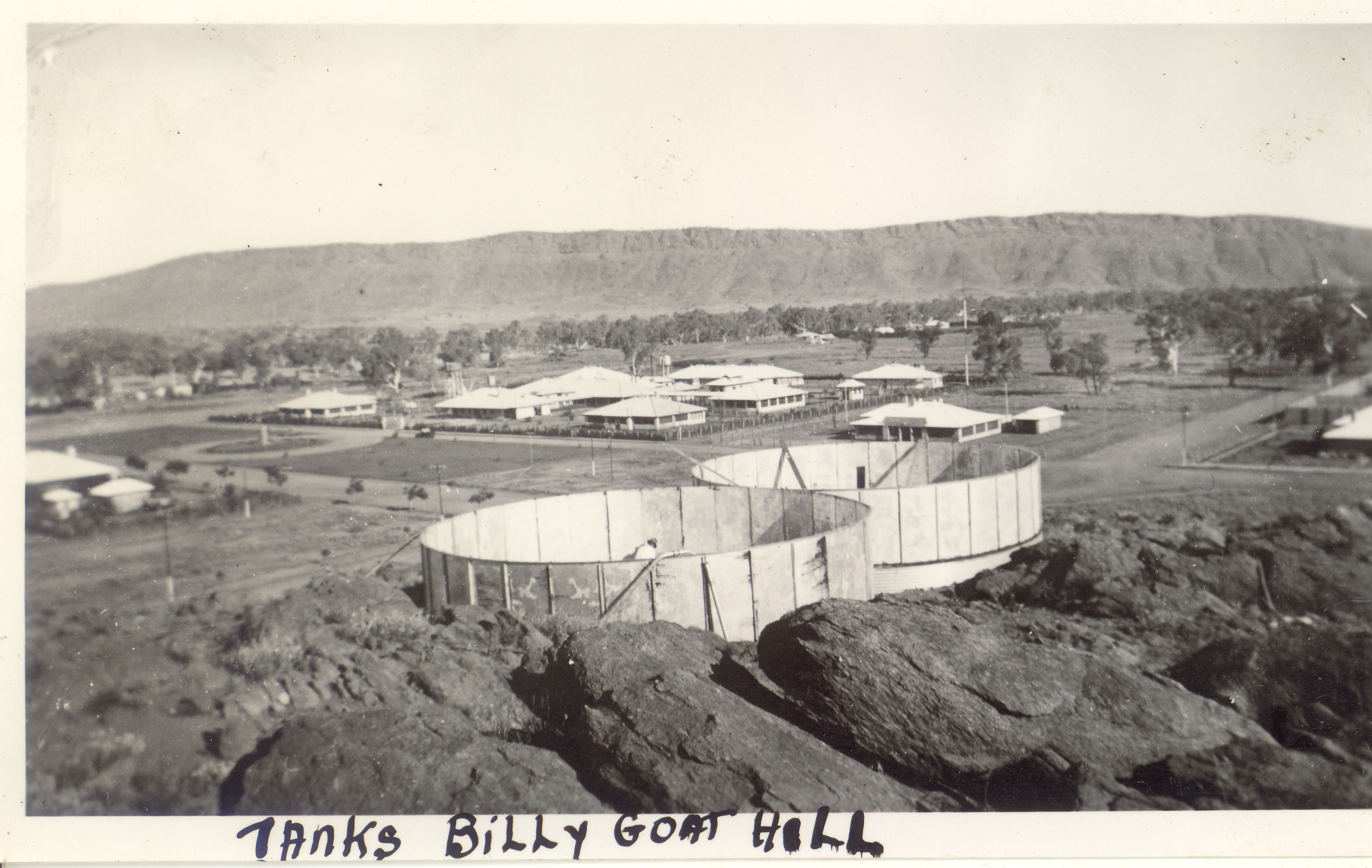
Water tanks were constructed on top of Billy Goat Hill during WWII

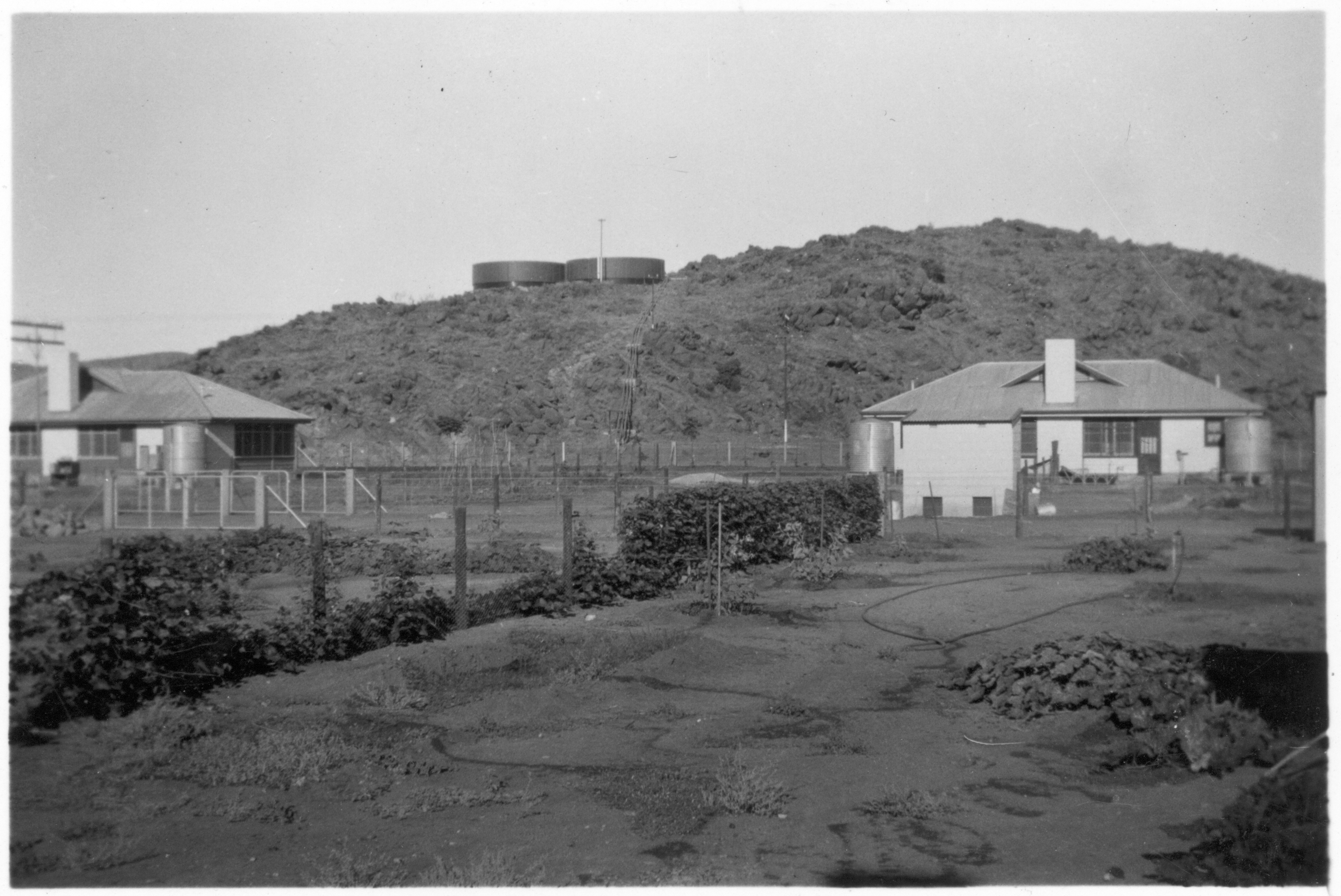
A rear view of Billy Goat Hill in 1941 or 1942, image shows water tanks

Billy Goat Hill, or Akeyulerre, (in Arrernte) is located in Alice Springs (Mparntwe) in the Northern Territory of Australia and, together with the nearby ANZAC Hill (Atnelkentyarliweke), has important Dreaming associations include two sisters, alongside uninitiated boys, who were travelling north and were engaged in flirtatious and humorous behaviour these sites; further north these interactions became violent.

These two hills are the most prominent in the Central Business District of Alice Springs and, as such have been extensively used by Europeans and, as such, Billy Goat Hill is now very close to major roads and, for many years, housed the towns water towers.

== History ==
Billy Goat Hill, the English language name, is named for the billy goats that travelled in to town with Arabana woman, Topsy Smith, who briefly lived at the site before starting working at The Bungalow. Smith moved to Alice Springs, then Stuart, in 1914 after the death of her husband at Arltunga and brought with her a herd of several hundred goats who were allowed to graze on the edge of town and where often seen atop, what became known as, Billy Goat Hill.

During World War II the Australian government poured military and civilian manpower into Alice Springs and, in 1940, they built water tanks on top of Billy Goat Hill. These tanks were built by the "Native labour gangs" employed by the army. These water tanks supplied running water to the new hospital and nearby government houses and it was the first time there was running water in the town. These tanks have since been removed.

== See also ==
Akeyulerre Healing Centre, an Arrernte fee-for service health service located at the base of Billy Goat Hill.
