= Ida Standley =

Australian school teacher (1869–1948)

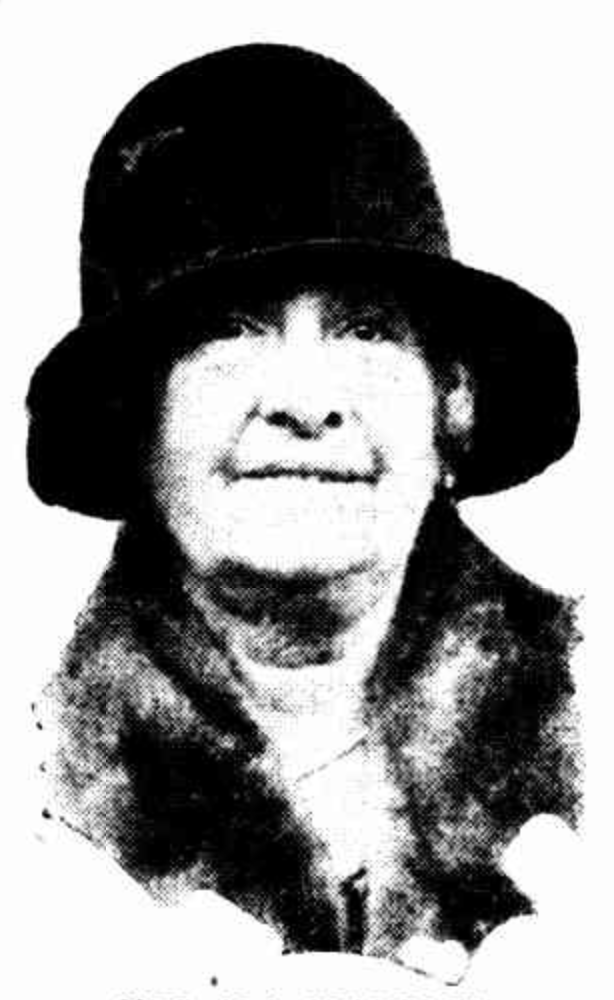
Ida Standley

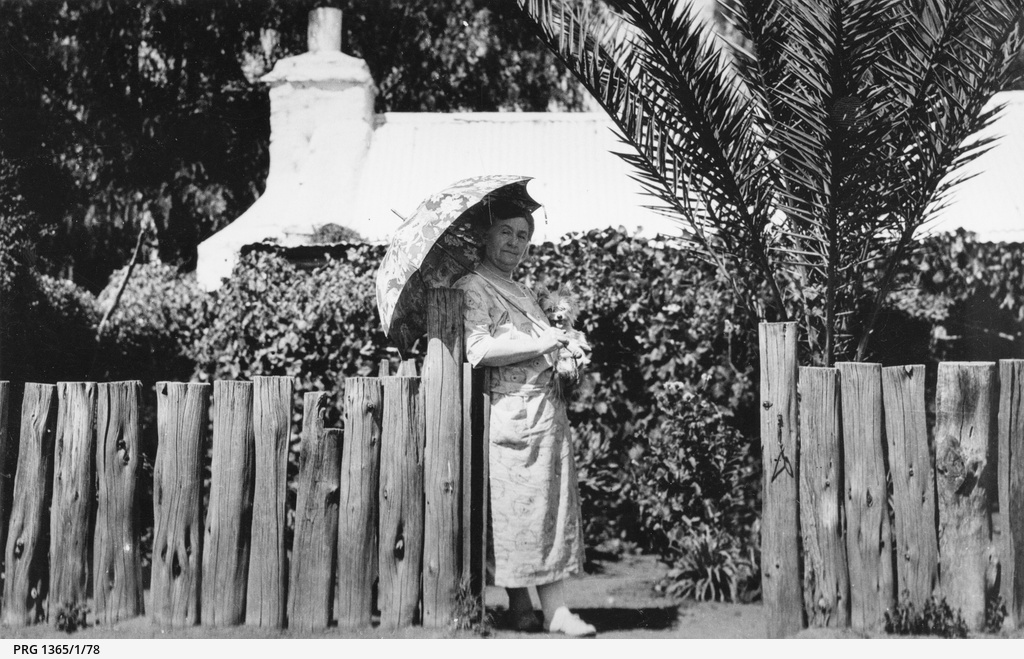
Ida Standley in 1922 in front of Myrte Villa.

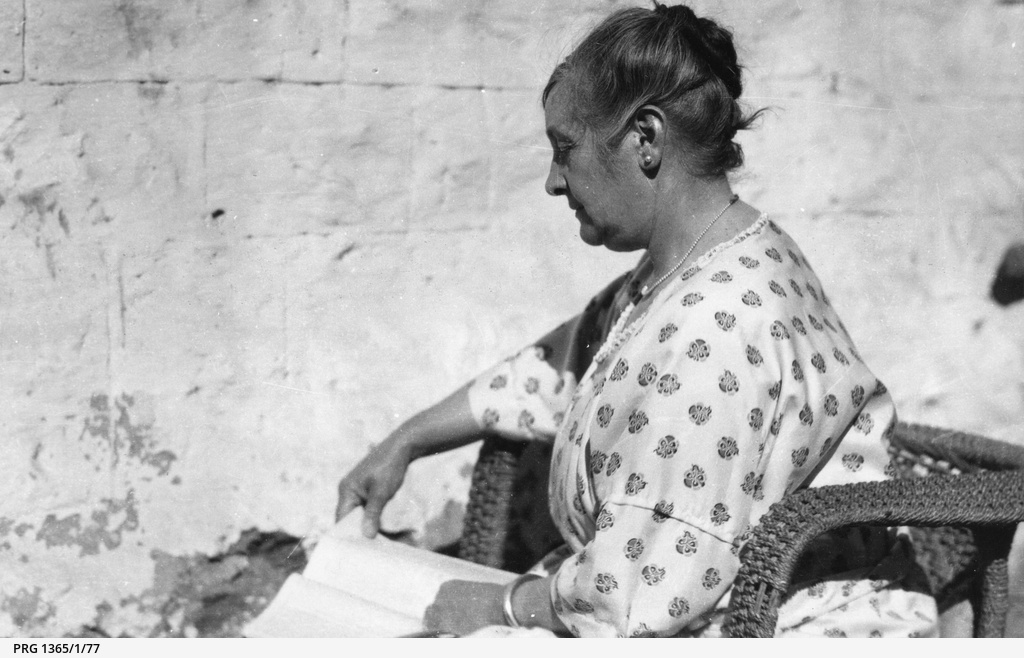
Ida Standley reading in 1922

Ida Standley MBE (19 January 1869 – 29 May 1948) was the first school teacher in Alice Springs, Australia. For 15 years, from 1914 to 1929, she worked at The Bungalow. Standley was appointed MBE for her services to children's welfare.

== Early life ==
Ida Standley was born Ida Woodcock on 19 January 1869 in Adelaide. She was one of the six children of Hanson Woodcock, a butcher, and his wife Bertha. She was educated at Misses Lucy and Florence Tilley's Hardwicke House Ladies' College and, then became a governess to the Standley family at Mount Wudinna Station on the Eyre Peninsula. Here she met her 35 year old farmer husband, George Standley, whom she married on 12 August 1887 when she was 18. The couple had four children together before their marriage ended; around 1903. During their marriage Ida became a teacher and worked in a handful of one-teacher schools.

In 1914 in South Australian Education Department advertised for a female teacher in Alice Springs, then Stuart, and no one applied until parents in the area agreed to provide additional support to the teacher to cover the cost of board and washing. With that promise, in May 1914, she made the difficult journey to Alice Springs by catching the train to Oodnadatta and then being escorted by police constable, Harry 'Trot' Kunoth (who would later marry Amelia Kunoth), and linesman, Will Fox, on a 14-day buggy journey the final 800 km.

== Life in the Northern Territory ==
Upon arrival in Alice Springs, for lack of other options Ida first stayed in the police house with Robert Stott and his family. The school was established in a stone hut at the side of the Stuart Town Gaol which had been used as a rations store. Harry Kunoth assisted Standley by, with the help of Aboriginal workers, adding windows and a veranda to the building to make it more habitable.

From the beginning the European children were taught from 9:00 am to 12:30 pm and the 'half-caste' Aboriginal children, who lived at The Bungalow, from 3:00 pm to 4:30 pm. The Bungalow was established in 1914 and the children were under the care of Topsy Smith until, by early 1915, Standley was asked to provide additional supervision outside of the hours of tuition for a small additional sum.

Soon the additional funding promised by the parents started to break down with some parents being unable to pay and others leaving the district. There was, however, an element of racism involved with many parents and other community members that the 'Europeans' were contributing to her upkeep when the majority of her students were Aboriginal.

Standley was considered unique in her belief that "[a]ll children have essentially the same heart, the same natures" and that, her students of all 'types' were "quite up to average, and, in fact, one or two were more than ordinarily bright". She received criticism when she made Dempsey Hong (son of Ah Hong) a Chinese-Aboriginal boy head of the 'European' class. In 1915 she sent a letter to the Minister of Home and Territories including a hand drawn map of Australia prepared by him and showing her approval.

Standley and Smith worked together closely at the Bungalow, behind the Stuart Arms Hotel, for many years until, in November 1928, the school were moved out of town to what is now the Jay Creek Settlement. Interestingly during a period of time (1917 - 1921) that The Bungalow was located at the rear of the hotel the lease-holder was Vivian Rose Browne, Standley's youngest daughter, whose husband Leonard Percival Browne held the licence. By the time of this move Standley was in poor health and had wanted to retire in January 1929, her 60th birthday, but was convinced to remain until a suitable replacement could be found. In the new, very poor living conditions at Jay Creek (where she spent a summer living in a tent), her health deteriorated and she was experiencing serious heart problems and she was finally able to retire at the end of 1939. She was replaced by Ernest Eugene Kramer and his wife Euphemia; this was designed to be a temporary replacement. The Kramer's admired Standley and the work that she had done and it was them who advocated for Standley Chasm, which had previously been known as Gall Springs, to be renamed in her honour; this is located nearby Jay Creek.

This decision as reinforced when, in January 1929, she was reprimended by the Chief Protector Charles Herbert Noblet for traveling to Alice Springs without first asking his permission.

Ida was made a member of the Order of the British Empire (MBE) in November 1929 for her services. Her colleague Topsy Smith received no such recognition

== Later life ==
Ida Standley died on 29 May 1948 at Manly in Sydney and was buried, with catholic rites, at Frenchs Forest.

== Legacy ==
Ida is remembered for her hard work, efficiency, compassion and the affection she conveyed for the children in her care; many of whom called her 'Mum'.

The following places in Alice Springs and surrounds are named after her:

- Standley Chasm
- Ida Standley Preschool
- Standley Crescent
- Ida Street
