= Silas Ngulati Roberts =

Indigenous Australian preacher (1925–1983)

Silas Ngulati Roberts OBE (1925 – 17 May 1983) was an Alawa man who was born at Ngukurr in the Northern Territory of Australia. He was a Methodist lay preacher and a leader of his people who had extensive involvement in Land Rights; including as the first chairman of Northern Land Council.

== Biography ==
Roberts is the son of Barnabas (also recorded as Gabarla) and Norah Roberts and he is one of five children; two of his siblings are Phillip Waipuldanya Roberts and Mercia Butler.

Roberts, unlike his sister Mercia Butler, was able to grow up with his father and brothers at the Roper River Mission and, later married a woman named Rosie and they had seven children together. For many years, he was employed as the launch master there with a significant amount of responsibly.

In 1963 Roberts moved with his family to Maningrida where the Northern Territory Government were developing a fishing project; here he worked firstly with the Fisheries Branch and then with the Welfare Branch on this project. He soon became a community leader there and served as the president of the Maningrida Progress Association and the local housing association. Additionally he began serving as a Methodist lay preacher to the town. He was recognised by many for being calm, thoughtful and articulate.

On 18 September 1974 he was appointed as a justice of the peace and special magistrate there and, in so doing, was the first Aboriginal person to hold these appointments in the Northern Territory. He held these positions there until 1981.

Following the establishment of the Northern Land Council in 1974 Roberts served as its first chairman and led the organisation through its first few years and throughout a difficult period before the Aboriginal Land Rights Act 1976 was developed. In 1978 Robert was awarded the Order of Australia Medal for his "service in the field of Aboriginal welfare".

In 1981 Roberts decided to return to Ngukurr, his traditional home, and on 31 March 1982 was there to open the new Roper River Police Station at the request of the Northern Territory Government. He was also employed there by the Department of Aboriginal Affairs and helped in the establishment of a number of outstations in the areas surrounding Ngukurr.

He died on 17 May 1983 at the age of 58. A tribute to Roberts was made in the Northern Territory Legislative Assembly by the then Chief Minister Paul Everingham who recognised him as a well respected leader, both within his own community, and throughout the Northern Territory. He stated:

Mr Roberts showed great understanding of both the problems of his own people, and the problems of his own people, he was an active campaigner for land rights during the 1960s and early 70s, before land rights were introduced in the Northern Territory

— Paul Everingham, Tribute to Mr Silas Roberts, Press release (19 May 1983)

== Legacy ==
His name is remembered in the naming of the Silas Roberts Hostel.

A collection of Biographical cuttings on Silas Roberts are available at the National Library of Australia.
