= Brenda L Croft =

Aboriginal Australian artist, curator, writer and educator

Brenda L. Croft (born 1964) is an Aboriginal Australian artist, curator, writer, and educator working across contemporary Indigenous and mainstream arts and cultural sectors. Croft was a founding member of the Boomalli Aboriginal Artists Cooperative in 1987.

== Early life and education ==
Croft was born in 1964 in Perth and is from the Gurindji, Malngin and Mudburra peoples, as well as having Anglo-Australian/German/Irish/Chinese heritage. She is the daughter of Joseph (Joe) Croft.

Croft took her first photograph in December 1974 on her mother's Box Brownie.

She completed the first year of a Bachelor of Arts degree from Sydney College of Arts, University of Sydney in 1985. The degree remained incomplete when Croft commenced voluntary work in community activism and public radio (Radio Redfern/Radio Skid Row, 88.9 FM) in the lead-up to the Australian Bicentenary in 1988.

She was awarded a Master of Art Administration at the College of Fine Arts, University of New South Wales, Sydney in 1995.

== Academic work ==
From 2009 to 2011 Croft was senior lecturer of Indigenous art, design, and culture at the University of South Australia. From 2012 to 2015 Croft was a senior research fellow (Discovery Indigenous Award) with the National Institute for Experimental Art, UNSW Art & Design.

In 2018 she was appointed as Associate Professor, Indigenous Art History and Curatorship at the Australian National University.

== Curatorial and other work ==
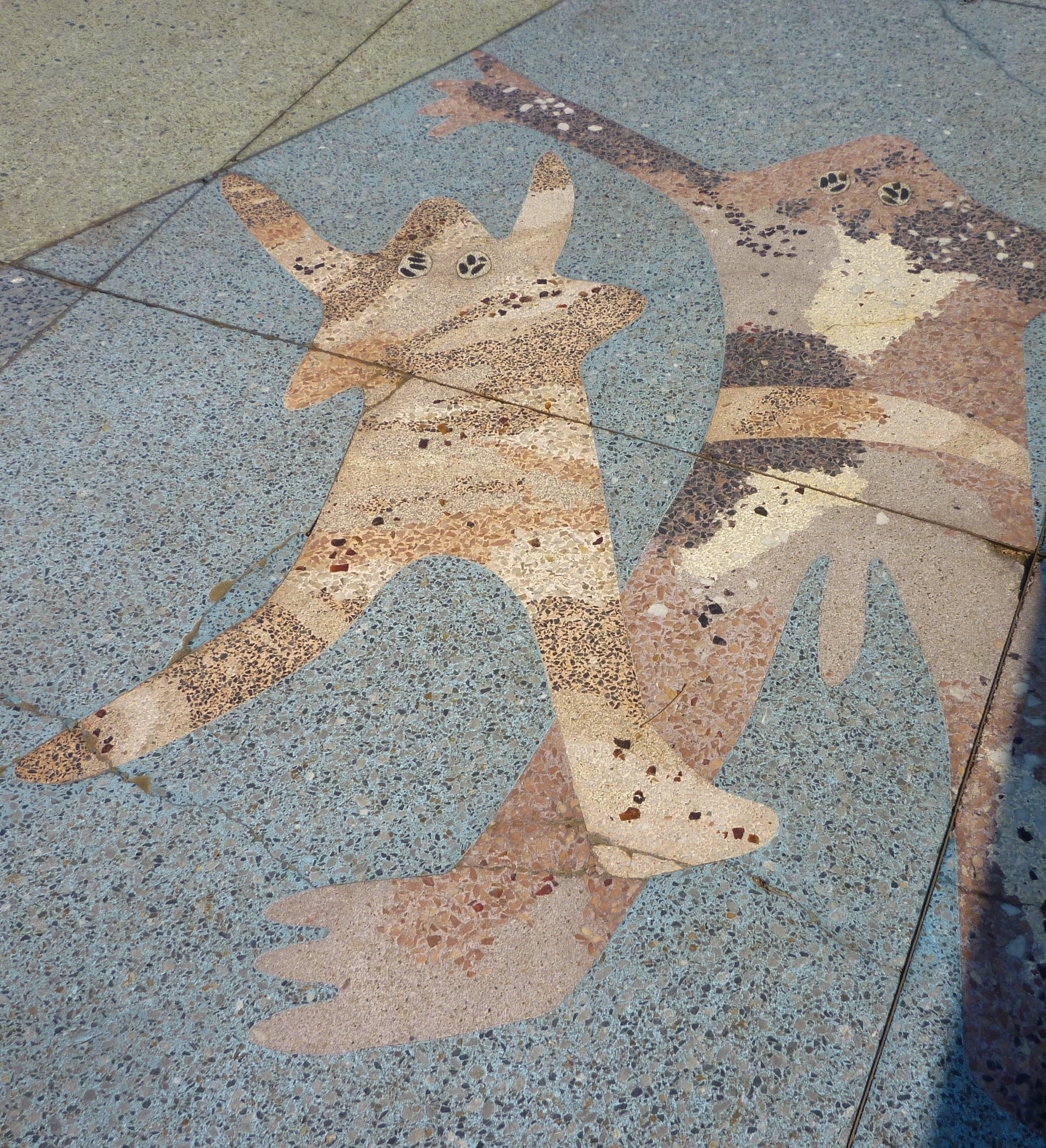
Croft's installation honouring the original Yura clans, titled Wuganmagulya (Farm Cove), Sydney, 2000

Croft was a founding member of the Boomalli Aboriginal Artists Cooperative in 1987.

Croft has worked as an arts administrator and curator at local, regional, state, federal and international levels since 1990. From 1999 to 2001 she was curator of Indigenous art at the Art Gallery of Western Australia; from 2002 to 2009 she was senior curator of Aboriginal and Torres Strait Islander art at the National Gallery of Australia.

Curatorial projects include Beyond the pale: Contemporary Indigenous Art, Adelaide Biennial of Australian Art for the 2000 Adelaide Festival of Arts; Culture Warriors (National Indigenous Art Triennial), National Gallery of Australia; Stop(the) Gap: International Indigenous art in Motion for the 2011 Adelaide International Film Festival; A Change is Gonna Come: 50th anniversary of the 1967 Referendum (Aboriginals) and 25th anniversary of the Mabo Decision, National Museum of Australia, 2017.

Her practice-led doctoral research project included the collaborative exhibition, Still in my Mind: Gurindji location, experience and visuality, UNSW Galleries, UQ Art Museum, 2017, touring nationally until late 2021. Solo exhibitions include Heart-in-hand, Canberra Contemporary Art Space, 2018; subalter/N/ative Dreams, Stills Gallery, Sydney; Peripheral Vision, Artplace, Perth (2005), Niagara Galleries, Melbourne (2006); Man about town, Stills Gallery, Sydney, (2003), Niagara Galleries, Melbourne (2004); fever (you give me), Stills Gallery, Sydney (2000); In my mother's garden, Gallery Gabrielle Pizzi, Melbourne (1998); In My Father's House, Australian Centre for Photography, Paddington, (1998).

Croft has also worked with Eastern Arrernte/Kalkadoon independent curator, arts administrator and writer, Hetti Perkins, on curatorial projects, including the Australian Indigenous Art Commission for the Musée du quai Branly, Paris, France, (2006); and the Australian exhibition at the 47th Venice Biennale in 1997, fluent: Emily Kame Kngwarreye, Yvonne Koolmatrie & Judy Watson, and was co-curated by Hetti Perkins, Croft and Victoria Lynn. It was commissioned by Michael Lynch.

In 2023, it was announced that Croft will serve as the Gough Whitlam and Malcolm Fraser Chair of Australian Studies at Harvard University in 2024, working with the Departments of History of Art and Architecture, and Art, Film, and Visual Studies.

== Awards and recognition ==
In 1996 Croft was the first Australian to receive the Chicago Artists International Program grant. She also was awarded the 1997 Australia Council for the Arts Greene Street Studio in New York; the 1998 Indigenous Arts Fellowship from the NSW Ministry for the Arts; an Alumni Award from UNSW in 2001; a 2015 Australia Council for the Arts National Indigenous Arts Award Fellowship; a Canberra Critics Circle Visual Arts Award for heart-in-hand in 2018; and the ANZ Best Indigenous Writing award for her practice-led doctoral research essay Still in my mind: Gurindji location, experience and visuality in 2018.

Croft was awarded an Honorary Doctorate (Visual Arts) from the University of Sydney in 2009.

Croft was named Visual Artist of the Year in the Deadly Awards 2013, which were the annual awards recognising Australian Aboriginal and Torres Strait Islander achievement. She won the Works on Paper Award at the 2023 National Aboriginal and Torres Strait Islander Art Awards.

In 2007, Croft was amongst 60 artists profiled in Sonia Payes' book Untitled. Portraits of Australian Artists.

In November 2026, Croft was elected a Fellow of the Australian Academy of the Humanities (FAHA).

== Artwork and exhibitions ==
Artwork by Croft has been exhibited in galleries throughout Australia, and overseas including Germany, Hungary, Japan, the Netherlands, South Africa, the United Kingdom and the USA. Her work has been collected by the National Gallery of Australia, the Art Gallery of New South Wales, the Art Gallery of West Australia, the National Gallery of Victoria and the National Portrait Gallery. Her sculptural work, Wuganmagulya (Farm Cove), was installed at the Royal Botanic Garden, Sydney, as part of the 2000 Sydney Sculpture Walk program.
