= Akeyulerre Healing Centre =

Australian Indigenous service in Alice Springs

The Akeyulerre Healing Centre, most often referred to as Akeyulerre, is a fee-for service health service developed by Arrernte Elders to acknowledge and promote the importance of Indigenous knowledge, practice and expertise in relation to all aspects of well being for the community. A core part of Akeyulerre's role is the preparation and creation of bush medicines (through their community enterprise Interrentye Body Products), working with ngangkari's, visits to country, song, dance and smoking ceremonies and the preparation of bush foods. They also involve young Arrernte people in these activities and pass on language and culture, including ecological knowledge. As a part of this they will often undertake trips to gather plants together which are used in tradition remedies.

The centre is based in Alice Springs, in the Northern Territory, and is located at the base of Billy Goat Hill (which the Arrernte name of is Akeyulerre and which is a sacred site to the Arrernte people) where they welcome all visitors; they also offer services in Ltyentye Apurte and Amoonguna (Imengkwerne).

== Background ==
Akeyulerre was established in 2000 by Arrernte Elders and community members and was created with the aim of strengthening their community and culture and address their communities serious health and social issues. Many Aboriginal people in Central Australia suffer from the diseases of the third world.

The three founders of the healing centre are:

- Kathy Abbott
- Jane Vadiveloo
- Myra Hayes

Akeyulerre is run by a committee of management, which incorporates a cultural governance system and a more Western system, to ensure the strength of their organisation. Akeyulerre and Children's Ground also work closely together as their approaches a consistent and they work together with many of the same Arrernte families.

== Publications ==
In 2021 Akeyulerre, in conjunction with Alice Springs based publisher Running Water Community Press (formerly Ptilotus Press) published the book: Arelhekenhe Angkentye: Women's Talk by Akeyulerre Healing Centre.

This book contains poems of lyapirtneme from Arrernte women around Central Australia; lyapirtneme s an Arrernte language word that means 'growing back' or 'returning'.
