= Mercia Butler =

Indigenous Australian Catholic nun (1933–1990)

Mercia Butler née Roberts (24 December 1933 – 29 September 1990) was an Alawa woman born at Ngukurr in the Northern Territory and she spent much of her early life at various missions and institutions around the region including the Channel Island Leprosarium. She is a member of the Stolen Generations.

Butler went on to become a Catholic nun and part of the Indigenous order ''Handmaids of Our Lord' which was formed and based in Papua New Guinea. She later became a health worker in the Northern Territory after she left the order.

== Biography ==
Butler was born at the Roper River Mission at, what is now known as, Ngukurr and was the youngest of five children born to Barnabas (also known as Gabarla) and Norah Roberts. Butler was originally named Mercy and it is unknown why her name was changed. Two of her brothers were Phillip Waipuldanya Roberts and Silas Ngulati Roberts.

When Butler was a baby her mother contracted leprosy and was admitted into the Channel Island Leprosarium and Butler went there with her. Butler remembers a happy childhood there and that watermelons thrived there and that the matron, Elsie Muriel Jones, grew beautiful flowers. Roberts was taken from the leprosarium in early 1940 when a Catholic mission boat arrived and removed all of the healthy children from there.

Butler was then taken to the Bathurst Island Mission where she was told her family at Ngukurr did not want her. She never saw her mother again and Norah, who left the leprosarium after the Bombing of Darwin died elsewhere shortly afterwards and the family were never able to find her grave.

In 1941 Butler was transferred again and sent to the newly established mission at Garden Point (Pirlangimpi) which had been established for 'mixed race' children; this was despite the fact that both of Butler's parents were Alawa people. Soon after arrival and on 18 February 1942 Butler was evacuated to Darwin, alongside all of the other girls there, due to the increased risk of bombing. This meant that Butler, and the other girls, were in Darwin for the initial drop of bombs there when they were playing in the schoolyard. The children recalled seeing planes 'dropping eggs' until American soldiers took them to hide under the school and covered them in mattresses; none of them were injured.

The following day they were transferred to Adelaide, first to Adelaide River by truck, while they waitied for a train the rest of their journey. Butler later recalled the shortage of food there and how, for the first time, they readily ate all their bread crusts. She then spent the duration of the war and lived on a farm in Carrieton. and after the war she was returned to Pirlangimpi.

As they were some of the few role models she knew Butler decided to become a nun and, in 1956, she was sent to Port Moresby where she joined the Indigenous order, which had been formed there, the 'Handmaids of Our Lord'. While there she undertook a three-year maternal and child course and spent the next few years at isolation mission centres throughout the mountains. There she acted as a midwife and taught mothers how to better feed their children.

After 12 years in Papua New Guinea Butler decided to return home and, in 1968, visited Darwin and was able to meet with her father and brothers. A few months later Butler left the order and worked at the Darwin Hospital, her qualifications gained overseas were not recognised and it was not possible for her to qualify as a nurse at that time as her existing qualification did not qualify her to be able to enroll. This was despite her being reassured she could do so before leaving the order. In 1969, while employed by the hospital, Butler was sent to Daly River, alongside a nurse, to assist in the care of quadruplets that had been born to Mabel Mein-Bel at the hospital and then sent home to their community. This multiple birth garnered national attention in the media.

Some time later Butler visited her mothers family at Ngukurr and there married an Alawa man Herbert Butler who was a linesman based in Alice Springs. They moved together there were Butler had one child, a son called Richard. There Butler was able to undertake training as an enrolled nurse, nurses aid, and worked at the Alice Springs Hospital for a time before transferring to work in community health to be able to work more closely with Aboriginal and Torres Strait Islander patients.

When Butler became unwell she was sent to Adelaide for treatment, accompanied by her husband, and died there on 29 September 1990.
