= Elsie Muriel Jones =

Australian nurse and matron (1886–1942)

- Born: 11 November 1886; Bairnsdale
- Died: 17 May 1942 (aged 55); Brisbane
- Occupation: Nurse

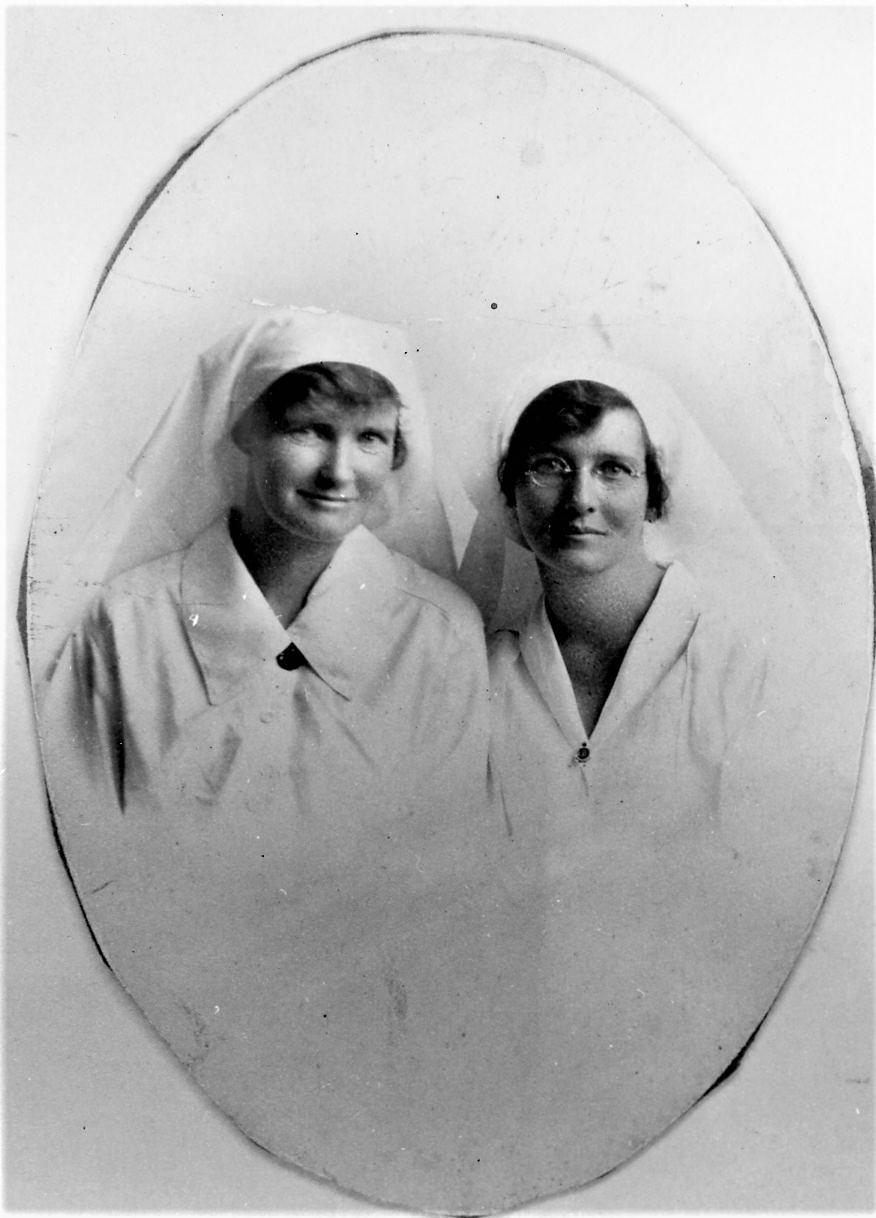
Sister Gray and Sister King (later Jones) at Wimmera, Victoria River Downs, 1924

Elsie Muriel Jones née King MBE (11 November 1886 – 17 May 1942) was a nursing sister for the Australian Army Nursing Service during World War I and later for the Australian Inland Mission in the Northern Territory.

She was also the matron in charge of Pine Creek Home (1933–1934), The Bungalow (1934–1936) and the Channel Island Leprosarium (1937–1942).

== Early life ==
Jones was born in Bairnsdale in Victoria and was the daughter of Leonard William, who worked as a shipping agent, and Sophie. Jones trained as a nurse and qualified from Sale District Hospital on 4 March 1916 and subsequently joined the Australian Army Nursing Service from which she was sent to Salonika and Egypt between 1916 and 1919. During this period she was known as 'Sister King'.

After the end of the war she returned to Victoria where she trained as a midwife and registered that qualification on 2 December 1921.

== Life in the Northern Territory ==
After completing her midwifery qualifications Jones joined the Australian Inland Mission, under the leadership of John Flynn, and it was originally planned that she would be serving at Maranboy Hospital, near Barunga, where there was an outbreak of malaria. However, following her arrival in Darwin in mid-April 1922, it was identified that the people at Victoria River Downs Station were in greater need and she was sent there. At the station she nursed people on the verandah of the homestead (where she lived) and would also make frequent trips to more remote parts of the region to care for the people there and to other stations to deliver babies. At one point she spent six weeks caring for a policeman who had broken his leg in a remote location and was not able to be moved. She was later joined by Sister Jean Gray and Jones said of this time:

I nursed the men in a hut, I tended the sick who camped on the bank of the river and visited others up to 100 miles away...when my mate Sister Gray arrived it was a great day to me. In the 200 miles, she had travelled part of the way in a car and horseback and finished up in a buckboard the last 110 miles through heavy rains

— Elsie Muriel Jones, via the NT Heritage Register

The need at Victoria River Downs was large so in 1923 construction began on 'Wimmera House' (also known as Wimmera Nursing Home and Wimmera Hospital). At the station Jones met and married stockman Robert John (Jack) Jones who had served as a signaller during the war. The couple had two children together, Jack and Barbara, and Jones continued to work as a nurse while raising her children.

In 1933 they left the Victoria River Downs region and settled in Pine Creek where Jones became the matron at Pine Creek Home and, during this period, Jones also provided medical care, on a voluntary basis, to many members of the community until the hospital was re-opened in early 1934. Upon re-opening she was appointed as the nursing sister.

Despite the hospital reopening Jones and her husband decided to travel with the children, all boys, when they were transferred to The Bungalow in Alice Springs where they were in charge. In this role they had responsibility for 140 children and Jones was responsible for all the medical care of the children; this included epidemics of measles and whooping cough. The couple left the Bungalow at the end of 1936 when they needed to travel to Victoria for many months to allow their children to be treated for trachoma.

In 1937 Jones accepted a position at the Channel Island Leprosarium, where her husband would also work, and part of the motivation for doing so was that trachoma was less severe in this region. Jones' children lived in Darwin while she worked here as they were not permitted to live on the island. In this role she was greatly respected and loved by many of the patients and former residents, such as Mercia Butler, had fond memories of her there; including of the flowers she grew. It was while working here she was honoured with the Member of the Order of the British Empire (MBE) in 1938 for services to nursing.

Jones remained at the Leprosarium during the build up of war in Darwin, despite the evacuation of her children and many other civilians in the region. Feeling unwell she was admitted to Darwin Hospital as a patient on the morning of 19 February 1942, the day of the first bombing of Darwin and the next day was able to return to the island to organise the evacuation of many of the patients to the mainland. She left Darwin by train on 24 February 1942 to Tennant Creek where she stayed on a nearby cattle station Rockhampton Downs.

Here, on 10 March 1942, she became very unwell and the Royal Flying Doctor Service where unable to assist immediately so a doctor from Tennant Creek Walter Straede, and his wife, went to assist. Their car broke down and they died on this journey. She was later able to be flown to Brisbane where she died on 17 May 1942 at the age of 54.
