= Phillip Waipuldanya Roberts =

Australian traditional doctor (1922–1988)

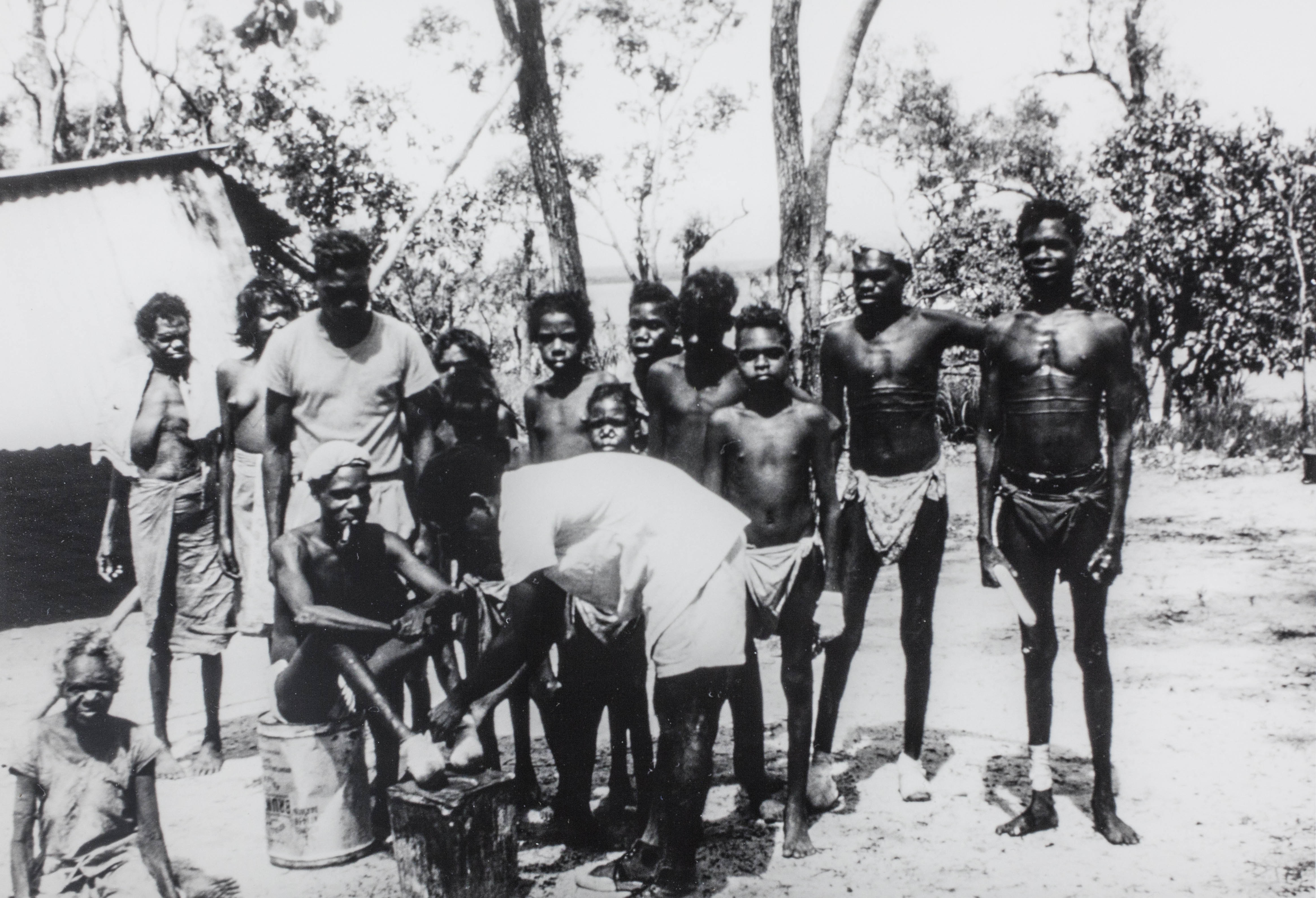
- Phillip Roberts dressing leprosy patients wounds in Maningrida

Personal details
- Born: Phillip Waipuldanya Roberts; 1922 Roper River, Australia
- Died: 24 November 1988 (aged 65–66)
- Occupation: Doctor, activist

Phillip Waipuldanya Roberts OBE (1922 – 24 November 1988) was a traditional doctor, activist and adviser to the Commonwealth Government of Australia on Aboriginal policies and programs.

== Early life ==
Roberts was born south of the Roper River in the country of the Alawa people. He was the eldest son of Barnabas Gabarla, a former drover, stockman and saddler who became an evangelist for Roper River Mission. He is the brother of Mercia Butler and Silas Ngulati Roberts.

Roberts received a primary school education from the mission and became a motor mechanic.

== Working life ==
In 1953, he went to Urapunga Station to repair a marine engine and met Dr WA (Spike) Langsford of the Department of Health accompanying him on a survey of the Victoria River District. He then worked as a medical assistant for the department and became well known for seeking out Aboriginal people in remote areas with leprosy, encouraging them to come to Darwin for treatment. It earned him the title of 'Leper Hunter'. Queen Elizabeth II visited Roberts on her 1963 visit to Darwin.

In 1969 he was selected as one of only three advisers for the Council of Aboriginal Affairs established after the 1967 Referendum. He advised the Commonwealth Government of Australia on Aboriginal policies and programs.

The book I, the Aboriginal by Douglas Lockwood is written about Roberts. It won the major literary award at the Adelaide Festival of the Arts in 1962. It was developed into an hour-long film in 1964.
