= Hetty Perkins =

Australian Aboriginal elder (c. 1895–1979)

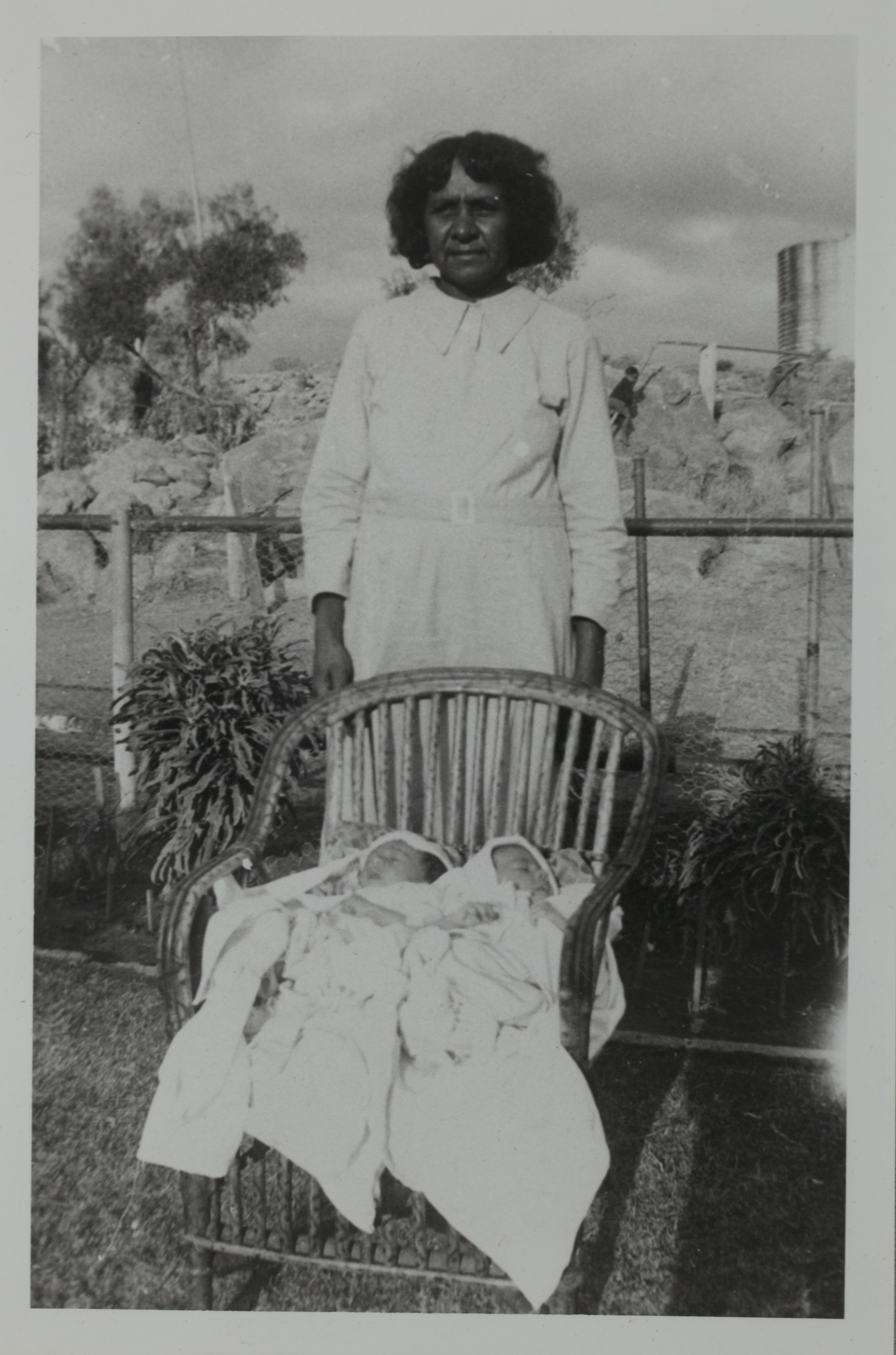
Hetty Perkins in 1938

Hetty Perkins (c. 1895 (Note: Various sources give her year of birth between 1895 and 1905, ADB, the most reliable source states 1895) – 8 December 1979) was an elder of the Eastern Arrernte people, an Aboriginal group from Central Australia. Several of her descendants have had prominent careers in various fields, both in the Northern Territory and in other states and territories.

== Biography ==
Born in Arltunga, the "first substantial European settlement in Central Australia", Perkins was the daughter of Burke Perkins (known as Harry), a white miner originally from Broken Hill, New South Wales, and his wife, Nellie Errerreke, an Arrernte woman. Her father was employed on the Central Australia Railway, working on the construction of the line between Alice Springs and Oodnadatta. Perkins was raised in Arltunga, and began working at the hotel there at the age of 14, as a domestic servant. She later moved to "The Garden", a pastoral lease north-west of Arltunga, where the manager was James (Jim) Turner. In 1913, she had a child with Robert Harold (Harry) Lake, a white man who was the General Storekeeper, named Percy Perkins, later named Lake. Percy was a truck driver and is the namesake of the Percy Lake Truck Parking Bay.

In Hetty's time in Arltunga, Hetty and Jim Turner went on to have several children together, with Perkins already having one child born during her time at Arltunga. However, in 1927, Jim Turner married a white woman from Brisbane, Gertie Elliott, with whom he would have another five children. Turner subsequently offered Perkins part of the property, but she refused, and instead in 1928 left to work at The Bungalow at Jay Creek settlement, as a dormitory supervisor and cook.

The Bungalow was transferred to the Alice Springs townsite in 1932 on the site of the Alice Springs Telegraph Station. Perkins relocated as well, and in Alice Springs met Martin Connelly, a labourer from Mount Isa, Queensland, born to an Irish father and a Kalkadoon mother. The couple had two children together, with Perkins being the mother to eleven children in total. Many of these children were sent to Adelaide to be educated at Anglican institutions, and their mother was reportedly "ambivalent" to traditional life. However, she remained a fluent speaker of the Eastern Arrernte language, and passed on the Arrernte dreaming to her children.

From her work at The Bungalow, Perkins is remembered as a "strict but hard worker who did her best to provide the children with the best upbringing that she could".

Perkins died in Alice Springs on 8 December 1979.

== Legacy ==
The Hetti Perkins Home for the Aged which caters for older Indigenous people, providing residential care particularly to those suffering from disabilities and chronic health problems, is named after her.

Perkins' most notable child was Charlie Perkins, who played soccer at high levels and later became known for his work as an advocate of Indigenous rights.

Two of Charlie Perkins' children, Rachel and Hetti Perkins, went on to be prominent in arts circles (as a screenwriter and art curator, respectively), while two more of Hetty Perkins' grandchildren were also noteworthy – Patricia Turner was a CEO of the Aboriginal and Torres Strait Islander Commission (ATSIC) and Neville Perkins was a member of parliament in the Northern Territory. In May 2011, as part of a redistribution of Northern Territory Legislative Assembly seats, it was proposed that the seat of Araluen be renamed the seat of Perkins, in her honour. However, the proposal was later abandoned after local opposition.

Her great-granddaughter is actress Madeleine Madden.
