= Robert Stott =

Australian police commissioner (1858–1928)

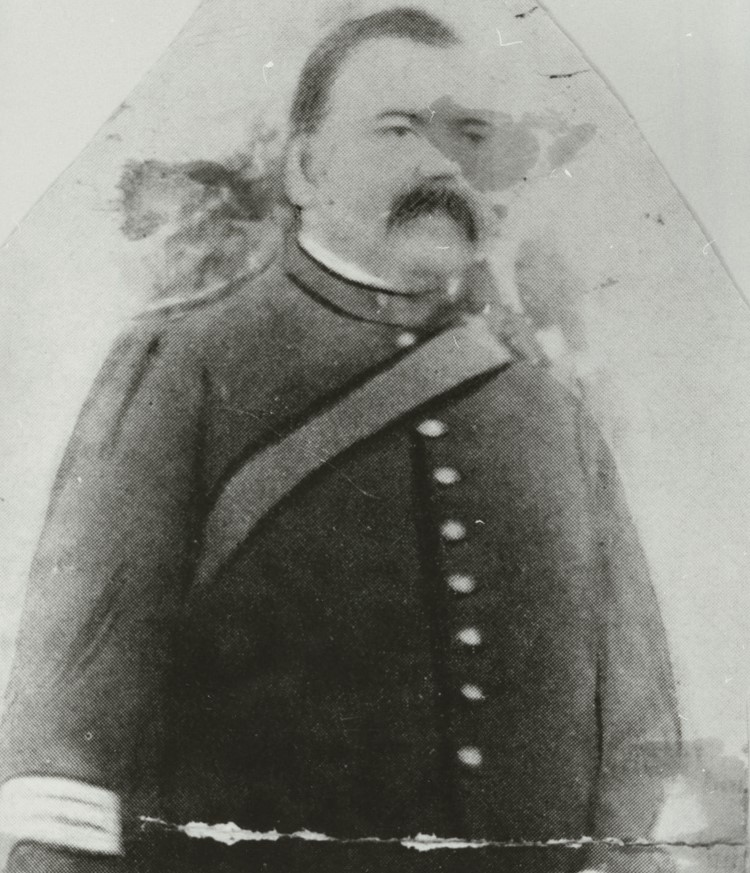
- Sergeant Robert Stott, c. 1900
- Born: July 13, 1858
- Died: April 21, 1928 (aged 69)
- Occupation: Police officer
- Years active: 1882–1927
- Known for: Work in the Northern Territory Police Force

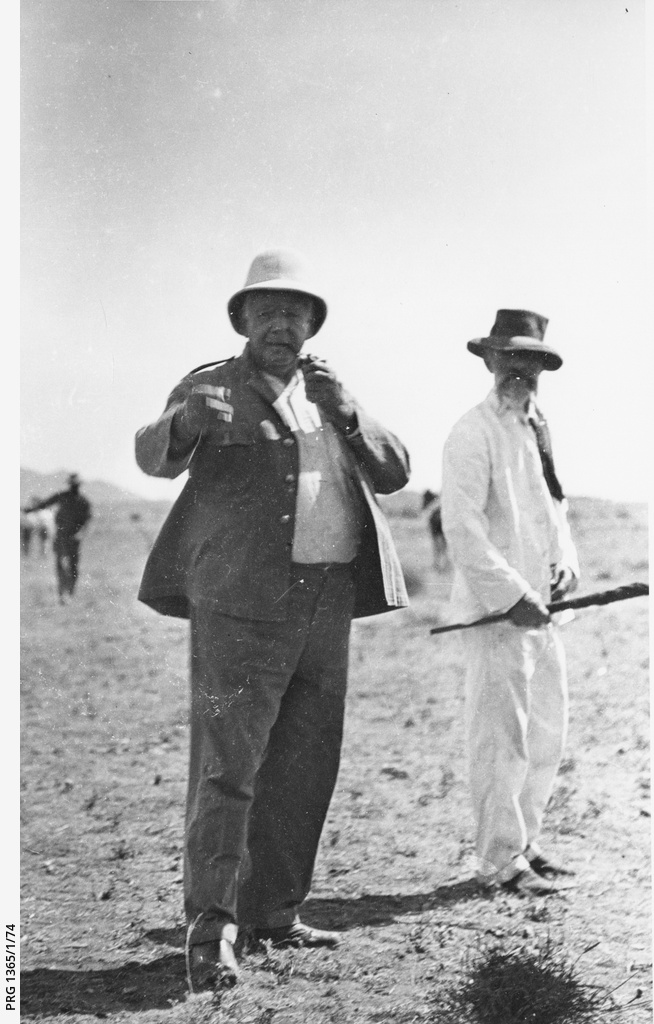
Robert Stott in 1922

Robert Stott (13 July 1858 – 21 April 1928) was a constable and later police commissioner in the Northern Territory of Australia.

== Early life ==
Robert Stott was born in the blacksmith's croft at Nigg in Kincardineshire, Scotland, the son of James Stott, a fishery overseer and his wife Catherine. Not much is known of his early life but it is believed that he was well educated and, before migrating to Australia, served in the Lancashire constabulary.

Stott migrated, with three friends, to Australia in 1882.

== Career ==
On arrival in the colony of South Australia in 1882, Stott joined the South Australian Police Force as a foot constable. transferring to the Northern Territory Police Force in 1883.

In the Northern Territory Police Force Stott first became a mounted constable, 3rd class, who often went on long patrols. For a decade he was posted at Burrundie, Roper River, with some time spent at the Victoria River. As a mounted constable Stott travelled widely, by either horse or camel, and completed regular six-to-eight week patrols of the region as well as additional special missions to investigate serious incidents. In these patrols, he was often assisted by Aboriginal trackers or native police.

From 1908 Stott was a mounted constable, 1st class, at Borroloola, until in 1911 he was transferred to Alice Springs (then called Stuart) as the sergeant in charge. Upon arrival Stott and his family moved into the stone police house nearby the Stuart Town Gaol, and his roles included being the keeper of the gaol, mining warden, administrator of the affairs of the Lands Department, and being a stock inspector.

Significantly, he took on the responsibilities of Sub-Protector of Aborigines; a role previously exercised by the telegraph stationmasters at the Alice Springs Telegraph Station. The stationmaster of the day, John McKay, was happy to relinquish the role that had caused him a lot of pain. As sub-protector Stott enforced the rule that "half-caste" children be given their fathers', often well-known, surnames. It was said that Stott took a paternal interest in these children. In 1913–14, was instrumental in setting up the school and hostel for "half-caste" Aboriginal children known as The Bungalow.

Stott was reportedly firm, yet humane, in his role, and he was praised for respecting Aboriginal customs and beliefs. He also, in a rare move for the times, learned to speak Arrernte, the local language. According to Dick Kimber, Stott was respected wherever he went and "ruled with only a riding crop and the force of his remarkable character".

In December 1917 major charges were laid against Stott for wrongdoing by a former police officer that served under him, Mounted Constable CE Kelly who had arrived to work under Stott on 20 March 1917 and gave up his post on 1 August 1917. Kelly made a series of allegations against Stott, including that he was a bully, that he misused government resources and accepted bribes. It was also alleged that he ill-treated Aboriginal people and people at The Bungalow and that his policies about The Bungalow in general were wrong.

Judge David Bevan was sent down from Darwin to conduct the hearing about these allegations and interviewed many of the residents of the district and these witnesses included Ida Standley and Carl Strehlow. It was ultimately found that:

After hearing the evidence of the various witnesses and inspecting the files, documents and records I am of opinion that the charges as a whole are without foundation, and that Sergeant Stott is completely exonerated.

— Judge Bevan, Report of Inquiry into charges made by ex-MC Kelly against Sergeant Stott of Alice Springs, 6 February 1918

In 1924 Victorian governor, the Earl of Stradbroke, visited Alice Springs and, addressing local children, he asked if they could name their king and they responded "Sergeant Stott".

By the late 1920s Stott had become a legendary figure and was known for careering around in one of the earliest motor cars in the region, and known to enjoy a good whiskey.

In 1927 he rose to the position of Commissioner of Central Australian Police, when the Territory was divided in two with the central region forming Central Australia (territory).

== Later life and death ==
The arrival of John Cawood, who was appointed in the new position of Government Resident of Central Australia, in 1926 brought an end to Stott's position in the town and, no longer having the responsibilities he once did, he retired to Adelaide, South Australia, in April 1928.

Stott was killed on 5 May 1929 when he was hit by the Glenelg train at a level crossing in Wayville. He was reportedly deaf and did not hear the train whistle, and was unused to trains as there were none in Alice Springs at the time. His Aboriginal domestic servant, Maggie Plenty, said that the family were planning to move to Perth.

Many, including Stuart Traynor, believe that, if Stott had not retired, the 1928 Coniston Massacre would not have happened as, with his experience, he would have taken a more cautious and restrained approach than the inexperienced George Murray.

== Personal life ==
On 27 November 1899 Stott married English-born Mary Duggan, who died giving birth to their first child on 11 February 1901. Their daughter, Lily Duggan, died a few weeks later on 3 March.

Stott married again on the 21 April 1902 to Agnes Heaslop, and they went on to have six children: Malcolm, Cameron, Robert (known by his second name Cameron), Agnes, Malvern and Mavis.
