= Shirley Brown (author) =

Australian author

Shirley Naomi Brown (née Probert) is an Australian author who has written extensively about the history of Alice Springs in the Northern Territory of Australia.

== Early life ==
Brown grew up in Burwood in Melbourne, Victoria. She wanted to be a dressmaker, but at aged 16 she contracted polio, which affected her right hand, and meant that she had to find other work. She taught herself to type and got a job as a receptionist for a medical specialist in Collins Street, Melbourne. She went on to work in office positions in advertising agencies and television in both Melbourne and Sydney in office positions.

After an eight-month touring holiday in South Africa, she returned to Sydney, where she met her future husband George Brown, a commercial artist, in 1959. George had visited Alice Springs in 1950, and in 1952 he set up an art centre business along with three friends selling their handcrafted items.

== Life in the Northern Territory ==
Brown arrived in Alice Springs in 1961, here she worked as a volunteer for Red Cross and in the Alice Springs Hospital in many capacities. Following Cyclone Tracy, she was vice president of Red Cross, and she helped care for evacuees.

She and George were married in Sydney in 1963, and returned to Alice Springs. They bought their first house in 1966 and were involved in several businesses together, including The Little Shop around 1979.

In April 1987 Brown enrolled in a creative writing course at TAFE in Alice Springs and so began her writing career. She wrote about Alice Springs and Central Australians and has had several books published. She was also a potter and had an interest in making pottery cats which she showed in two exhibitions of her work.

== Recognition ==
In 1999, she won a National Trust NT Award for significant contribution to the understanding of the history of Alice Springs and Centralians. She was recognised for her contribution to the Northern Territory community winning a ‘Tribute to Northern Territory Women’ award in 2009.

Brown was included in as part of Twenty Women: a Photographic Exhibition for International Day of People With Disabilities, sponsored by Office of Multicultural Affairs.

== Publications ==
- 1988 - Short historical pieces published in Colours of This Land, a Bicentennial Anthology published by the Darwin Chapter of the Fellowship of Australian Writers. Other works followed in Scribes in the centre, Scribes in the Centre 2 and Once Upon a Rock
- 1991 - My Alice: a personal history of Alice Springs
- 1993 - Alice Springs past and present with illustrations by George Scott Brown.
- 1993 - NT Dictionary of Biography Vol 3. Shirley Brown wrote three articles: Hazel Golder Sr Eileen Heath and Bill Waudby.
- 1998 - Chatting with Centralians: a recorded history of thirty Centralians
- 2002 - Legends of the Red Heart
- 2003 - Alec: A living history of the Alice Springs Telegraph Station
- 2006 - Icons of the Territory
