= Pine Creek Home =

Stolen Generations institution in Australia (1931–1942)

Pine Creek Home also known as Pine Creek Boys Home was a government run home in Pine Creek in the Northern Territory which operated from 1931 to 1933 which perpetrated the Stolen Generations. The home was initially established to reduce overcrowding at the Myilly Point Home, just outside the Kahlin Compound, in Darwin. During this period it housed only boys and, when the home closed, they were primarily moved to The Bungalow in Alice Springs.

The home briefly reopened, for a few months, in late 1940 as a place for Aboriginal children who were being transferred from government institutions to various missions. It was also used in 1942 as temporary accommodation for people that were being evacuated from the region following the Bombing of Darwin.

== History ==
The first children arrived at the Pine Creek Home in September 1931 when 28 boys, between the ages of 4 and 14 were moved there from the Myilly Point Home. Each of these boys had previously been removed from their families from across of the Northern Territory. Five boys that were sent to the home were later transferred to Bathurst Island or Oenpelli Missions because of the 'predominance of Aboriginal blood’.

In 1933 the matron in charge of the home was Elsie Muriel Jones who, as a nurse, was also responsible for the medical care of the children and, when they were transferred to The Bungalow she went with them and became matron in charge.

One of the children moved there was Alec Kruger and he described it as being 'pleasant and harmonious' compared to life at Myilly point and that, while he attended the local school he was a restless student but found the teachers lenient and that he was often allowed to leave class and do activities outside. The attendance of the boys at the local school did cause conflict within the community with some parents refusing to send their children as the boys from the home "were unfit to associate with white children". This controversy, which resulted in the prosecution of a number of the parents, was reported nationally.

The home opened again in 1940 to house children that were displaced when the Australian Army took over the Bagot Aboriginal Reserve (now the Bagot Community). This was part of a move to transfer many children from the 'care' of the Department of Native Affairs to church missions throughout the Northern Territory. There were 70 children living there when it was damaged by a cyclone in November 1940; there were no casualties.

In 1942, it was used again to house people being evacuated following the Bombing of Darwin, this included a number of students from St Joseph's School, Darwin, when they were being evacuated to South Australia.

The former home is a part of the National Redress Scheme.

== Notable former residents ==
- Alec Kruger
- Joseph (Joe) Croft
