= Alec Kruger =

Australian Indigenous litigant (1924–2015)

Alec (Bumbolili) Kruger (24 December 1924 – 20 February 2015 ) was a member of the Stolen Generations and one of the plaintiffs who unsuccessfully sought compensation from the government in Kruger v Commonwealth in the High Court of Australia.

== Early life ==
Kruger was born on the banks of the Katherine River at a place called Donkey Camp, the son of Franz (Frank) Kruger and Yrambul Nungarai a Mudburra woman, Kruger is one of their two children and the couple stayed together until Frank's death in 1938.

No specific records were kept but it appears that Kruger was taken from his family in mid-1928, alongside his sister Gladys, as a toddler and they were placed in the Kahlin Compound in Darwin. For Yrambul this is not the first time she had had children taken away from her and, despite knowing it was useless, she still followed the children to Darwin and stood outside the gates every day until, finally, she had to return home and to her remaining children (who were not take away as their father was Mudburra). In addition to Gladys, Kruger already had two sisters a Kahlin; Ada and Alice.

When Kruger was six, in September 1931, he was moved to Pine Creek Home, in Pine Creek, along with 27 other boys and, from all accounts, it was a much better place then Kahlin. However, he was separated from his sisters and would not see them again until the end of World War II.

Kruger was moved again in 1933, to The Bungalow in Alice Springs, with 33 of the boys from the Pine Creek Home when it closed; he was now even further away from his family.

Kruger said of The Bungalow in his book Alone on the Soaks:

Anyone going out to see the Telegraph Station these days is not going to get much of a picture of what the place looked like when I first saw it. They've ripped down all the thrown-together tin dormitories and the other shacks and sheds that were everywhere. There are lawns where there used to be just bulldust and rubbish. As it's presented today you might think it was a really nice place. Why are all of us complaining? Well in my time, it wasn't very nice at all. It might have worked as a telegraph station and home for a dozen people, but with 140 kids living there at its peak, it was an overcrowded prison.

At The Bungalow classes were very large and Alec spent most of the time outside for misbehaving and he was still illiterate when he left at the age of 10.

Kruger left The Bungalow at the age of 10, in 1935, when he was selected, out of a line-up by the Bloomfield's from Loves Creek Station. Kruger says that most slaves got it better than he did at there and that, despite many promises, no wages were ever paid to him.

== Working life ==
When, after a conversation, with Gordon Sweeney, patrol officer, Kruger discovered that he had not being paid, and had little chance of being so despite the Bloomfield's being obliged to, he ran away and enlisted in the army. He believed that, in the army, he would get to fight for his country and earn good money (equal pay).

Kruger was 17 but he told the recruiters that he was 18 and he was placed in the Aboriginal Unit and mostly worked loading trucks. Kruger did not serve overseas but worked throughout the Northern Territory, including Darwin Harbour.

Following the war, he reconnected with his family and spent two years living with them in Katherine; during this time his mother reprimanded him for joining the army, calling them "murderers and cowards". He defended his choice.

In the early 1950s he held a number of roles on cattle stations including Wave Hill, Wernaginga, Creswell Downs and Alcoota. While at Wernaginga Station Norman Pendergest, known as 'Splinter', would teach Kruger to read and it as on that basis that Kruger, who valued education, would accept lower wages.

Kruger also accepted other work and travelled significantly including throughout Queensland, in the 1950s he attempted to reenlist in the army but was turned away because he was unable to provide any proof of identity or age, He felt humiliated by this.

By 1953, finding it harder to find work, Kruger settled in the Gap Settlement in Alice Springs where he worked on the railroads with the Department of Works. He retired at 65 in 1989.

== High Court ==
In 1997 Kruger went to the High Court to testify that mixed-race children were systematically removed from their parents in the Northern Territory and this case, Kruger v Commonwealth, which became known as the Stolen Generation Case. In this case, the High Court rejected a challenge to the validity of legislation applying to the Northern Territory, namely the Aboriginals Ordinance 1918, between 1918–1957.

In the wake of this decision the Stolen Generation Association was established in Alice Springs and Kruger was a part of the management committee.

== Death ==
Kruger died 20 February 2015.
