= The Bungalow =

Former Australian institution for Aboriginal children

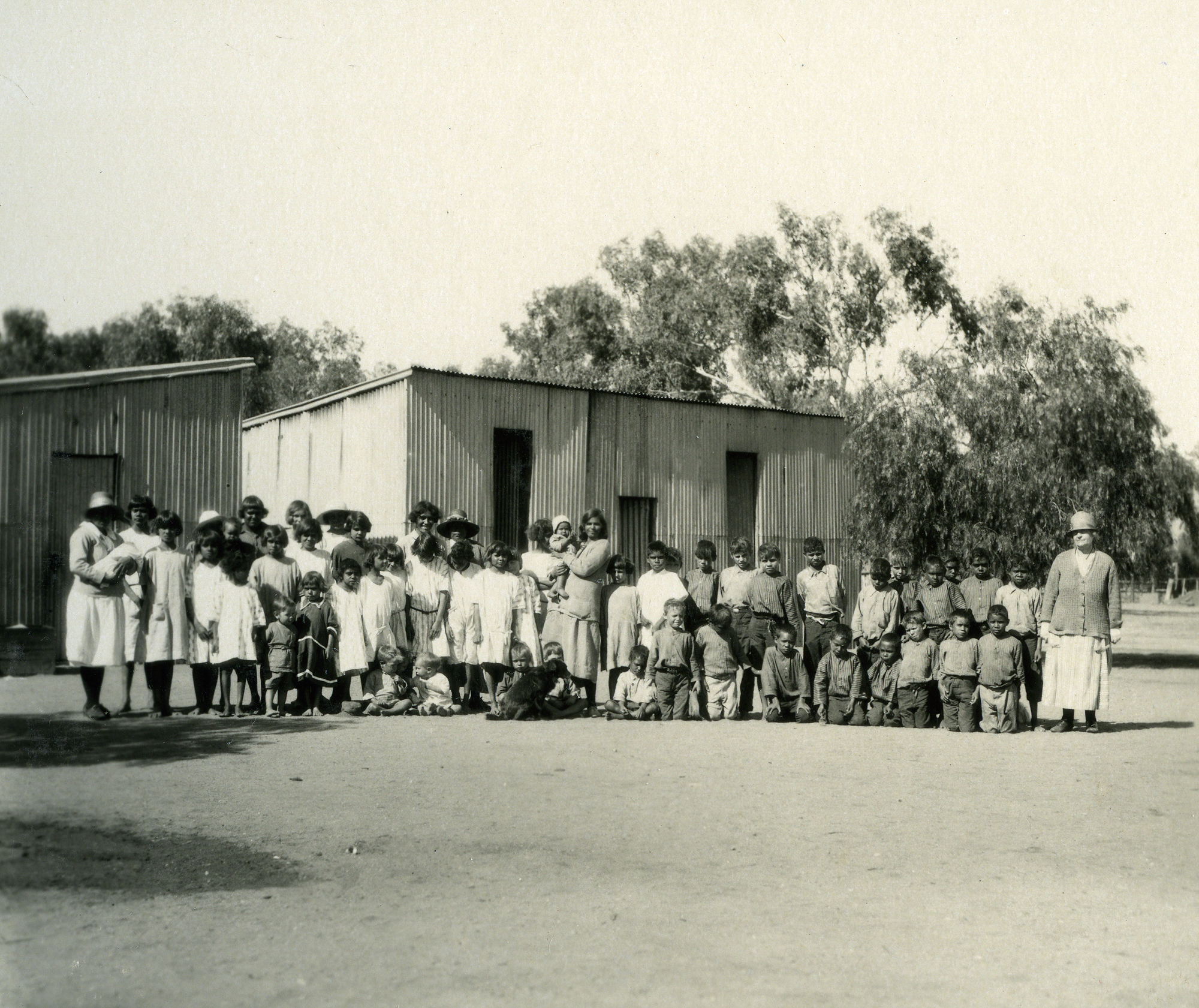
Aboriginal children at the Bungalow in Alice Springs, 1927

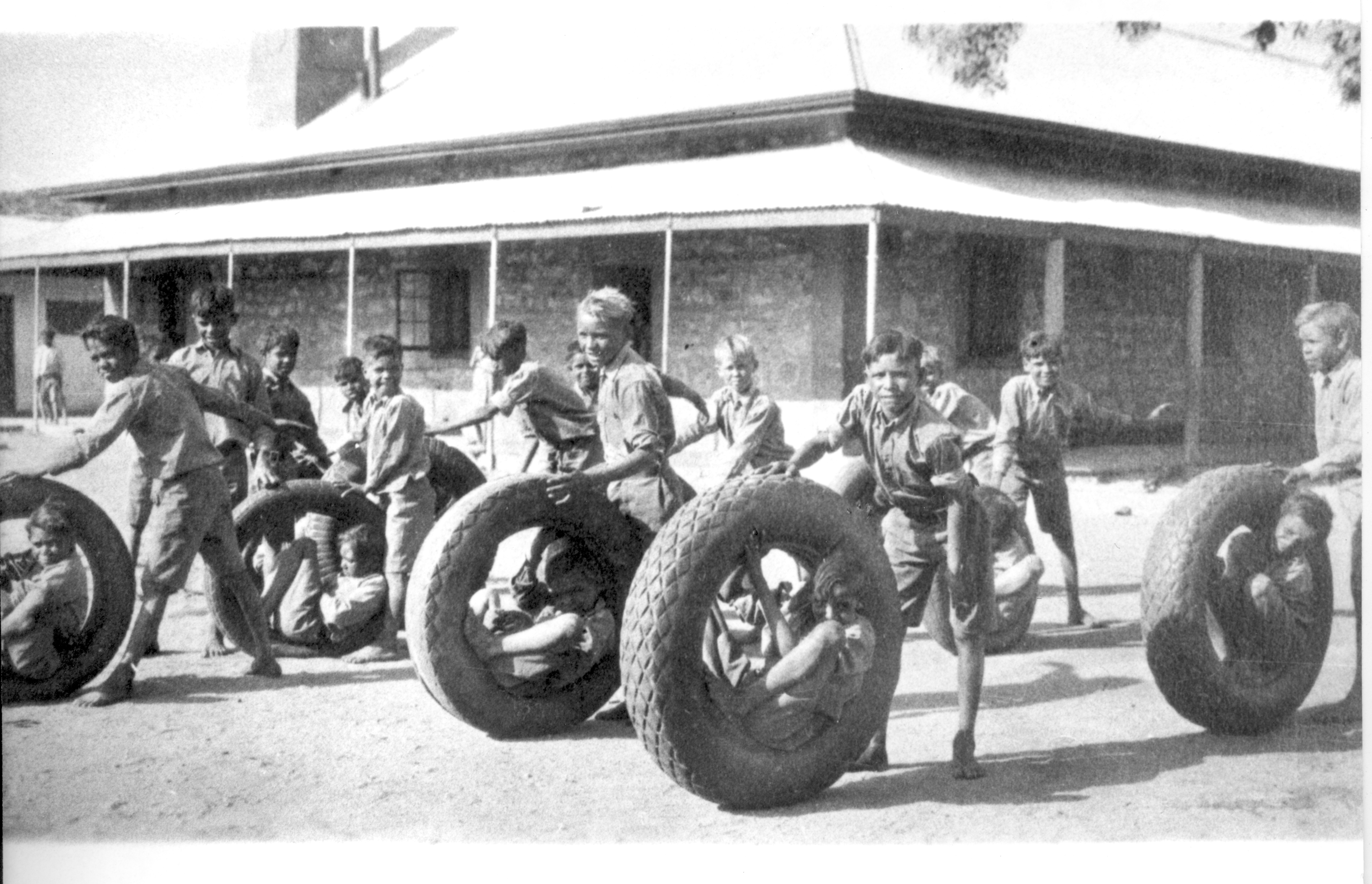
Tire games at The Bungalow when at the Alice Springs Telegraph Station, 1935

The Bungalow was an institution for Aboriginal children established in 1914 in Alice Springs in the Northern Territory of Australia. It existed at several locations in Alice Springs (then called Stuart), Jay Creek and the Alice Springs Telegraph Station.

The children that were housed here were part of the Stolen Generations.

== Background ==
From 1911 the Commonwealth Government gained control of the Northern Territory from South Australia. It then came under the jurisdiction of the Department of External Affairs. In July 1913, Senior Constable Robert Stott in Stuart (now Alice Springs) wrote to the Secretary of the Department of External Affairs Atlee Hunt describing the need for a government school in the town. In January 1914, the Administrator of the Northern Territory, John A. Gilruth, visited Stuart. He also stated his belief that the government should provide a school, noting that "there would be eleven school-age white children, four quadroons and some half caste children" who should receive some sort of education. He proposed the erection of a teacher's residence with classroom attached.

In March 1914, Stott telegraphed Gilruth advising that a building where he kept rations for Aboriginal people could be converted temporarily into a classroom. On the same day Gilruth advised that arrangements were being made with the South Australian Director of Education to procure a teacher. The first teacher was Ida Standley, who departed for Stuart from Adelaide, South Australia, on 6 May 1914. Her salary was £150 per annum. The school opened in June with 25 students. Standley taught the white children for four-and-a-half hours each morning at the police station. After lunch, 14 "half-caste" children joined her class for one-and-a-half hours. Standley sometimes provided evening classes to "half-caste" adults at The Bungalow.

Overnight these "half-caste" children were cared for by Topsy Smith, an Arabana woman who had recently arrived in Stuart, following the death of her husband Bill Smith, a miner working in Arltunga. Smith and seven of her eleven "half-caste" children, were given a tent by Stott, who informed the Administrator that there was no other accommodation for her family. He suggested that two township allotments near the Police Station, and behind the Stuart Arms Hotel, should be reserved for the use "half-castes". The Administrator agreed to this, and authorised the building of an iron shed and Topsy Smith was placed in charge of it under the supervision of Sergeant Stott and, by November 1914, she was caring for 16 children. This number continued to grow rapidly with light-skinned children being picked up from Aboriginal camps and placed there. Also in 1914, Standley agreed to accept the position of matron with an extra remuneration of £50 per annum, and they began working together.

This became known as The Bungalow although it is unclear who came up with that name or exactly when and, although it conjures up a homely image, the place "soon degenerated to a wretched hovel". Living conditions behind the Stuart Arms Hotel were far from ideal and, despite the great effort of both Topsy Smith and Ida Standley, to keep the place clean and the children clothed. Food was limited and the children would often hang around the Stuart Arms Hotel looking for scraps. Milton Liddle (son of William Liddle) recalled that:

...we'd hang around the Stuart Arms Hotel looking for scraps. When the waitresses and cooks used to bring it out to the chooks, they'd give it to us because they knew we were starving in the institution and when we couldn't get anything to eat there, we'd go hunting all over the hills - or to Anzac Hill - there was miles of rabbits and goannas, and all sorts of things in them days - and berries - we'd go round scrounging everywhere

— Milton Liddle via Tony Austin, I can picture the old home so clearly: the Commonwealth and 'half-caste' youth in the Northern Territory, 1911-1939

Aboriginal women from around the region, possibly looking for their children, would also drop off food when they could. This food mostly came from their own rations and johnnycakes they had made especially; they also dropped off traditional bush foods.

Additionally toilet and washing facilities were primitive and there were few proper beds, with the residents huddling together on the floor in winter and camping outdoors, and under the trees, in summer.

The Bungalow remained in the hotel's "backyard" until 1928 when they were moved out to Jay Creek.

== Jay Creek ==
As the number of children living at The Bungalow grew to over 60 and there were increasing concerns over conditions there, and, in June 1925 the Secretary of the Aborigines Friends Association John H. Sexton stated "the environment of the Bungalow for half caste children is not conducive to their best interests". An additional concern was what would happen to the girls living at The Bungalow with the influx of construction workers to Stuart working on the approaching railway line.

A new site, 50 km (31 mi) west of Stuart, was identified at Jay Creek and a significant amount of developments were promised but were delayed, and a new site searched for when reliable water could not be found nearby. However, ultimately the plan was rushed as government officials were concerned what would happen to the girls living at The Bungalow with the influx of construction workers to Stuart working on the approaching railway line. So, in November 1928, Topsy Smith and Ida Standely, both of whom had wanted to leave, moved to Jay Creek with the Bungalow children (26 boys and 19 girls made the move) and living conditions there were just as poor as they were in town. The Reverend W Morgan Davies spent three days there and described it as "a standing disgrace to any civilised government" in a letter to his Bishop in July 1929.

During this period, between 1928 and 1929, the home was supervised by Ernest Eugene Kramer; alongside his wife Euphemia.

By 1932, the institution had "water problems" and a new site was proposed at the Alice Springs Telegraph Station.

== Alice Springs Telegraph Station ==
In 1932, The Bungalow moved to the old Alice Springs Telegraph Station, was proclaimed an Aboriginal reserve on 8 December 1932 with an area of 273 ha (670 acres); this made the land officially "off-limits" for non-Aboriginal people. The site had been vacated by the telegraph staff in the months before and significant alterations were made to the buildings and genuine effort was put in to making it comfortable with, amongst other additions, a large corrugated-iron dormitory was built with rows of double bunks where girls slept in the eastern wings and boys in the western and, for the first time, flushing toilets were available.

Emily Liddle (née Perkins), who was 11 when she moved to the new location said: "When we came here, Telegraph, we were shocked to see beds and mattresses. Coming into a mansion after sleeping on concrete floors. We were shocked really... We rushed around and they said, oh, they even got a shower and bathtubs."

However, the new site was soon overcrowded, and it appeared that not enough resources were made available; this was particularly apparent after 33 boys were moved from the Pine Creek Home.

In 1934 the Superintendent of The Bungalow, Gordon Keith Freeman, who had been appointed in 1930, was arrested for the rape of a 16-year-old girl in the dormitories late at night. This girl wrote a letter to the Deputy Administrator Victor Carrington to report the rape and begun her letter with the words "I am longing to have someone help me". Carrington took immediate action and took sworn statements from other girls at The Bungalow and from staff and found that it had not been an isolated incident and, in the subsequent trial, the accuser and five of her fellow Bungalow residents gave evidence against him; additional evidence was given by Hetty Perkins. Freeman was found guilty, dismissed from his position, and fined £100, but being unable to pay was instead sentenced for three months. Many people did not think this was a suitable punishment with some believing it was too light and many that it was too harsh and, ultimately, he served only 30 days of the sentence.

The Bungalow closed in 1942 when children were evacuated south in response to World War II. The majority of the children from the institution were sent south to Mulgoa in New South Wales and Balaklava in South Australia. Following this, the army transformed the buildings into a labour camp for Aboriginal workers during World War II.

The Bungalow reopened in 1945 as an Aboriginal reserve for adult workers, eventually closing in 1960.

== Notable people ==
=== Residents ===
- Alec Kruger, activist
- Alec Ross, tour guide
- Bob Randall, elder, singer and community leader
- Edith Espie, jockey and community leader
- Herbie Laughton, country music singer
- Joseph (Joe) Croft, Aboriginal activist
- Topsy Glynn, and her two daughters
  - Freda Glynn, co-founder of CAAMA
  - Rona Glynn, first Indigenous teacher and nurse in Alice Springs
- Wally McArthur, rugby league player

=== Staff ===
- Elsie Muriel Jones
- Olive O'Keeffe
- Hetty Perkins
- Topsy Smith
- Ida Standley

== See also ==
- Kahlin Compound (Darwin)
- Pine Creek Home
- St. Mary's Hostel (Alice Springs)
- Stolen Generations
