= Ernest Eugene Kramer =

Australian missionary (1889–1958)

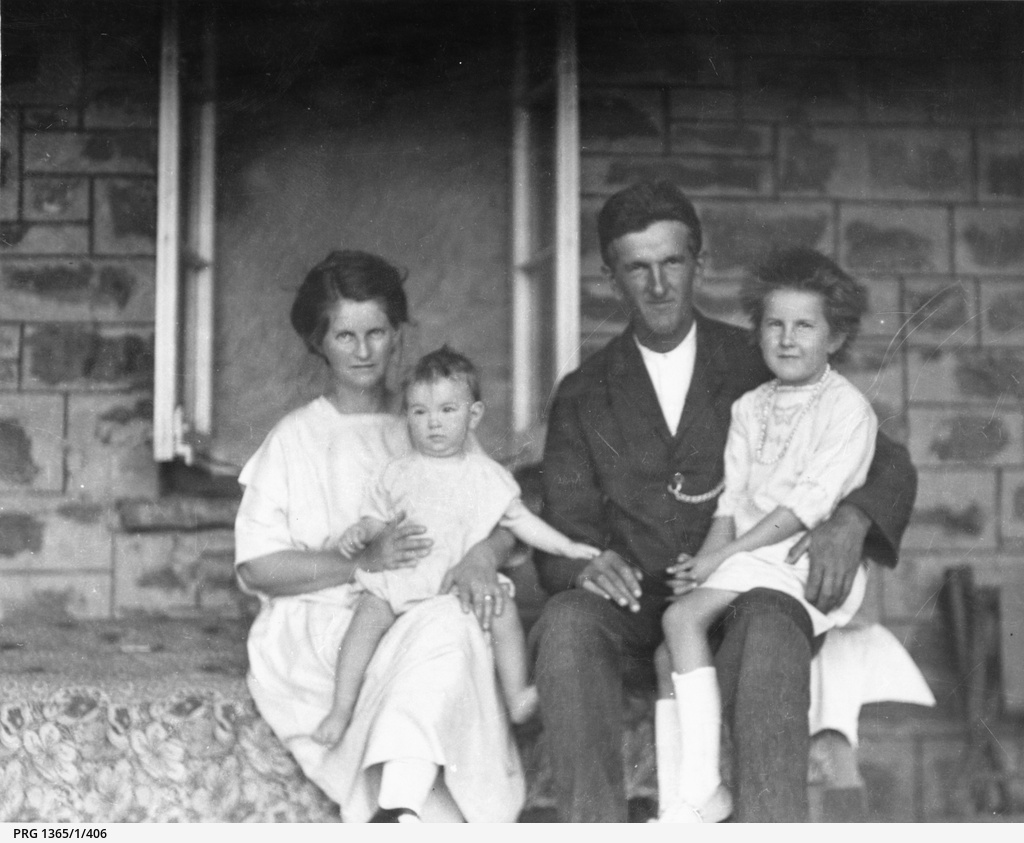
Ernest and Euphemia Kramer and their children in about 1924

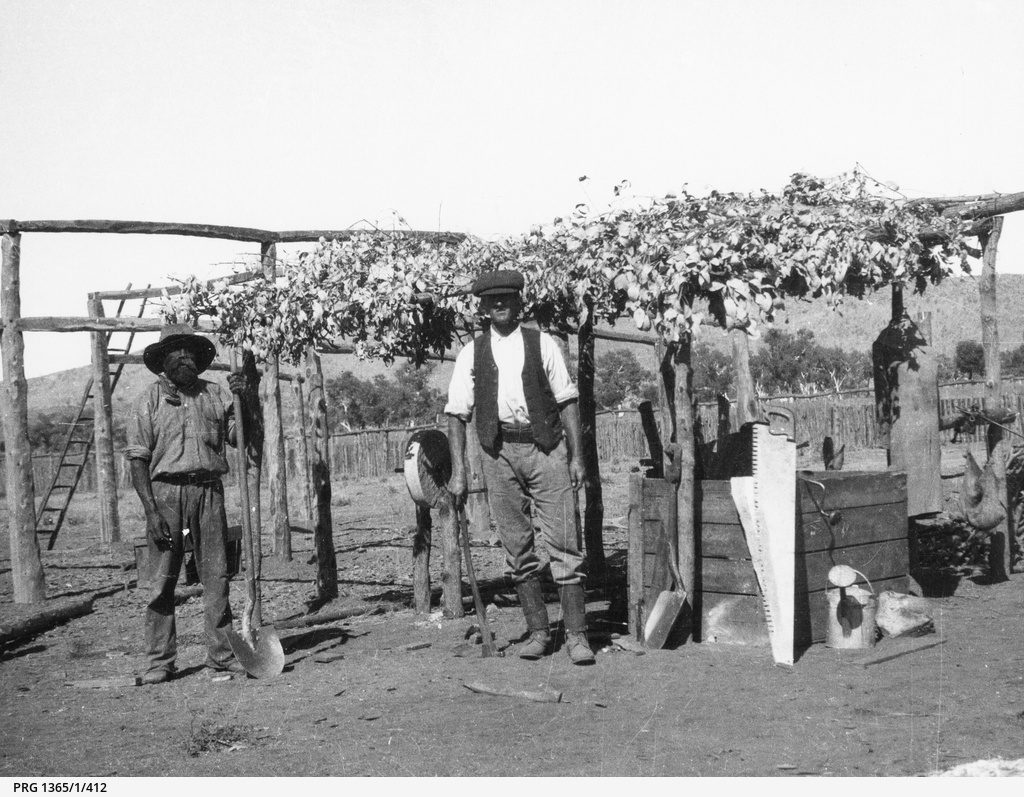
Kramer building a shelter, likely alongside Arrernte Elder Micky Dow Dow. c. 1924

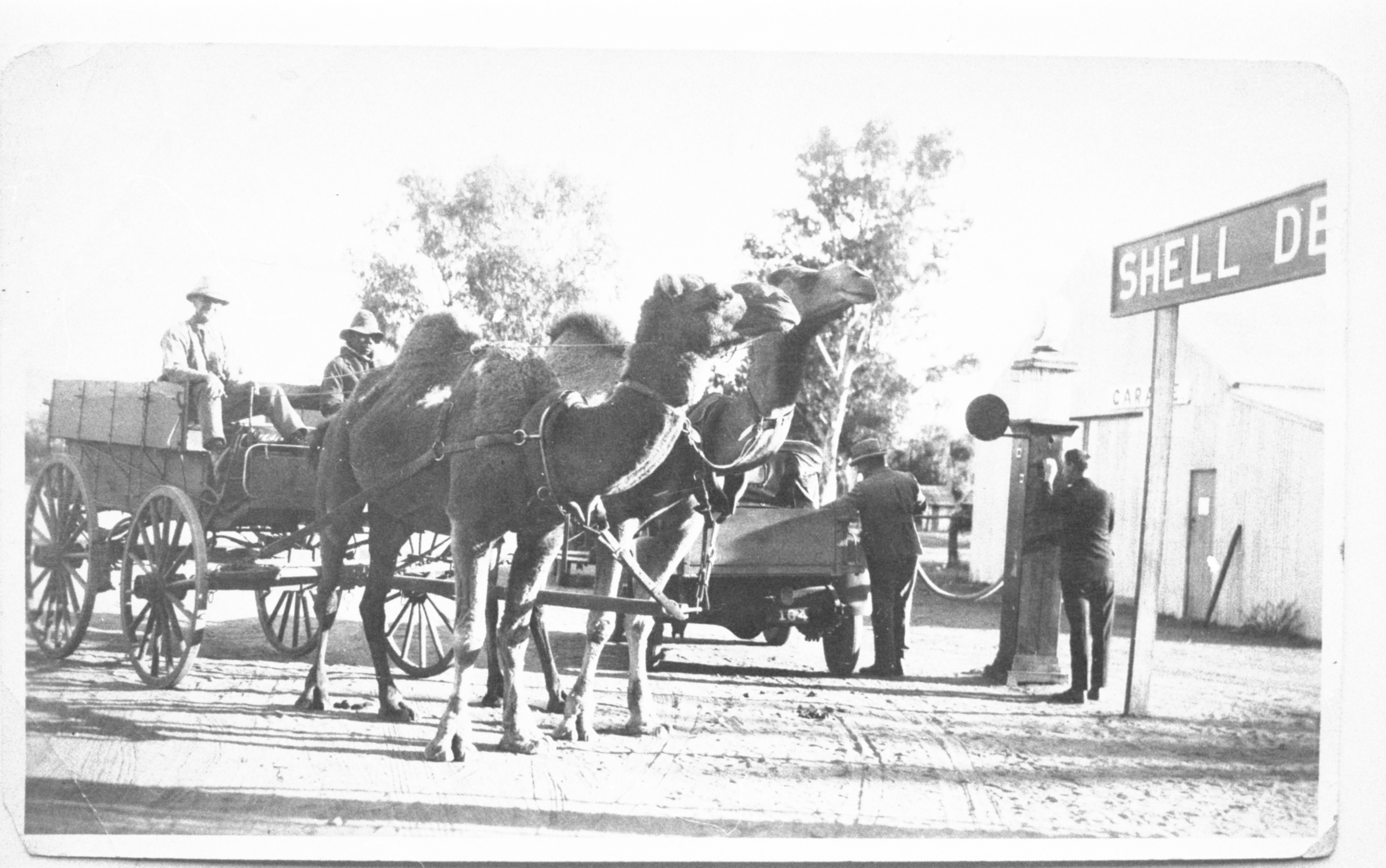
Kramer on a trip to Alice Springs (Mparnwte) with his camels in 1928

Ernest Eugene Kramer (10 May 1889 – 16 February 1958) was a non-denominational itinerant missionary who worked in Central Australia, mostly Alice Springs, from 1913 until 1934 and who is known for his camel train caravan mission. Kramer was responsible for building the first church in Alice Springs, the Ebenezer Tabernacle (which was commonly known as Kramer's Church).

== Early life ==
Kramer was born on 10 May 1889 in Basel, Switzerland and his German-born storekeeper parents, Karl Friedrich and Maria Elisabeth Kramer. He attended school locally and trained as a milling engineer. In 1909, after the stress of work caused a nervous breakdown, he emigrated to South Australia where he worked at a mill in Salisbury, and it is here that he converted to Christianity, having previously identified as agnostic. Following this conversion, he rode his bike from Adelaide to Melbourne where he met and married another recent convert, Euphemia Buchanan, after a brief courtship on 21 March 1912.

In 1913, following his marriage, Kramer had a 'call' to work with "people in the bush and [A]boriginals" so Euphemia, and their new son Colin, began travelling throughout South Australia; initially on the Murray River and then on to Port Augusta, Tarcoola, Quorn and Oodnadatta with additional expeditions into the Northern Territory. The growing family travelled in a covered wagon, pulled by donkeys, throughout very remote area and, as itinerant missionaries, had no regular income and were dependent on donations of food and money. Kramer recorded this period of their lives in the paper: Australian Caravan Mission to Bush People and Aboriginals.

== Life in the Northern Territory ==
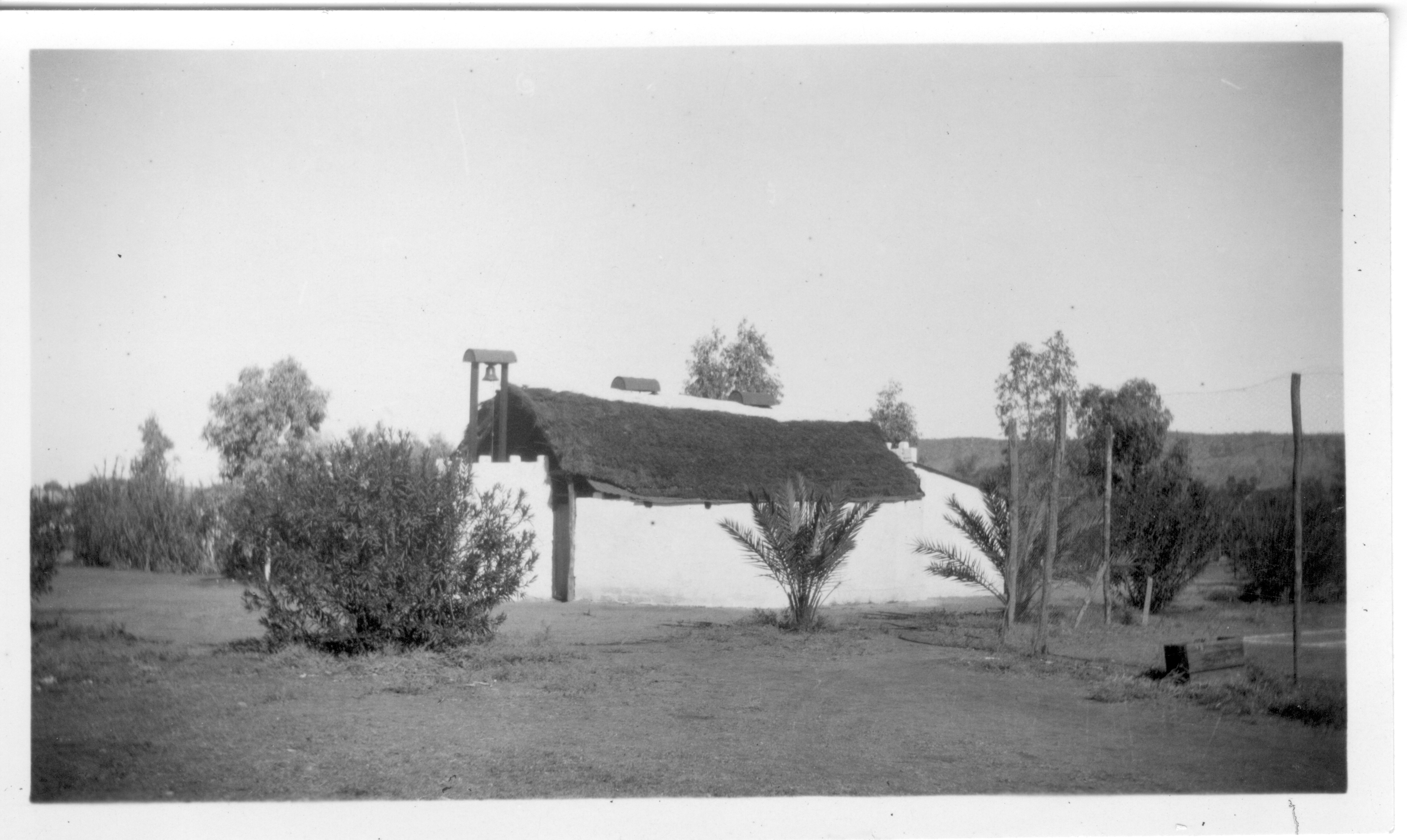
The church as pictured in 1930.

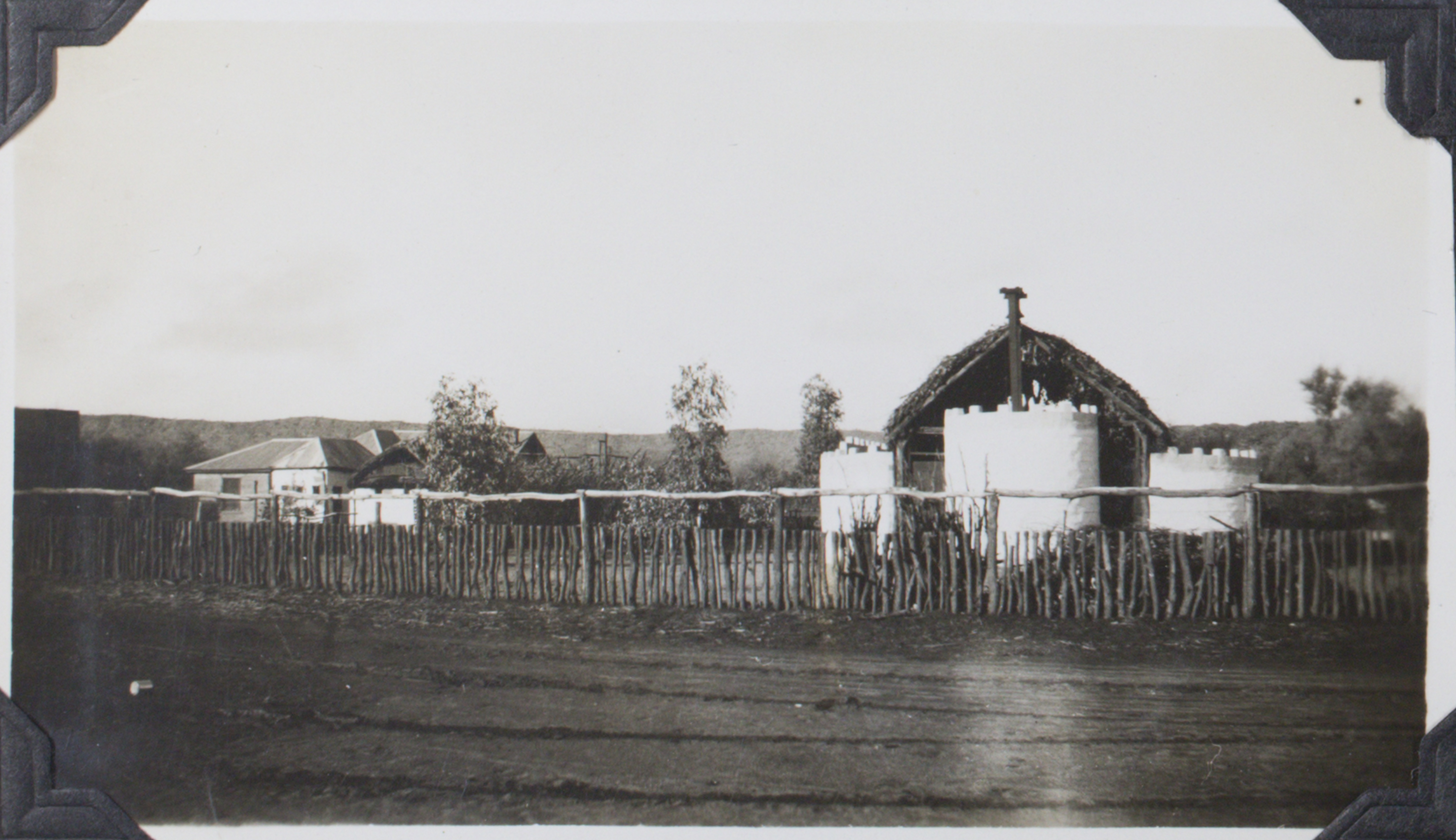
Ernest Eugene Kramer’s Tabernacle, also known as Ebenezer Tabernacle, circa 1931

Kramer, and his family moved to Alice Springs in 1923. In 1925, he was appointed Missionary for Central Australia by the Aborigines' Friends' Association where he helped local Arrernte people living in the town while also making frequent 'bush trips' in the cooler months by camel-team and motor car; taking with him food and medicines. In Alice Springs, on what is now the Coles carpark, Kramer built his home and the Ebenezer Tabernacle, which was the first concrete bricks used in Alice Springs and he was assisted in this by Arrernte Elder Micky Dow Dow. At the church Kramer and Euphemia hosted regular prayer meetings and used an Arrernte language translation of the Bible.

Kramer is remembered as being popular among Aboriginal people and, at a time of extreme racism, spoke for the humanity of Aboriginal people and drew attention to the suffering of people deprived of their land and access to watering places; despite this he also accepted the right of European people to appropriate the land. During his time in Alice Springs Kramer became a very influential figure and he had a status as an 'expert guide' and his knowledge of the Arrernte language and good relationships with both the European and Aboriginal populations.

In 1928–1929 Kramer supervised The Bungalow when it was at Jay Creek.

Kramer urged Aboriginal people to 'cease fighting among themselves' and leave cattle alone, and, in preference to sentencing Aboriginal people to prison, what then took place at the Stuart Town Gaol, he advocated for the use of corporal punishment under medical supervision. He also called for police intervention to protect Aboriginal women from domestic violence. The killing of two Aboriginal men at Mount Liebig in 1932 according to traditional law led Kramer to demand the prosecution of the killers for murder, leading to debate on the applicability of white law to traditional violence. The men were tried but acquitted by a Darwin jury.

In the early 1930s Kramer's relationship with the Aborigines' Friends' Association began to fracture and, with the increasing European population following the completion of the railway, forcing Aboriginal people out Alice Springs and attendance at the church went from 50 Aboriginal people to less than 10. This was definitely assisted by the implementation of a prohibited area meaning that Aboriginal people couldn't come within initially 5 miles (1928) and then 2 miles (1930) of the settlement.

It was for these reasons and his increasingly poor health that in 1934 Kramer retired, and he and Euphemia returned to Melbourne, where both continued to campaign for Central Australian Aboriginal welfare.

== Later life ==
In approximately 1950 Kramer moved to Adelaide where, on 16 February 1958, he died of acute leukaemia and was buried in Mitcham cemetery.

== Legacy ==
Kramer Street, in the Alice Springs suburb of Larapinta is named for Kramer.
