= Mona Minahan =

Australian businesswoman and hotelier (1897–1996)

Mona Minahan, also known as Mona Haines
- Born: Monica Augustine Minahan; 24 September 1897
- Died: 19 September 1996 (aged 98)
- Known for: Hotelier

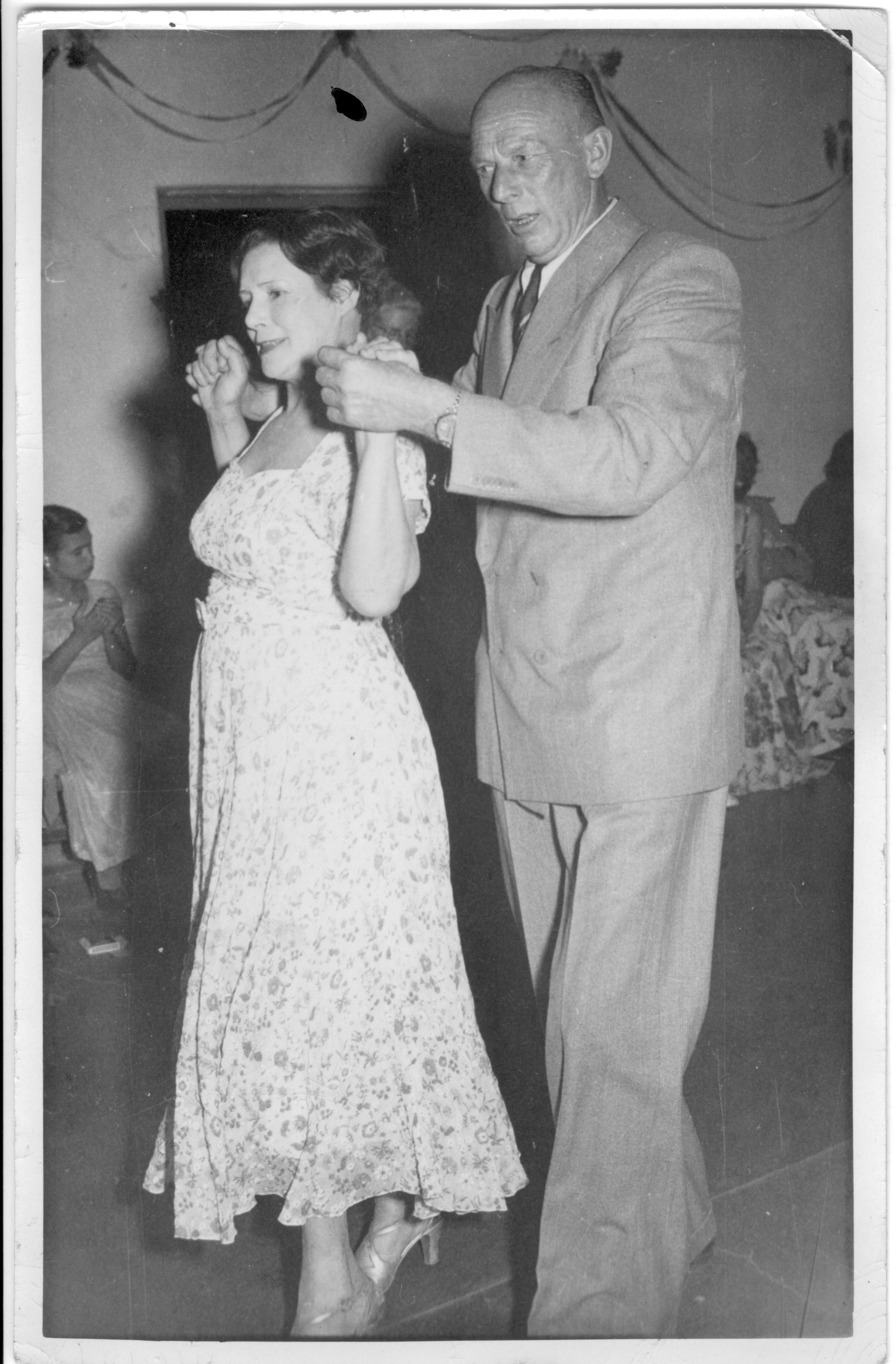
Minahan and Gus Brandt, c. 1940s

Monica Augustine “Mona” Minahan, (24 September 1897 – 19 September 1996) also known as Mona Haines, was an Australian businesswoman. She lived in Alice Springs and was responsible for building the Riverside Hotel, later known as the Todd Tavern, the town's largest hotel to that point.

She also became a leading figure in the town and was made a Member of the Order of the British Empire in 1980.

== Early life ==
Minahan was born in inner-city Adelaide and was the fifth of eight children of William Lott and Annie Marrie Minahan. After World War I she began managing her mother's hotels there which included the Oxford, Henley Beach and Buck's Head hotels. She also began investing in property in Adelaide.

== Northern Territory ==
Minahan arrived in Alice Springs (Mparntwe) in late 1932 to visit her sister Eileen Kilgariff who then held the lease of the Stuart Arms Hotel and she was impressed by it. In an oral history interview Minahan stated that, from her impression of the town from the Alice Springs railway station, she was unimpressed - wanting to leave as soon as the next train - but soon changed her mind as people rushed to assist her and carry her luggage. She began working at the hotel, and a number of their other businesses including another pub at Barrow Creek, and it acknowledged as being the first barmaid there.

She said of the town:

It was like a real terrific country town. Everybody knew everybody. You could walk along the street and everyone who passed you knew. There was about 250 people here at the time. No running water, no nothing.

— Mona Minahan, as quoted in "Legends of the Red Heart" (2002) by Shirley Brown

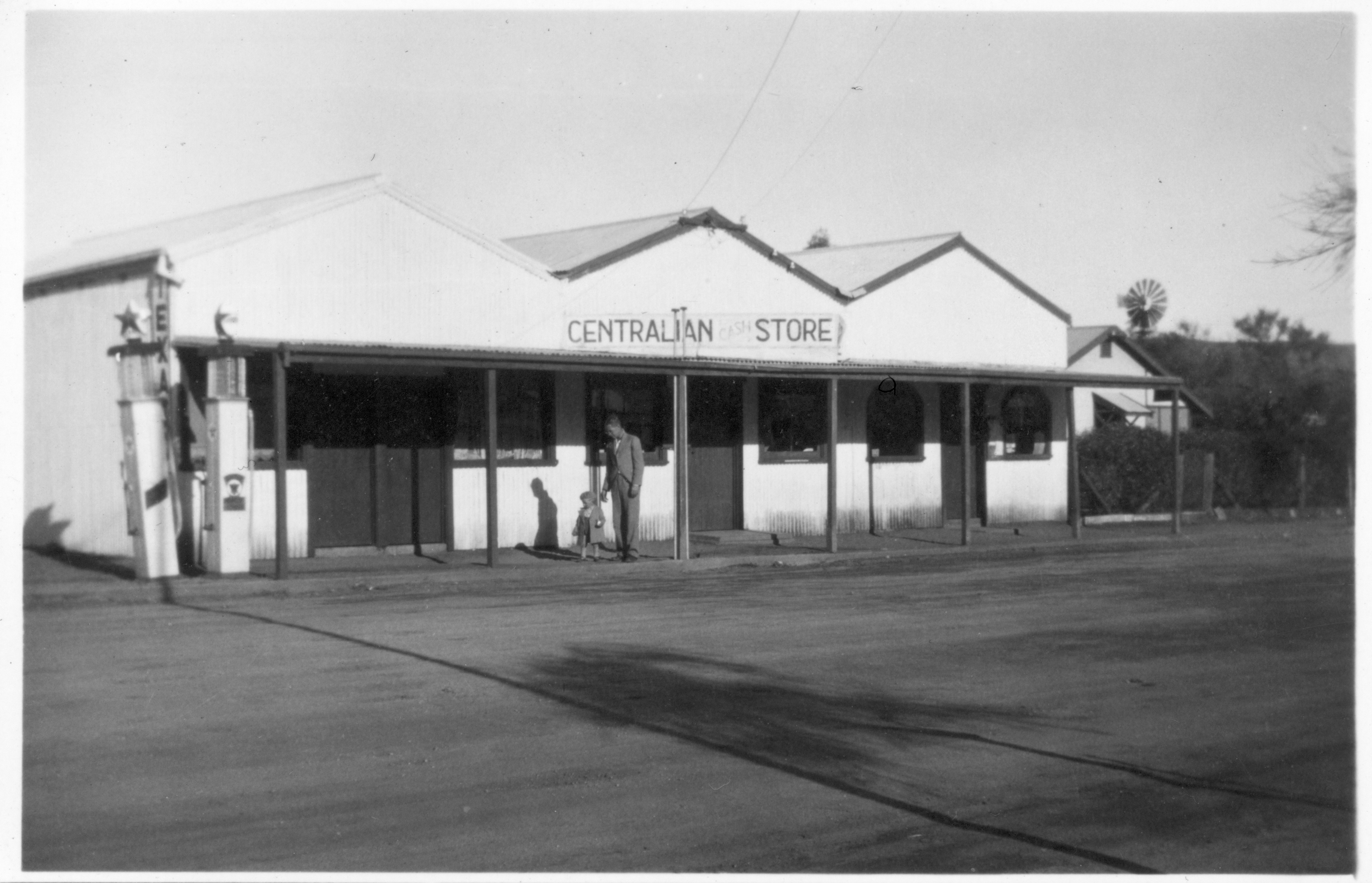
Minahan's store on the Todd Mall, 1941

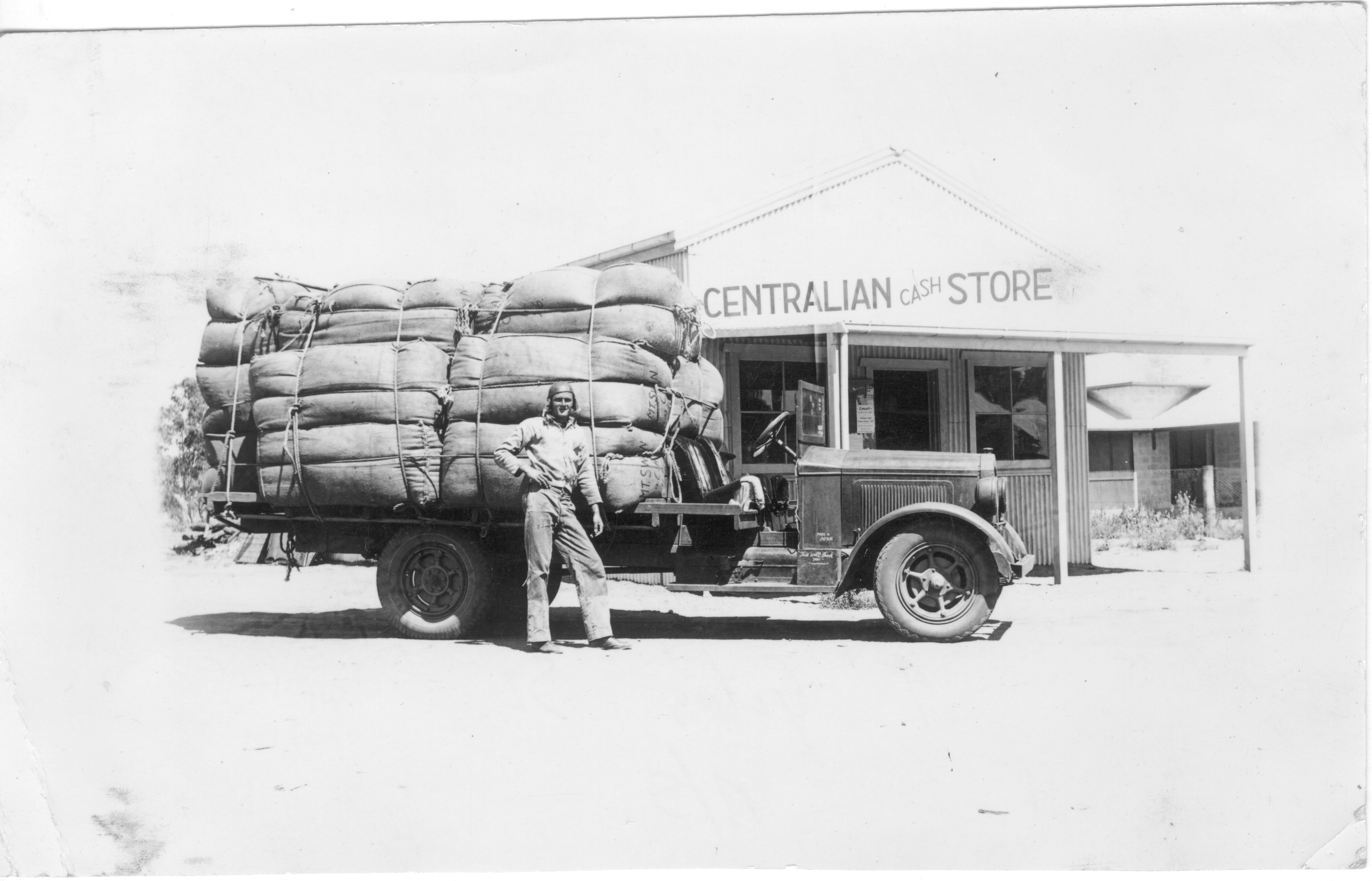
Minahan's store on the Todd Mall, undated

In 1936 her sister left Alice Springs and Minahan moved to Tennant Creek, where she attempted to purchase the Tennant Creek Hotel but it went to someone else and she was successful in purchasing a quarter share of the Tennant Creek Trading Company. In 1937 she returned to Alice Spring and opened the Centralian Cash Store on Todd Street in partnership with Joe Costello who she had met in Tennant Creek; this business was successful and they went on to open stores elsewhere in the region. Minahan would also open a dress shop as she felt there was no where in the town to buy dresses for more formal events.

Because of the success and importance of this business to the region Minahan, unlike other civilian women, did not have to evacuate Alice Springs during World War II and this was due, in large part, to her friendship with Brigadier Noel Loutit, who had jurisdiction over all the troops and staging camps between Alice Springs and Larrimah. Loutit would also ensure that Minahan had suitable wares for her store and the two would go in to business together although, when he returned to Alice Springs after the war with his wife Minahan ended the partnership and he established a rival general store (Loutit's General Store). By 1954, she rose to prominence, becoming "one of Central Australia’s best-known identities."

In the late 1940s Minahan entered a business and personal partnership with Arthur Ronald Haines who had recently arrived in Alice Springs and they began living together. They would go on to marry in the 1970s.

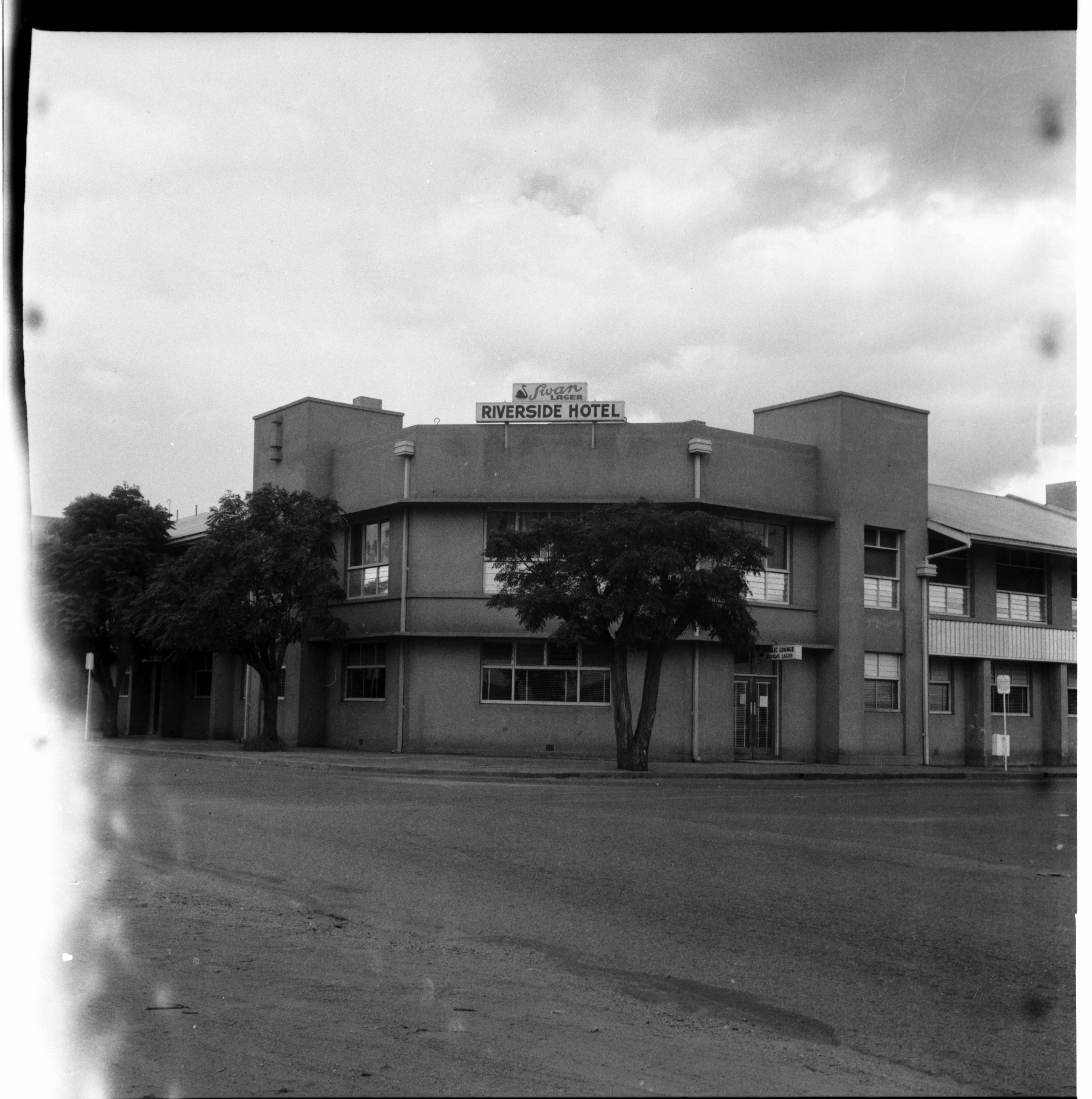
The Riverside Hotel soon after completion, c. 1960

In 1953 Minahan began construction of the Riverside Hotel which was designed by architect Beni Burnett and, due to large financial stalls and the death of Burnett, the project did not reach completion until 24 March 1959. Soon after the hotel opened and struggling to manage the pressures of both businesses Minahan sold Centralian Traders to Woolworths and later, when ready to retire, she sold the Riverside Hotel in 1973.

In an interview with the Centralian Advocate Minahan stated that she had "a chequered career, mostly short of money, as a washerwoman, barmaid, housemaid and breakfast cook" and said that one of her only regrets was not having children to pass her hotel on to.

Minahan was made a Member of the Order of the British Empire (MBE) in 1980.

She died on 19 September 1996.

== Legacy ==
The Minahan Medal, an annual award for the best and fairest male player in the Central Australian Football League (CAFL), was donated by Minahan in 1947. The members' bar at Traeger Park Oval is also named for her and is known as 'Mona's Lounge'.

Minahan Road, in the Alice Springs suburb of Ross is named for her.
