= Annie Meyers =

Australian guest house owner (1873–1942)

The Meyers residence with the family standing at the front, this would later become 'Stuarts Guest Home', 1908

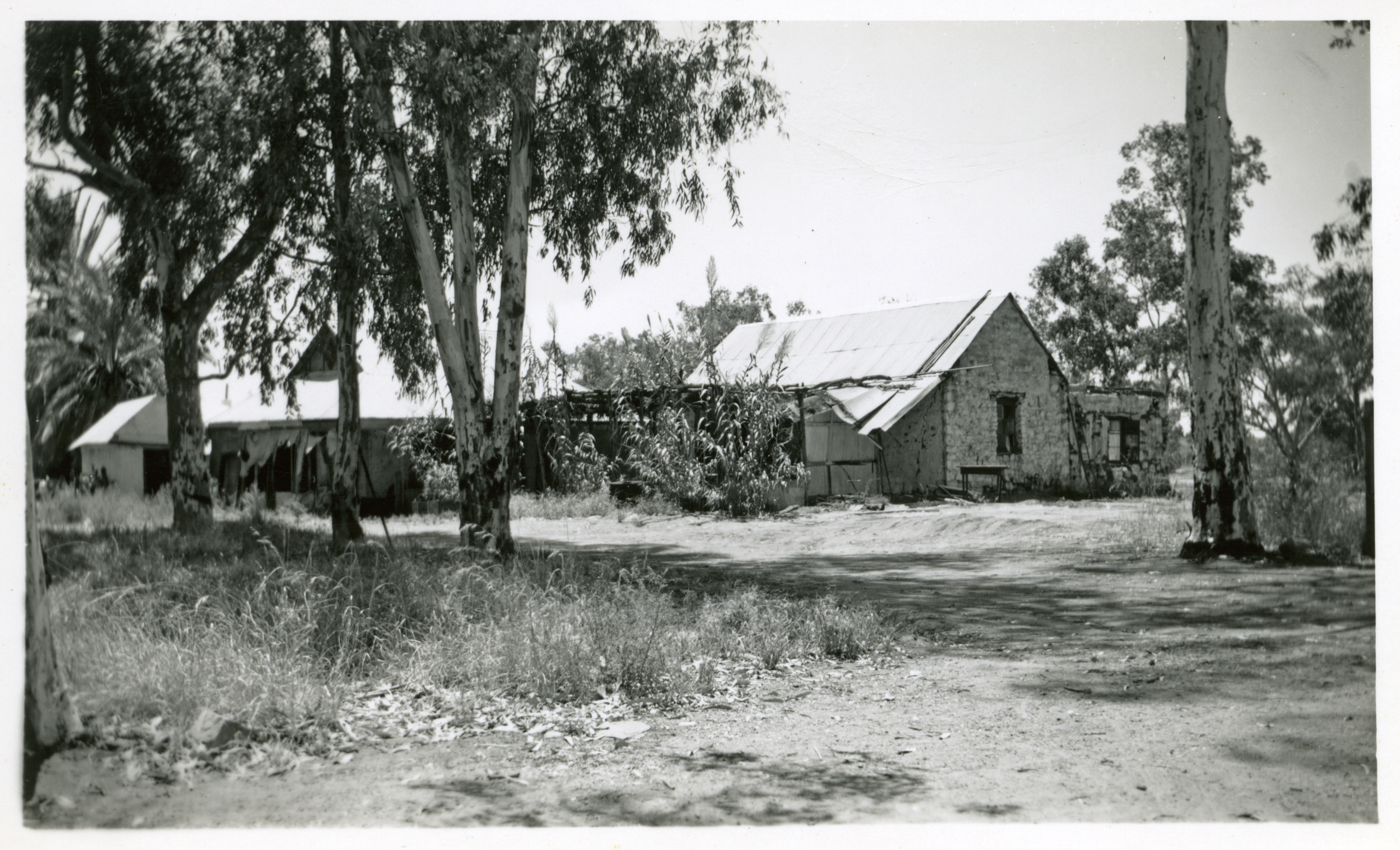
Stuarts Guest Home, sometimes referred to as Mrs Meyers' Guest House, in 1951

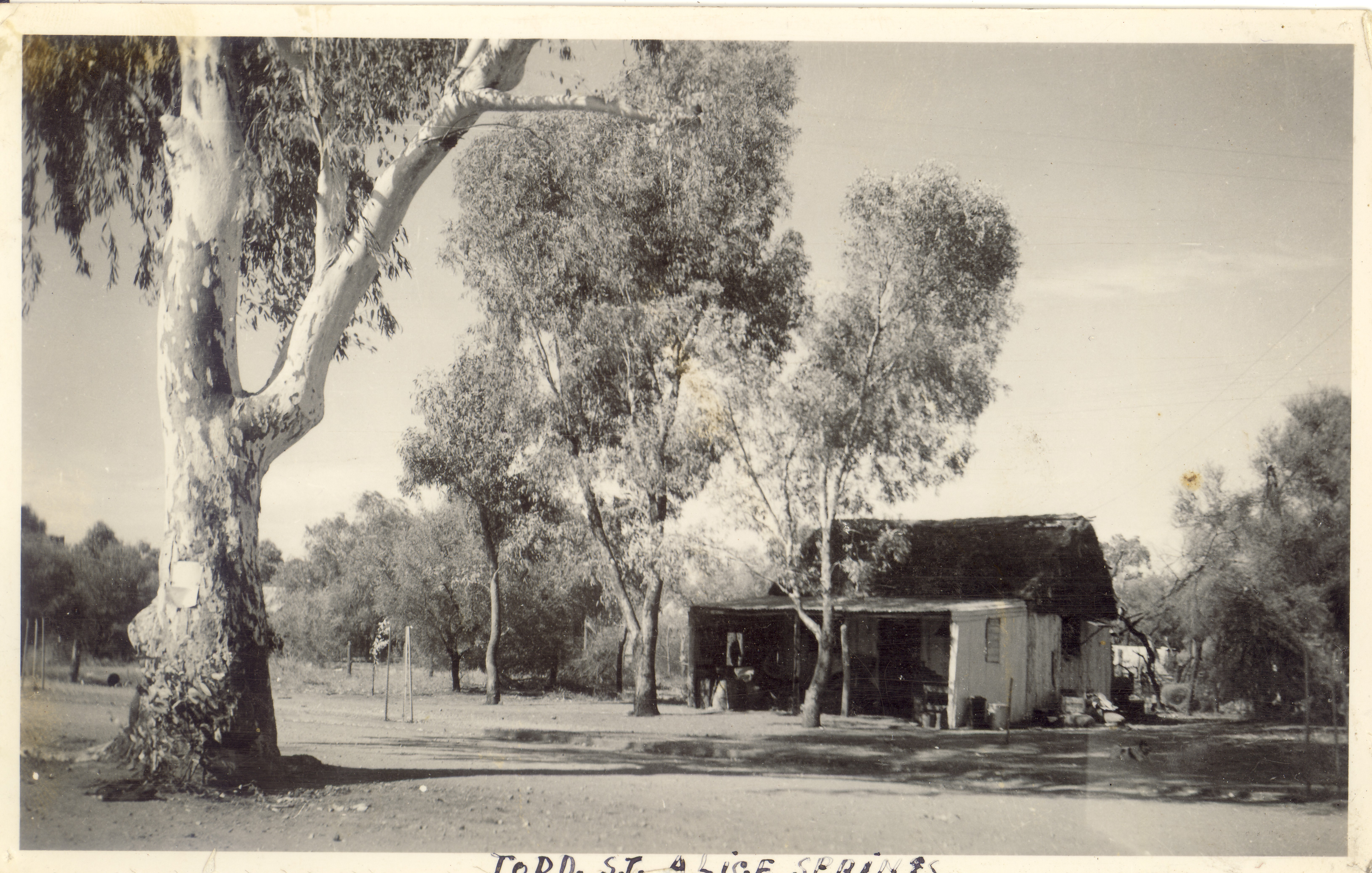
The Charlie Meyers Saddlery on Todd Street

Annie Meyers (7 July 1873 – 25 January 1942) was the owner of the first guest house called 'Stuarts Guest Home', sometimes referred to as 'Mrs Meyers Guest House', in Alice Springs in the Northern Territory.

== Early life ==
Meyers was born in Cornwall and immigrated with her family the Moonta, South Australia when she was three years old. In Moonta her family worked as copper miners.

== Life in the Northern Territory ==
Meyers moved to Alice Springs, then known as Stuart, in the late 1890s and began working at the Stuart Arms Hotel which was then being leased by Thomas and Maryanne Gunther. Little is known of her early life but her sister, Elizabeth (Bessie) Williams also lived in Stuart and later married Ernest Allchurch, who was then employed at a telegraphist at the Alice Springs Telegraph Station where he would later become the postmaster.

On 23 May 1897 Meyers married saddler Aaron Schunke (Charlie) Meyers at the hotel, where she was still working, and the wedding was officiated by the Lutheran Pastor John Bogner from Hermannsburg. Following their marriage the purchased a block of land on Todd Street, what is now the Todd Mall, and established a saddlery. This saddlery, known as "Charlie Meyer's Saddlery" was at the Southern end of the street and was a simple structure with whitewashed stone walls, a thatched roof and a verandah constructed of wooden packing cases. Meyers and Charlie lived a short distance away, on the Todd River and, by 1908, had three living children: Dorothy, Herman John (Jack) and Gwendoline (Gwen); they had lost an infant daughter Henrietta some years before. Meyers and her sister supported each other through their pregnancies and deliveries.

Meyers marriage was not a happy one and in 1909 she decided to leave Alice Springs and take her children 'south', likely to Adelaide, for schooling. She did not return until 1924 when her sister also came back. When Meyers returned she and her husband Charlie were still estranged and he was spending much of his time working at Haasts Bluff where he ran cattle and coming back to Alice Springs regularly for his saddlery and home-brew businesses. Meyers returned to their home on the river and, over the next two years, turned it into 'Stuarts Guest Home', the first boarding house in the town, which opened in 1926.

The guest home included a large vegetable garden, with many fruit trees and a large poultry run and, with these in place, she soon gained a reputation for serving the "best food in town". She applied for a liquor license in 1929 but was declined; she was, however, granted a publicans license in 1930 and the foundations for a new building were prepared but did not eventuate. Meyers blamed this on the Great Depression and the failure of The Granites gold mine.

Meyers gave up the guest home in the late 1930s and then moved to Adelaide and, later, to Boulder (Western Australia) where she lived with her daughter Gwen. She died there on 25 January 1942.

== Legacy ==
Olive Pink was a regular visitor at the 'Stuarts Guest Home' when she was working as an anthropologist at Thompsons Rockhole, which necessitated frequent visits to Alice Springs, and it was she who asked that, what was gazetted "Meyers Hill", be named "Annie Meyers Hill", part of Olive Pink Botanic Garden, after her. The Arrernte language name for this site is Tharrarletneme and it is a sacred site for Arrernte people.
