= Todd Mall =

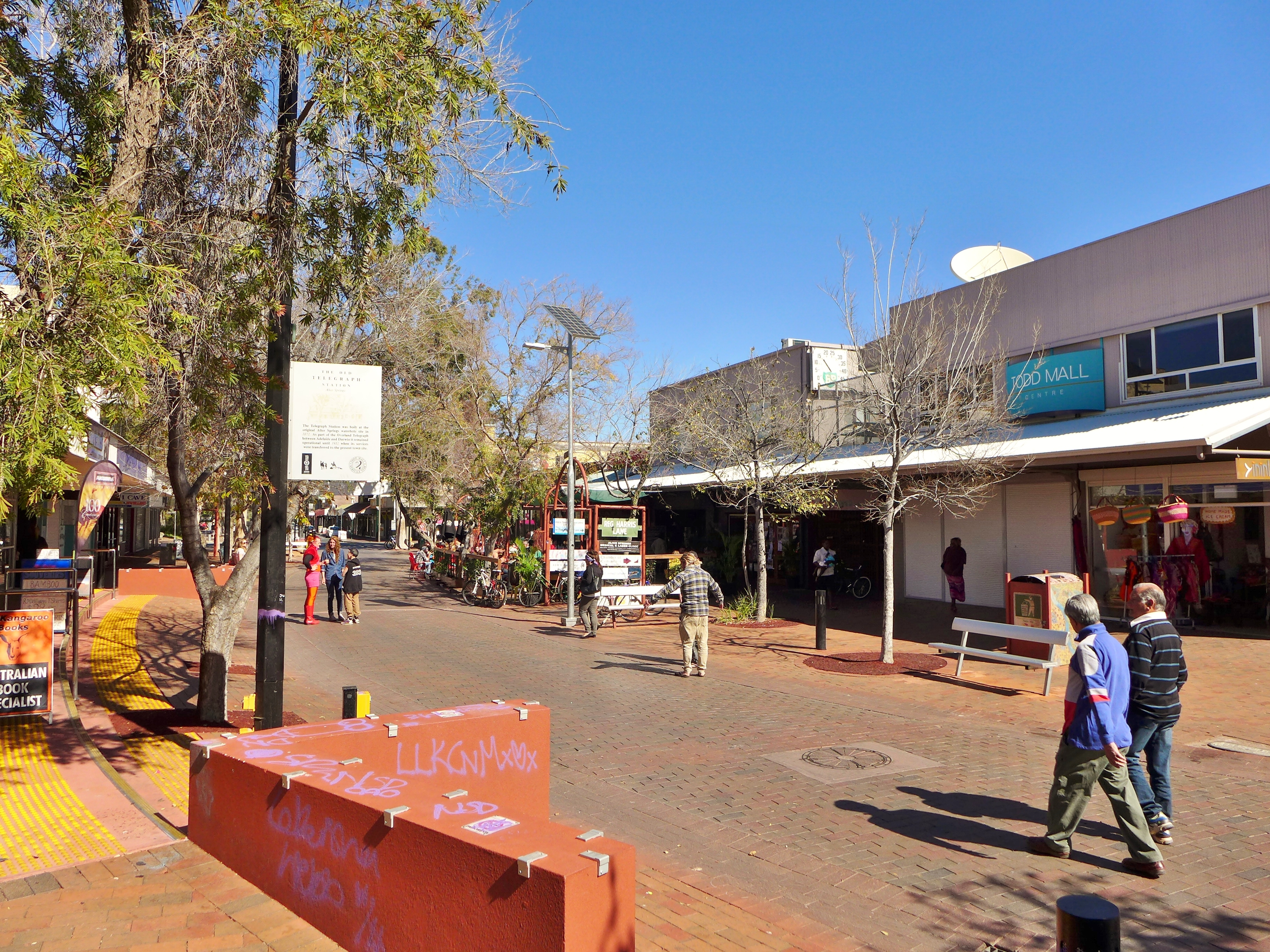
- Todd Mall in 2015
- Location: Alice Springs, Northern Territory, Australia
- Coordinates: 23°41′59″S 133°52′58″E
- Address: Tuit Lane, Alice Springs 0870
- Stores and services: 26

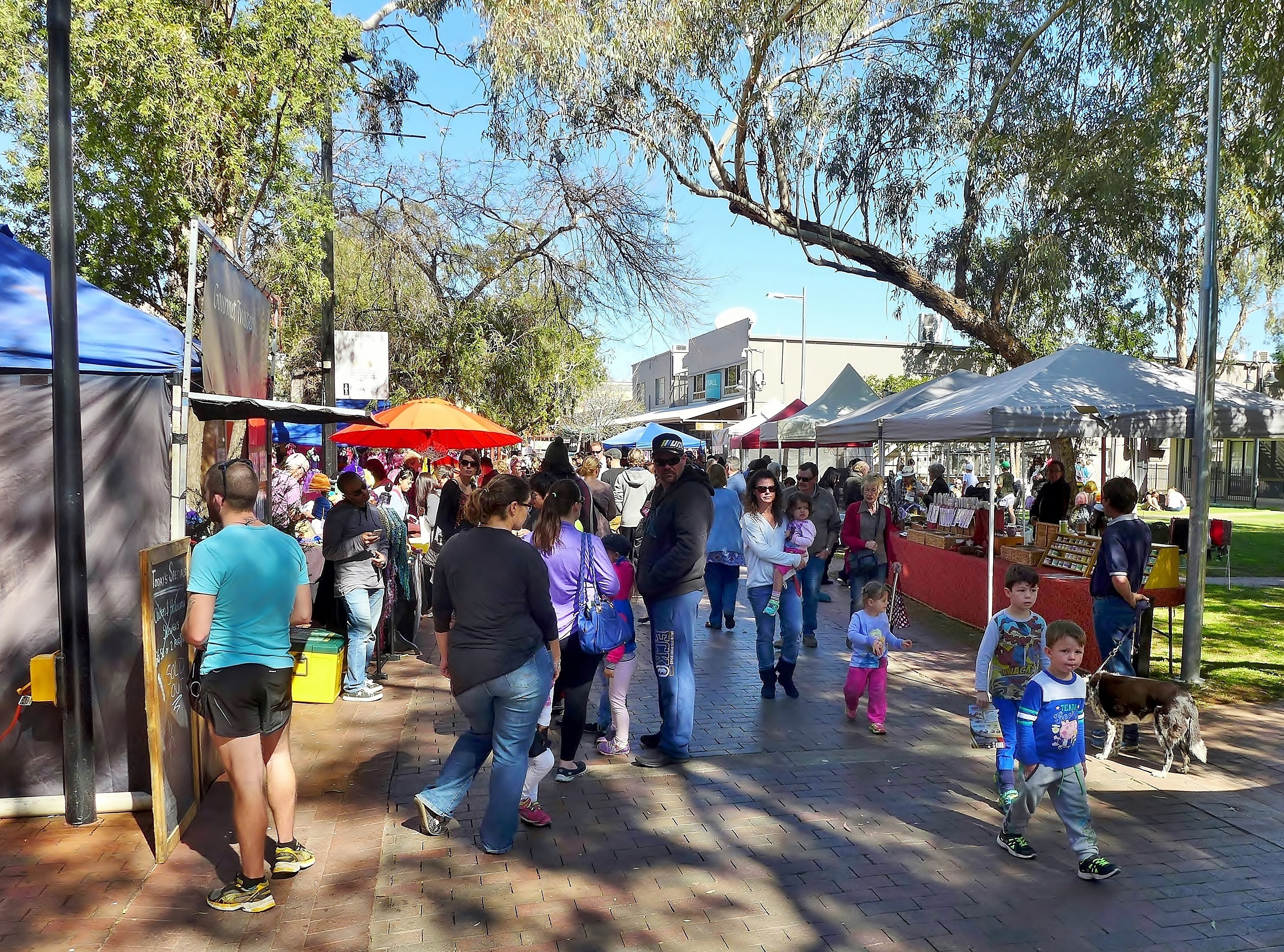
The Todd Mall Markets in 2015

The Todd Mall is a mostly pedestrian mall in Alice Springs in the Northern Territory of Australia which serves as its "main street" and is one of the primary locations for shopping and leisure in the town. It contains many of the town's restaurants.

Fortnightly, from mid-March to early December, it also hosts the "Todd Mall Markets" as well as a number of "Night Markets" throughout the year. The Todd Mall is also the location of the Alice Springs Town Council's annual "Christmas Carnival" which features the lighting of the council's Christmas Tree on the Council Lawns.

== History ==
The Todd Mall is part of the first 104 lots of land released in the original township of Stuart which were released in 1888. From the very beginning the area now called Todd Mall, the northern section of what was then Todd Street, was considered the town's commercial centre; especially after the Stuart Arms Hotel was built (this is now the location of Alice Plaza).

== Development ==
Significant developments were made to the Todd Mall in the following years:

- 1978; it was turned into a semi-mall; with one way traffic (and it was affectionately known as the Small)
- 1987; it became a fully pedestrian mall
- 2013; the far northern part of the Mall was opened again to cars in an effort to revitalise the mall

== Buildings and tenants ==
- Adelaide House Museum
- AIATSIS Central Australia
- Alice Plaza (previously Ford Plaza)
- Alice Springs Cinema
- Alice Springs Visitor Information Centre
- Aurora Alice Springs (Hotel)
- Cafe Uccelo
- Epilogue Cafe and Lounge
- Jila Arts
- John Flynn Memorial Church
- Lone Dingo
- Megafauna Central
- Mixed Lollies (Clothing)
- Outback Cycling
- Outbush
- Page 27 (Cafe)
- Piccolo's Cafe and Restaurant
- Red Kangaroo Books
- Sporties Restaurant
- Sugar & Spice Children’s Boutique
- The Bakery, Alice Springs
- The Goods (Cafe)
- Todd Tavern

=== Former tenants ===
- Charlie Meyers Saddlery (operated by Charlie and Annie Meyers)
- Eager Beavers (Grocery)
- Gum Tree Cafe
- Leaping Lizards Gallery
- Mbantua Fine Art Gallery
- Murray Neck
- Red Dog Cafe
- Stuart Arms Hotel
- Talapi (Gallery)
- The Gem Gave (also the site of the first library in 1953)
- The Lane (Restaurant)
- Uncle Edy's Ice Cream (closed 2020)
- Wallis Fogarty Store
- Windles Garage

== Gallery of historic images ==
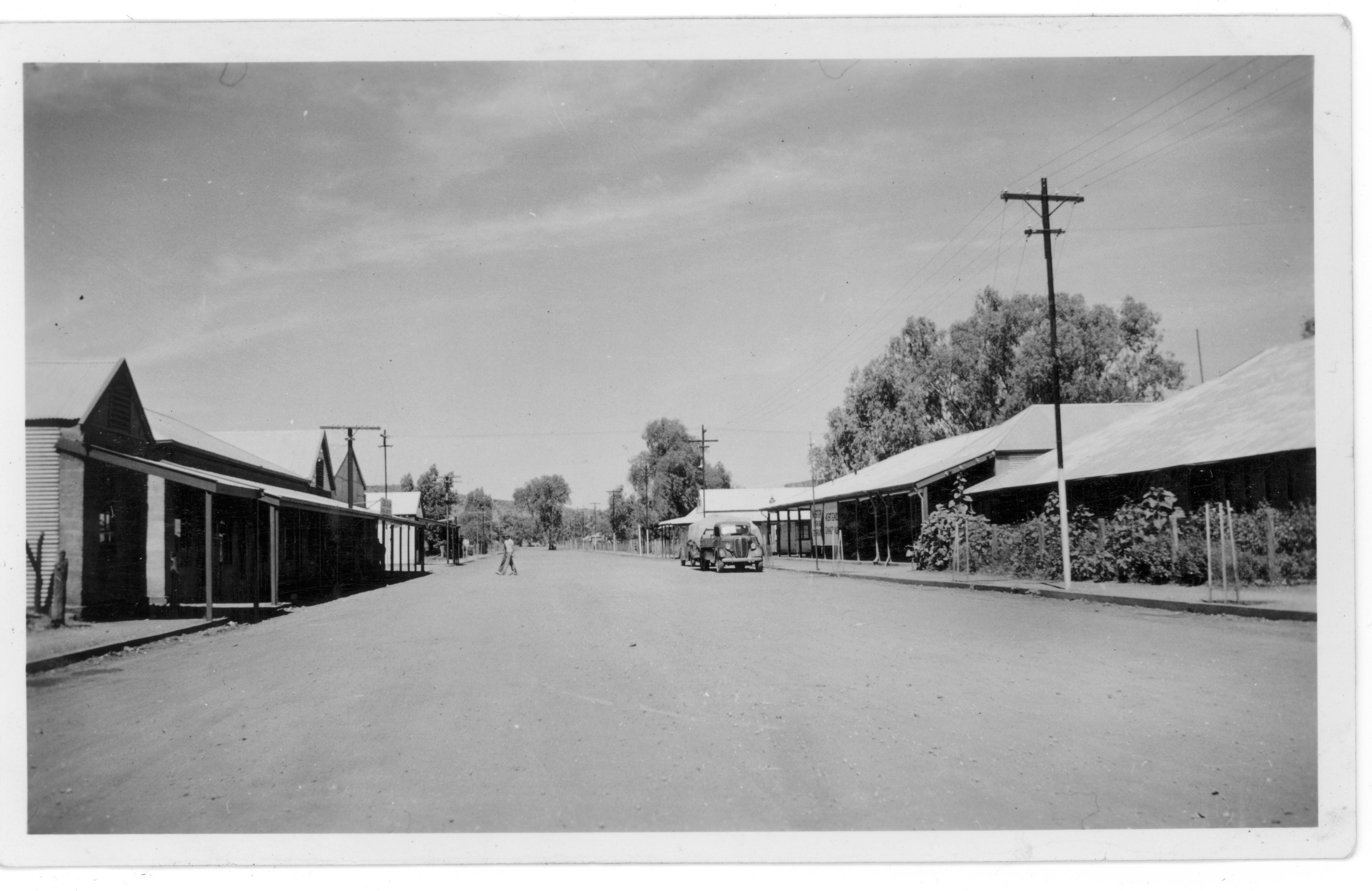
Todd Street, now the Todd Mall, c.1937

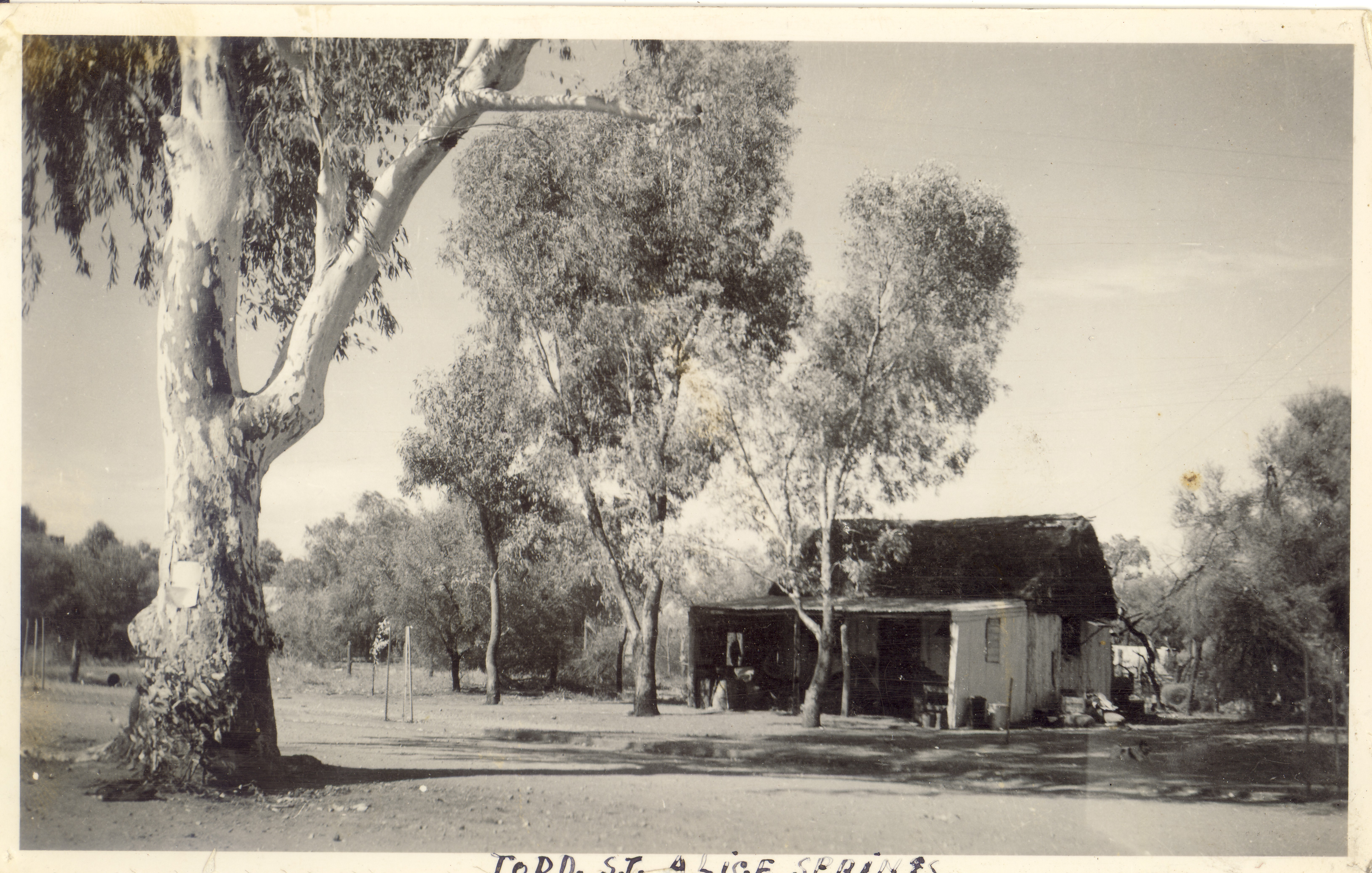
Charlie Meyers saddlery on what is now the Todd Mall, c.1930s

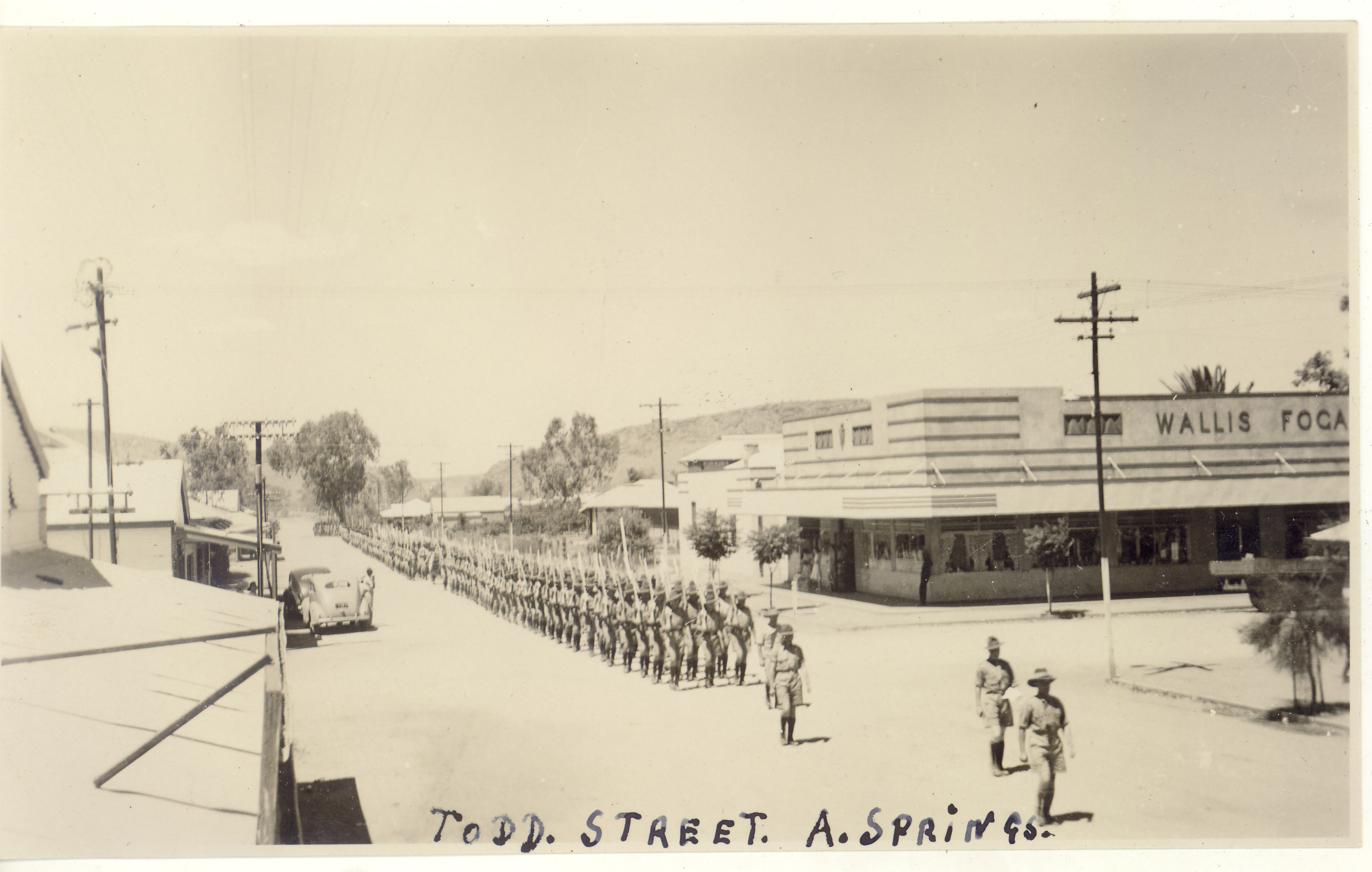
A march on Todd Street during World War II, image shows Wallis Fogarty's Store, 1938 - 1948

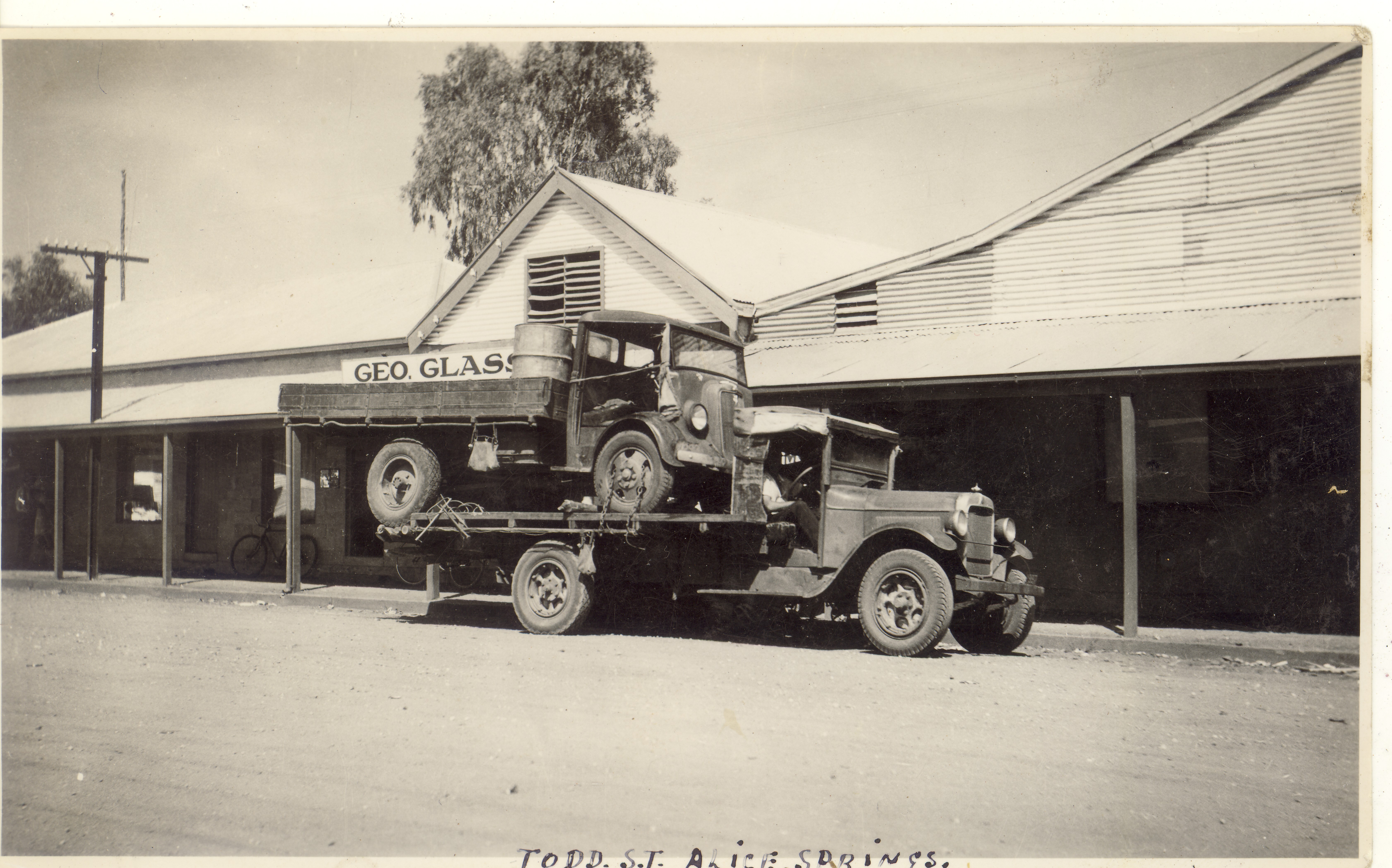
Todd Street, 1938 - 1948

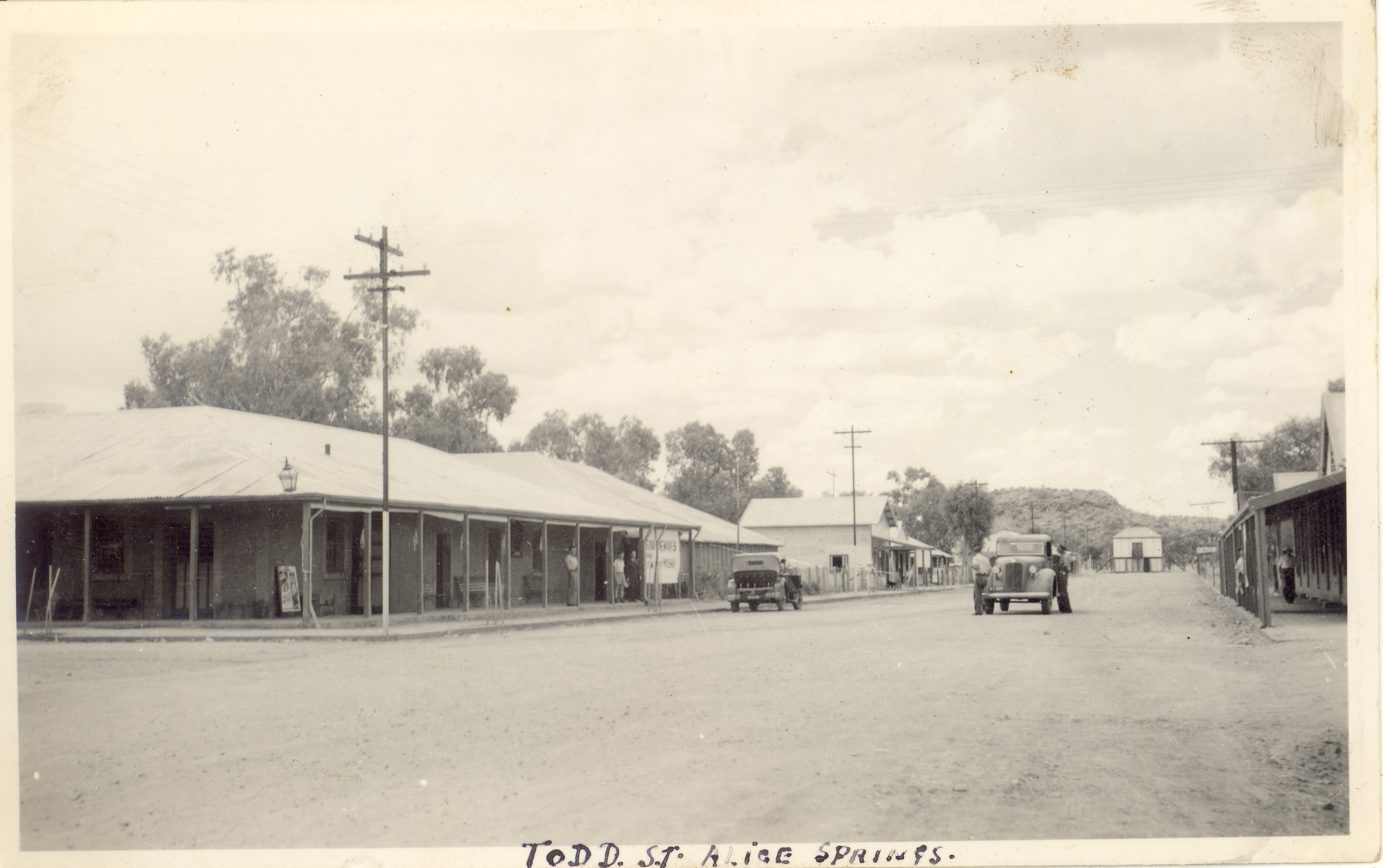
Todd St, Alice Springs, looking north, 1938 - 1948

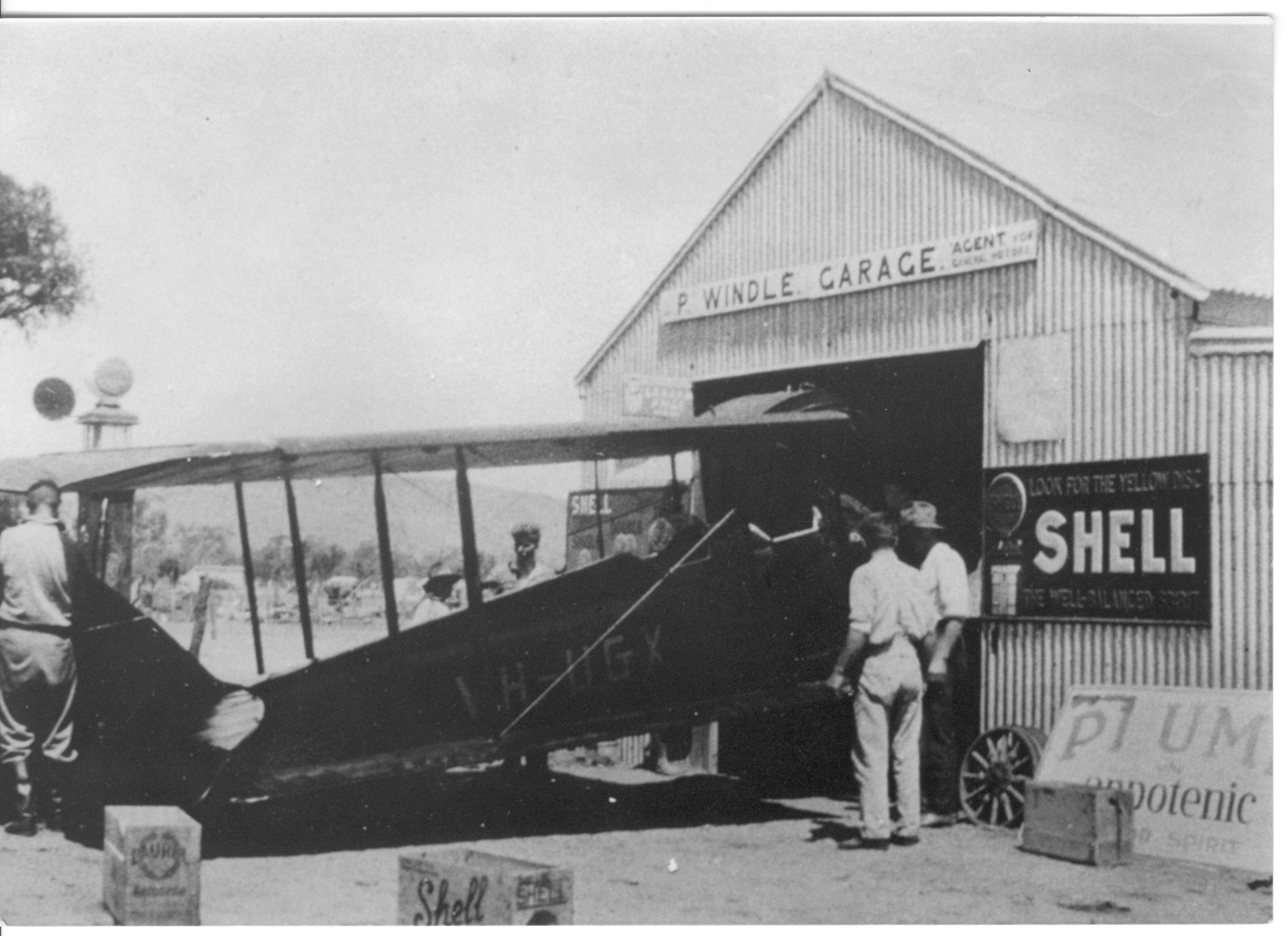
Windle's Garage on Todd Mall, with the Gold Quest II out the front (this plane was used in the search for Lasseter, circa 1950s

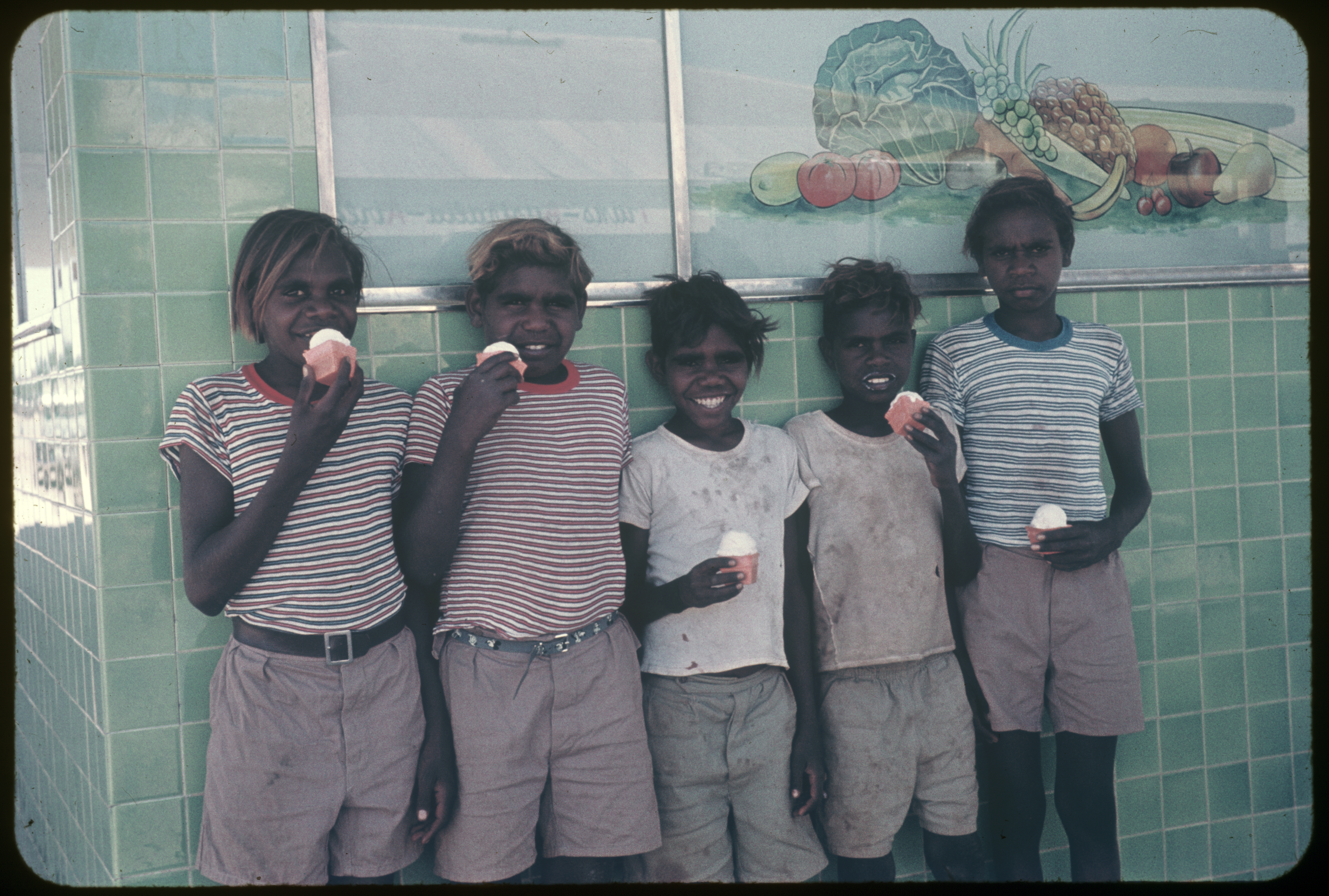
Aboriginal boys outside Heenan's Milk Bar on the Todd Mall in 1957 or 1958

== See also ==
- List of shopping centres in Australia
