= Stuart Arms Hotel =

Hotel in Alice Springs, Australia

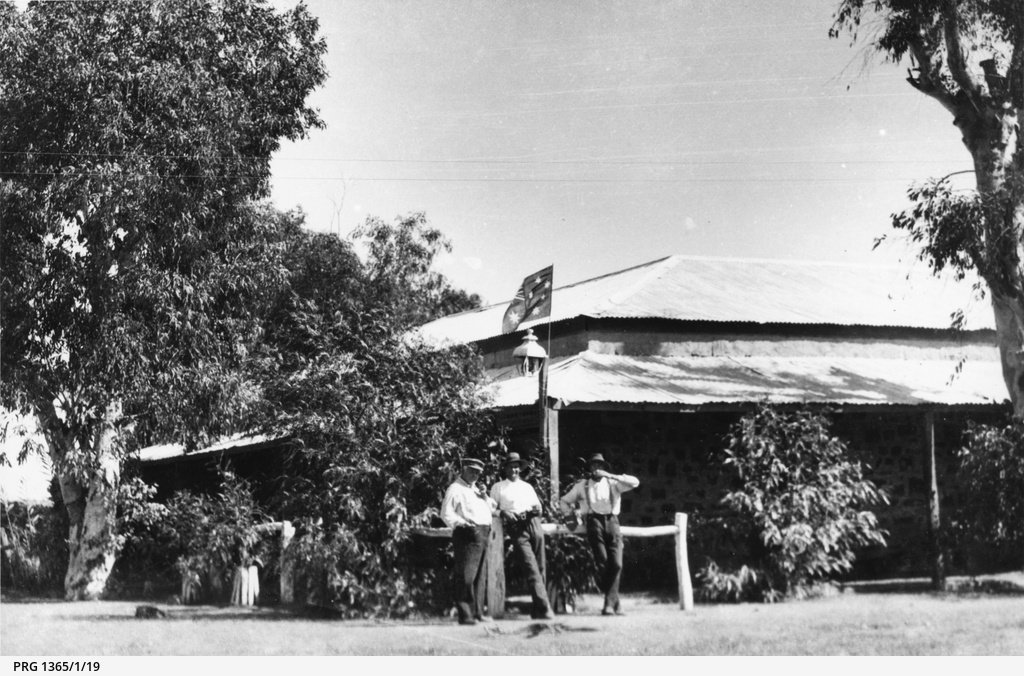
- The Stuart Arms Hotel, 1924

- Location within Northern Territory

General information
- Location: Todd Street, Alice Springs
- Coordinates: 23°41′56″S 133°52′59″E
- Opening: 1889
- Closed: 1986
- Management: William Benstead

The Stuart Arms Hotel was the first hotel in Alice Springs, Northern Territory (which was originally called Stuart). Located on the corner of Parsons and Todd Street, it was centre of social life for 96 years.

== History ==
The Stuart Arms Hotel was established by pioneer pastoralist William Benstead, who received his publican's license in 1888. It was initially intended to be named the "Great Northern Hotel"; when the date and nature of the name change is not known. Benstead purchased lot 78 and 79 of the just gazetted town of Stuart on 9 April 1889. The hotel was erected on lot 78, "a modest structure of stone and iron, about the size of an average house".

Benstead left town in 1892 and leased the Stuart Arms to Thomas Gunter, initially on a five-year lease, but Gunter stayed until 1900.

Charles Rutherford South then took over the pub for seven years. During this time Benstead, who still owned the establishment foreclosed in 1902, and it was sold to William Garnet South in 1903.

In 1914 "The Bungalow" was built at the rear of the hotel, sharing the lot, where Topsy Smith and Mariah McDonald, cared for "halfe-caste" children in a galvanised iron shed that Robert Stott had built; 16 children were living there by November 1914. Living conditions at "The Bungalow" were less than ideal and food could be limited so the children would often look for scraps at the hotel. They remained in the hotel's "backyard" until 1928, when they were moved out to Jay Creek.

Mona Minahan, Alice Springs' first barmaid, began work at the Stuart Arms in 1931.

The pub was destroyed by fire in 1960, and later replaced by a two-storey building, also known as the Stuart Arms. This building was demolished over the weekend of 11–12 January 1986, so that a shopping centre, Alice Plaza, could be built on the site. A new pub of the same name was established in the shopping centre.

== Gallery ==
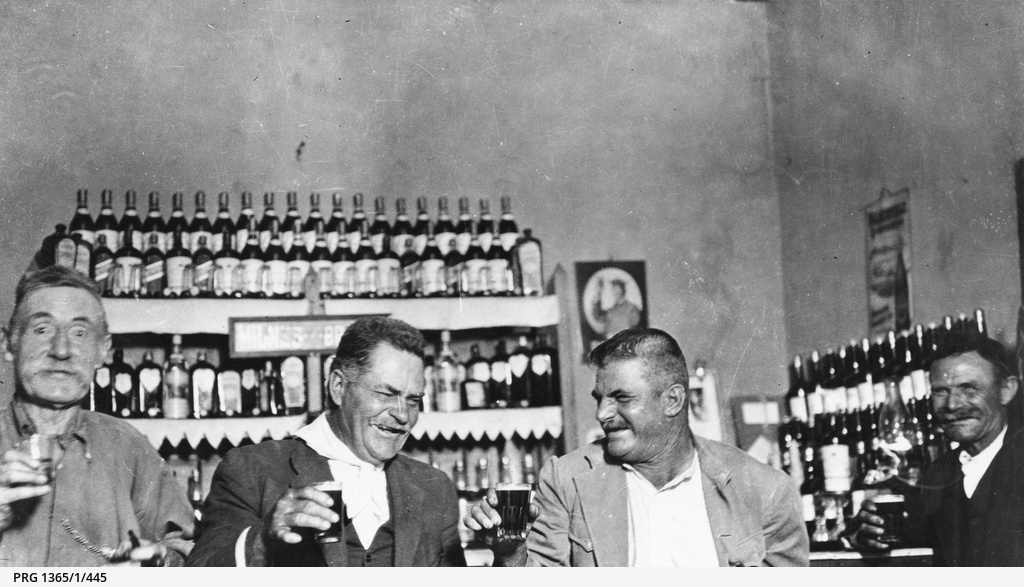
Men in front of the Stuart Arms Hotel bar in 1921

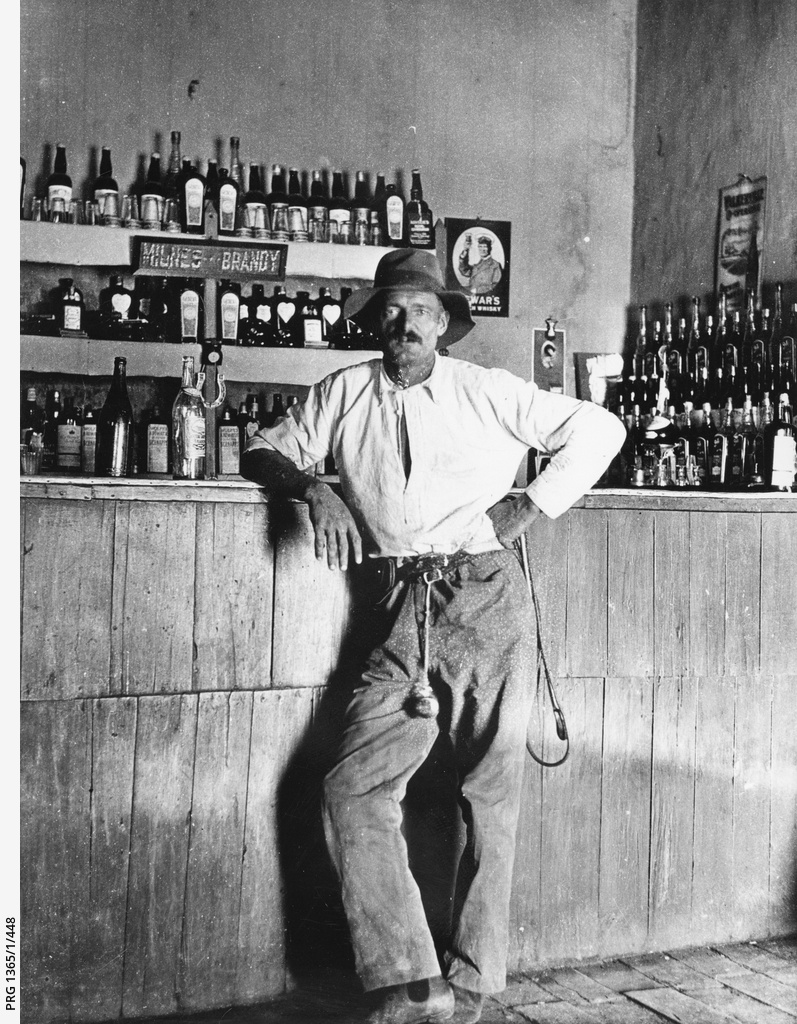
Peter O'Grady in the Stuart Arms Hotel bar in 1921

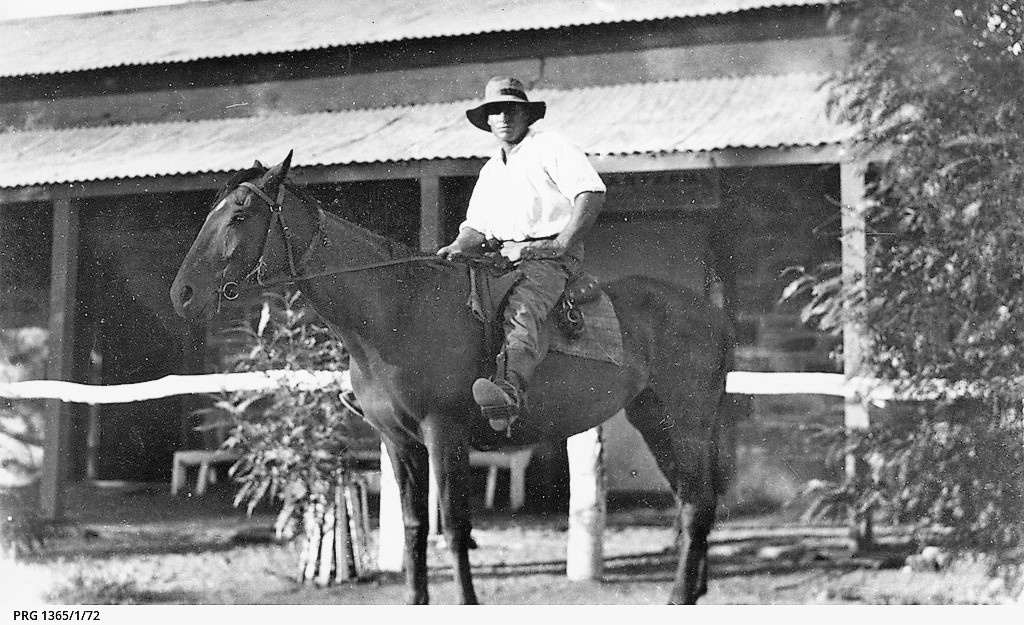
Bob Purvis Sr of Woodgreen Station outside Stuart Arms in 1922

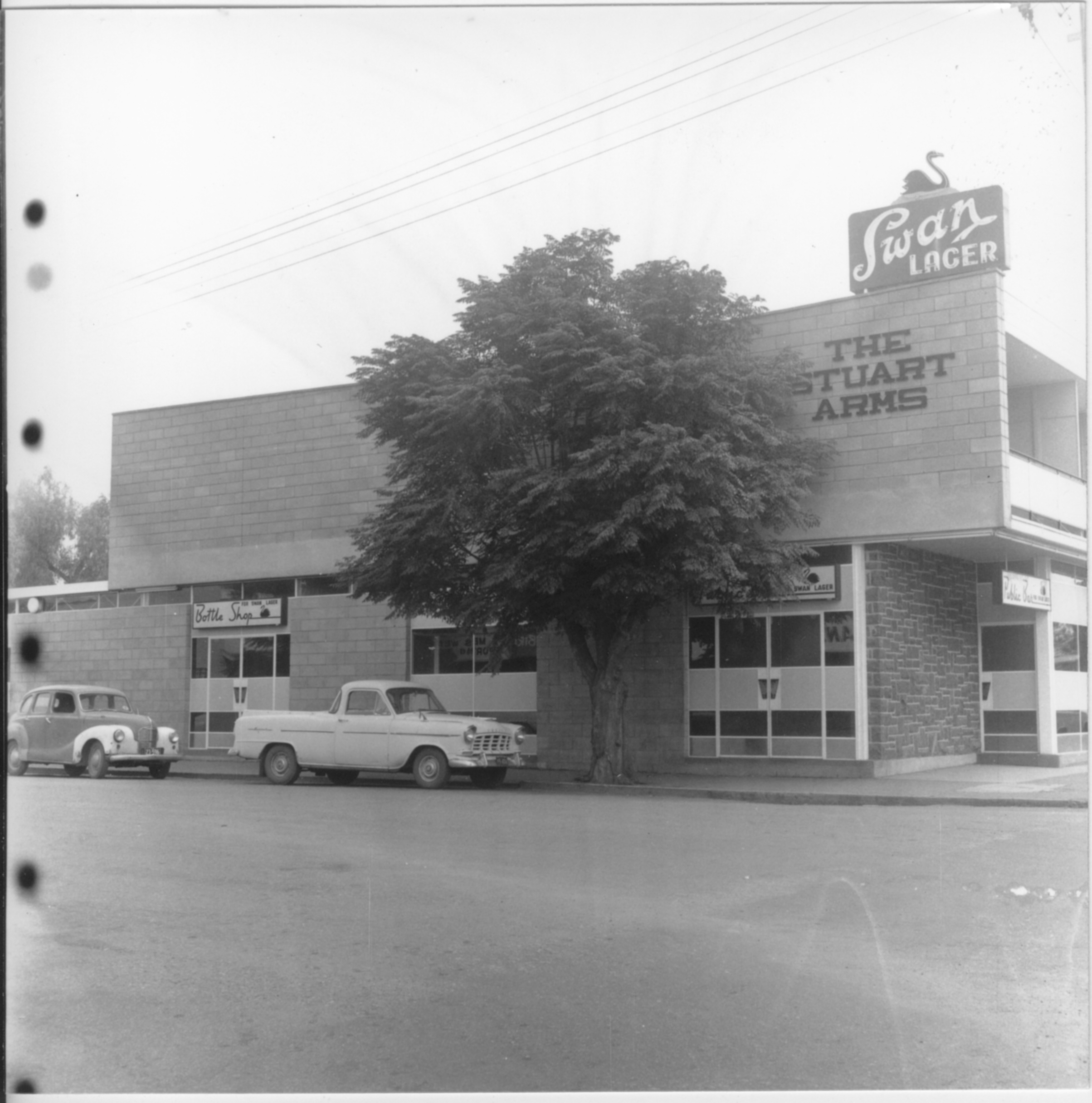
The Stuart Arms following being rebuilt, photo likely taken in the 1960s
