= Boorong =

Burramattagal cross-cultural pioneer

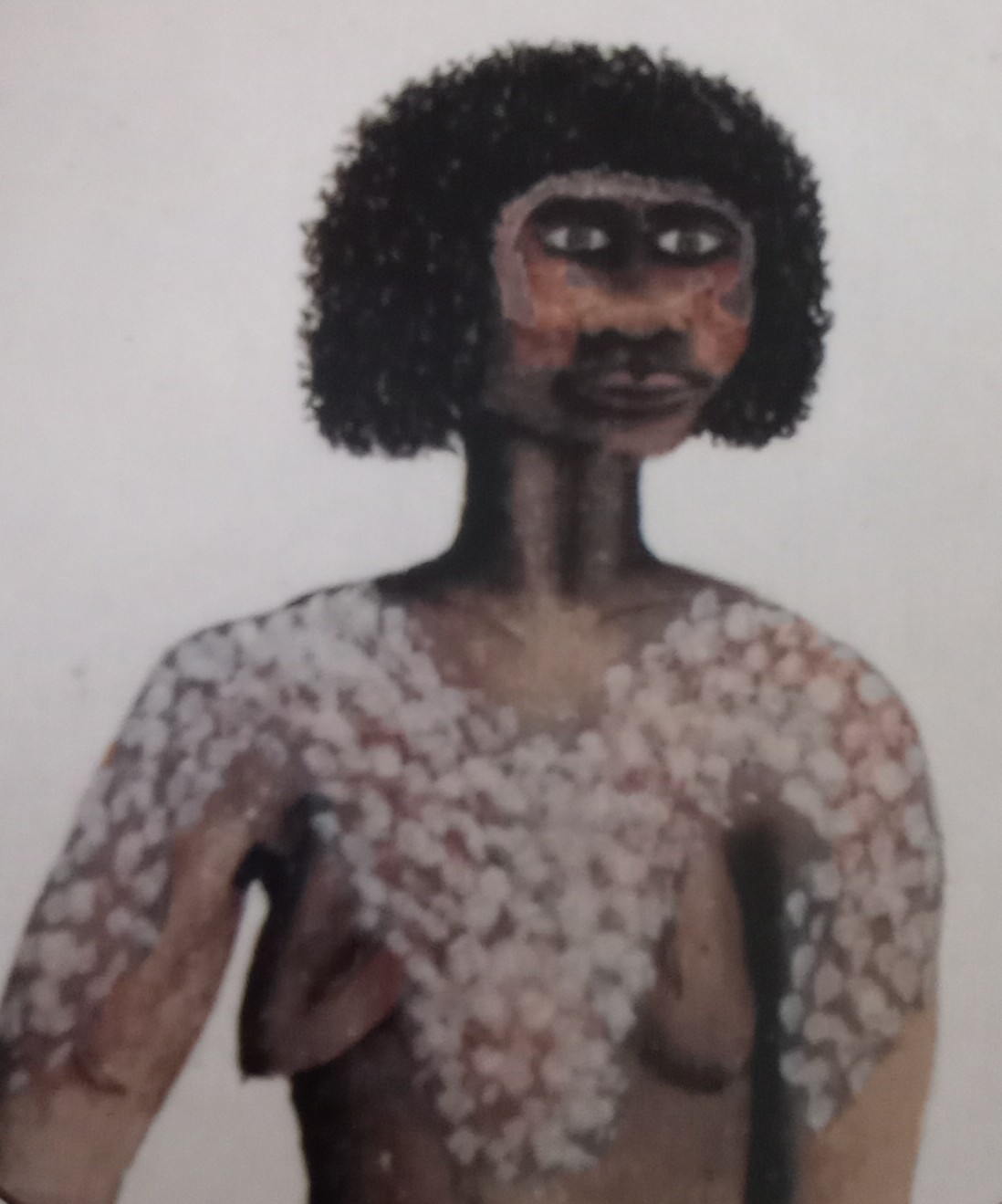
Boorong

Boorong (c.1777 – c.1813), also known as Booron or Abaroo, was a Burramattagal woman who was the first female Indigenous Australian to establish significant relations with the British colonists of Australia. She was also the first Indigenous Australian to be instructed in Christianity. As a child, she learnt English and became an important interpreter between the Eora people of Port Jackson and the British in the early years of colonisation. In adulthood, Boorong was the third wife of Bennelong and is buried with him near Kissing Point, New South Wales.

== Early life ==
Boorong was born into the Burramattagal clan of the Eora people whose country was located around what is now known as Parramatta. Her father was Maugoran and her mother Gooroobera. She had two brothers; Ballooderry and Yeranibi. Her father later married another woman named Tadyera and they had two children; Bidgee Bidgee and Warreweer Wogul Mi, these being Boorong's half-brother and half-sister. Boorong's name was derived from the word meaning "star".

== British invasion and forced exile ==
Boorong's family were exiled from their land when Governor Arthur Phillip ordered a military post be established at Rose Hill in late 1788. A detachment of Royal Marines under Lieutenant George Johnston occupied Rose Hill on 2 November 1788 and built an earthwork fort in what is now Parramatta Park.

Boorong and her family were forced to migrate into Wallumedegal country around what is now Ryde, eight kilometres downstream along the Parramatta River. Her father later 'expressed great dissatisfaction at the number of white men who had settled in their former territories'. Phillip reported that 'the natives were very angry at so many people being sent to Rose Hill, certain it is that wherever our colonists fix themselves, the natives are obliged to leave that part of the country'. Phillip reacted to Maugoran's protest by reinforcing the troops at Rose Hill.

== Smallpox and adoption by the British ==
In April 1789, a smallpox epidemic ripped through the Aboriginal population around the British outpost at Port Jackson. Around half of the local Indigenous population perished. A few of those suffering from the disease were brought into the convict settlement at Sydney Cove. One of these was Boorong, who was around 12 years old at the time. She was cared for by the colony's surgeon Dr John White and a captured Cammeraygal man named Arabanoo. Although Arabanoo later died of smallpox, Boorong survived and was placed in the care of the settlement's chaplain Reverend Richard Johnson and his wife Mary.

Another Indigenous smallpox survivor, a boy named Nanbaree, had also been obtained by the British at the colony. Boorong and Nanbaree were taught English and were soon used to help the British communicate with the surviving Eora people living around the harbour. When the British abducted Bennelong and Colebe from Manly Cove and brought them to the settlement, Boorong and Nanbaree assisted in interpreting for them.

In 1790, British officers used Boorong to try and convince Bennelong's wife, Barangaroo, to come and live at the settlement. However, Barangaroo ended up convincing Boorong to leave the colony to reside with her relatives. She returned to the British after only a few weeks when she was chastised by her family for not accepting Yemmerrawanne as a partner.

While living with Reverend Johnson, Boorong was taught the Lord’s Prayer and was introduced to the Bible as both a text for lessons in English and for religious instruction. She was the first documented Indigenous Australian to become familiarised with Christian ideology.

By 1791, Boorong, along with Nanbaree, had acquired enough proficiency in bilingual skills to open new lines of communication with the local Eora people. As a result, increasing numbers of Aboriginal people came into the British settlement to interact.

== Marriage to Bennelong and later life ==
Boorong though ultimately rejected the British way of life and was not converted to Christianity. She returned to a semi-traditional way of life with other surviving Eora people. By 1797, she had married Bennelong, becoming his third wife after Barangaroo had died a few years previously. Boorong and Bennelong lived together with a group of around 100 Eora survivors known as the "Kissing Point tribe" on the north side of the Parramatta River, near what is now known as the suburb of Putney.

Around 1803 they had a son, called Dickey, who was baptized and given the English name of Thomas Walter Coke by the Reverend William Walker. Dickey was briefly married to an Aboriginal girl named Maria Lock, but they had no children.

Boorong died sometime around 1813 when her husband Bennelong died. She is buried alongside Bennelong and Nanbaree in a grave which is located under a residential housing lot at 25 Watson Street, Putney. The Government of New South Wales purchased the property in 2018 with the aim of developing it into a place of commemoration.

== See also ==
- List of Indigenous Australian historical figures
