= Daniel Moowattin =

- Born: c. 1791; Parramatta, Australia
- Died: 1 November 1816 (aged 24–25); Sydney, Australia
- Cause of death: Execution by hanging
- Other names: Mow-watty, Mowwatting, Moowatting, Moowattye

Daniel Moowattin (c. 1791 – 1 November 1816) was an Aboriginal Australian Burramattagal man from the Parramatta area in New South Wales. He is noted for his work as a guide and assistant to the botanical collector George Caley, and as the third Aboriginal person known to have visited England. There are a number of other spellings of his name, including Mow-watty, Mowwatting, Moowatting and Moowattye.

Moowattin was later convicted of raping a 15-year-old girl and became the first Aboriginal person to be legally executed in colonial Australia.

== Early life ==
Born in the Parramatta area around 1791, Moowattin was a member of the Darug tribe. His name, Moowattin (Mow-watty, Moowattye or Mowwatting), means "bush path". He was adopted as an infant by Richard Partridge, the government flogger and executioner.

== Career ==
By 1805 he became a guide and helper for the botanical collector George Caley who collected plant specimens for Joseph Banks in the Colony of New South Wales from 1800 to 1810. Many of those specimens have the annotation in Caley's hand "got by Dan".

The placenames "Moowattin Creek" and "Cataract of Carrunggurring" appear on colonial maps. Caley records that while searching for a koala in 1807, Moowattin "heard a noise like the surf" and found a large waterfall flowing into the river.

=== London ===
When it was time for Caley to return home in 1810 he wrote to Joseph Banks seeking permission to bring Moowattin with him. They sailed to England on HMS Hindostan in 1810.

Moowattin was the third Aboriginal Australian person to visit England. Bennelong and Yemmerrawanne had visited England 18 years earlier in 1792. He enjoyed his time there but longed to come back home, saying "I am anxious to return to my own country, I find more pleasure under a gum tree sitting with my tribe than I do here." In his homesickness he seemed to have picked up a liking for alcohol.

His pronunciation of the English language was generally admired; his apparel, which was also provided by the benevolent Baronet ... was directed to be of good quality, to which the taylor did not forget to add the very pink of fashion, so that Mr Moowattye was to all intents and purposes a black beau.

— The Sydney Gazette and New South Wales Advertiser, 23 May 1812

In 1811 Moowattin attended a London party where an English woman sang "No, my love, no". He responded by singing an Aboriginal song. An eyewitness reported: "He sat with strongly marked expressions of attention and delight, and, when asked to sing, consented with a smile. His articulation seemed indistinct, the sounds having great similarity to each other, as, rah-rah tah, wha-rah rah, bahhah tab-rah hah. The tune was occasionally changed; the ditty was divided into three parts or verses: the latter was particularly hurried and exulting. On being requested to put the song into English, he replied, "not well to do; but first we take fish, next take kangaroo, then take wife."

Moowattin returned to the Colony of New South Wales on Mary of London in May 1812. He spent his time in the bush with his tribe and working as a farm labourer around Parramatta.

== Rape conviction and execution ==
In 1816 Moowattin was charged with the rape of a 15-year-old girl, Hannah Russell, the daughter of a settler in the Parramatta area. Russell testified that, on 6 August 1816, Moowattin had accosted her on a public road near Parramatta, then "seized her rudely by the neck, and dragged her into the wood, where he beat her head against a tree, and beat and bruised her all over". According to her statement, after raping her he demanded some paper money and coins in exchange for her freedom, but then pursued her again and "beat her violently against the stump of a tree". He was then frightened off by John Shee, one of John Macarthur's stockmen. Shee testified that he had known Moowattin for nearly a year and that he had been employed as a labourer by a Mr. Bellamy since the start of August. James Oldgate, a constable, testified that he had gone with Moowattin to Mr. Bellamy's farm and recovered some of the stolen money which Moowattin had buried.

Moowattin had an attorney appointed on his behalf and "rested his defence on a palpable denial of any knowledge of the transaction". On 28 September 1816, he was convicted of rape and robbery and sentenced to death. He was executed by hanging on 1 November 1816. Moowattin was the first Aboriginal person in the colony of New South Wales to be convicted and executed of a crime in the Court of Criminal Jurisdiction. He was also the first to be tried by a superior court in New South Wales.

Keith Vincent Smith writes "It was 10 years since he had climbed an ironbark tree at North Rocks to gather gum leaves and five years since he last walked through the streets of London and visited Kew Gardens with George Caley. He had been convicted and sentenced largely on the opinion of Gregory Blaxland and the Reverend Samuel Marsden, who testified that he knew the difference between good and evil. He was the first Aboriginal person to be officially hanged in Australia."
