= Destiny in Sydney =

Novel by D. Manning Richards

- Front Cover
- Author: D. Manning Richards
- Language: English
- Series: 3-books series about Sydney, Australia
- Genre: Family saga historical novel
- Published: July 1, 2012 Aries Books
- Publication place: United States
- Media type: Print and ebook
- Pages: 492 pp
- ISBN: 978-0-9845410-0-3

Destiny in Sydney: An epic novel of convicts, Aborigines, and Chinese embroiled in the birth of Sydney, Australia is the first historical novel in a three-book series about Sydney, Australia by American writer D. Manning Richards. It was published in 2012 and was followed by the second serial book, Gift of Sydney, in 2014. Destiny in Sydney begins in 1787 in Scotland and ends in 1902, covering 126 years of Australian history. The family saga story follows three fictional families: Scots-Irish, Aboriginal, and Chinese, who interact with real-life historical figures to dramatize the major events and conflicts in Australian history. Richards writes “The history is largely accurate . . . based on recorded history . . . from well over two hundred sources.” The appendix lists ninety primary references and includes a discussion of “Fact or Fiction?” by chapter that tries to anticipate readers’ questions.

== Origin and inspiration ==
Author D. Manning Richards lived and worked in Sydney, Australia for three years (1973–75) during a period of unprecedented reforms by Prime Minister Gough Whitlam, which included returning title ownership to part of the Gurindji indigenous people's ancestral lands, removing the last vestiges of the White Australia policy, and establishing relations with China. Destiny in Sydney was inspired by the author’s desire to understand the history of Australia, especially its European birthplace, Sydney, and its gradual contentious movement toward multiculturalism. His curiosity led to years of researching the history of Australia, including reading nine of the twelve personal journals of the First Fleet, which placed the first convicts in Australia in 1788.

== Plot summary ==
In 1787, Scottish marine Lieutenant Nathaniel Armstrong is in charge of convicts on one of the eleven ships sent in the First Fleet to voyage from England to the other side of the world to establish a British penal colony. He lusts after fiery Irish convict Moira O’Keeffe and surprises himself when he falls in love with her. Together, they nearly starve in Sydney Cove while learning to farm the harsh land and deal with the Aborigines, who suffer from the Europeans' diseases and unequal warfare.

Armstrong descendants deny their convict heritage and oppose the Chinese who come for the gold rush. Three Fong brothers suffer violence and despair as they fight to forge a place for themselves. Duncan Armstrong, rich and powerful, helps pass the White Australia Policy in 1901 that greatly restricts Chinese immigration and encourages Chinese Australians to leave, while his cousin Eleanor works for women’s suffrage and a “fair go” for Aboriginal Australians.

== Major themes ==
Destiny in Sydney is a multigenerational historical novel, and, therefore, because it encompasses 126 years of family sagas and both Sydney and national history, the story has multiple themes: hardships of settlement and development, historical drama-action-adventure, mistreatment of convicts, (as well as Indigenous Australians and Chinese), forming a democratic European government, and the effects of the White Australia policy.

== Reception ==
Destiny in Sydney has received many positive reviews. Midwest Book Review is typical in recommending the epic historical novel for “telling the story of individuals finding love where they least expect it, coping with their troubled convict heritage, the plagues of racism, and struggles with the indigenous people who truly own the continent."

== Main historical figures ==
The novel is unusual in the way it weaves real-life historical figures and fictional characters into the narrative of actual historical events that tell the story of Sydney and Australia, including the effects of European racism against the indigenous people and Chinese immigrants. The story is often told through the words and thoughts of the first five governors of New South Wales: Arthur Phillip, John Hunter, Philip Gidley King, William Bligh, and Lachlan Macquarie. A particularly interesting incident, the Rum Rebellion in 1808 dramatizes the overthrow of the government of Governor William Bligh (the Captain Bligh of the Mutiny on the Bounty). An extraordinary personality, John Macarthur, the "Father of Australian Wool," was behind the coup of Bligh and was an antagonist of all five of the early governors. His remarkable wife Elizabeth Macarthur also is important to the storyline.

The principal Aboriginal historical figures Arabanoo, Bennelong, Pemulwuy, and Colebee were all real people as were the secondary Indigenous Australians: Nanbaree, Booroong, Yemmerrawanne, Gooroobaroobooloo, Tedbury, and Bungaree. Nearly all of the events in the novel involving these notable Aborigines are based on incidents described in the journals of the time and historical narratives.

The life of the fictional Chinese elder Ts’ing Kwong-tang borrows from the remarkable life of the popular Sydney leader Mei Quong Tart.

== Main fictional characters ==
- Nathaniel Armstrong - The central character who begins the Armstrong family line as a Scottish marine lieutenant but becomes a rich landowner and diplomatic advisor to governors.
- Moira O’Keeffe - Irish convict who is Nathaniel’s housekeeper and then wife, who grows into a woman of self-assurance, elegance, and community service.
- Arthur Armstrong - Meek son, Royal Botanic Gardens botanist, who travels with naturalist Charles Darwin to the Outback.
- Charles Armstrong - Difficult, hard-drinking son, becomes rich sea captain.
- Duncan Armstrong - Charles’s son, gold mining wealth leads to high positions in Parliament.
- Eleanor Armstrong - Arthur’s daughter, real estate developer, suffragette, and supporter of Aboriginal causes.
- Fong Sing-woo - Eldest brother responsible for brothers’ gold mining efforts, religious instruction, and family cohesion.
- Fong Ho-teng - Fun loving but lazy brother, who becomes a disillusioned opium drug addict.
- Fong Min-chin - Naive youngest brother who goes on to build Fong family line in Australia.

== See also ==
- History of Australia
- History of Indigenous Australians
- Stolen Generations
- Journals of the First Fleet
- The Fatal Shore
- The Commonwealth of Thieves
- History of Chinese Australians
