= Nanbaree =

Notable Gadigal interpreter and sailor

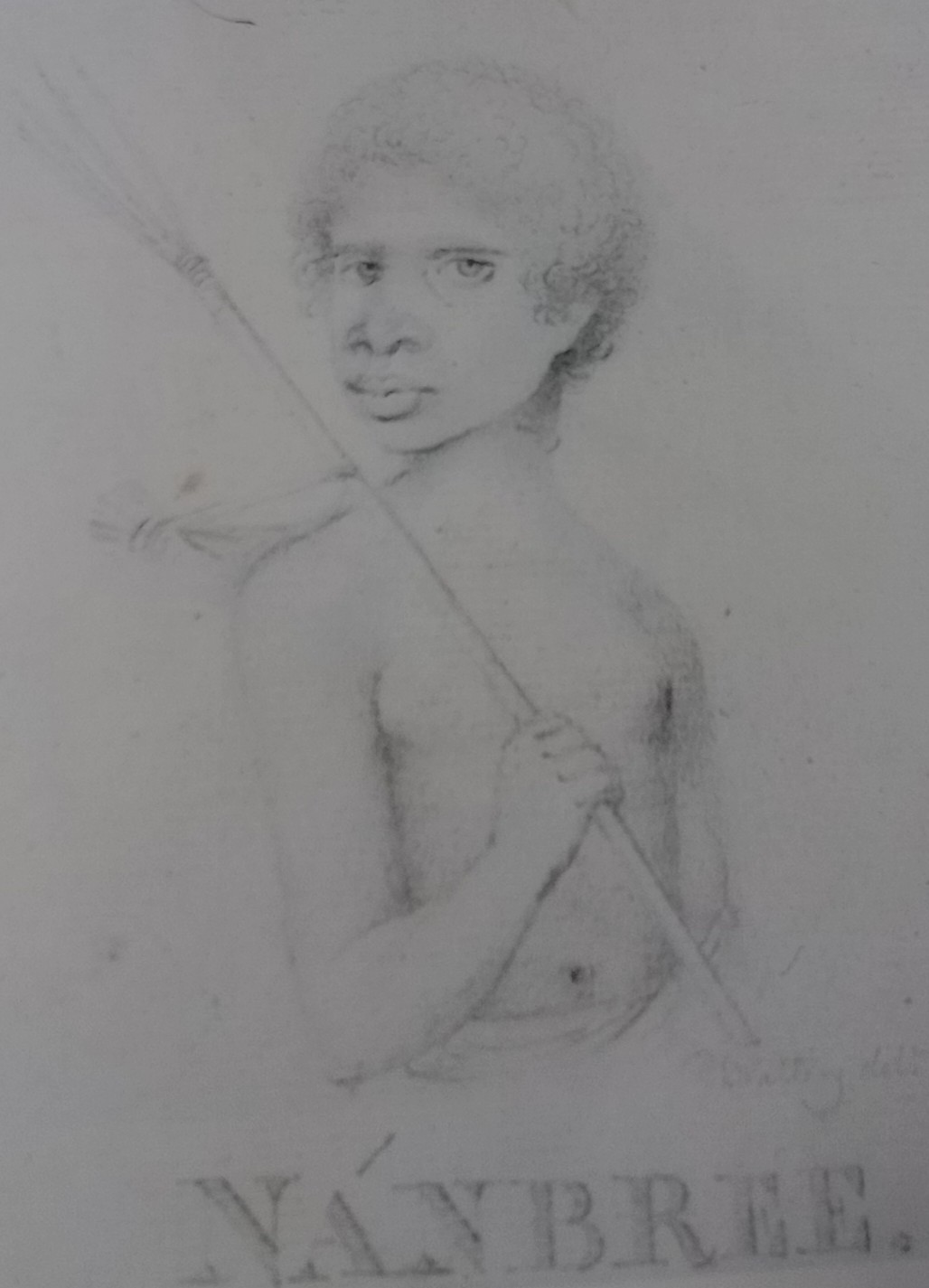
Portrait of Nanbaree by Thomas Watling

Nanbaree (c.1782 – 12 August 1821), also named Nanbarry and Andrew Snape Hamond Douglass White, was an Aboriginal Australian of the Gadigal clan who undertook a prominent role in establishing communication between the Aboriginal people and the colonists during the early stages of British occupation of the Sydney area. While still a child, he was the first Aboriginal Australian to acquire a functional level of English and became an important interpreter as he had very close kinship ties with prominent figures such as Bennelong and Colebe. During adulthood, he became a notable sailor, voyaging with Matthew Flinders.

== Early life ==
Nanbaree was born around 1782 into the Gadigal clan of the Dharug people who spoke the Eora language in what is now the Sydney region.

=== Arrival of the British and smallpox ===
In 1788, Nanbaree witnessed the arrival of Arthur Phillip in Sydney Harbour with the First Fleet to establish a penal colony consisting of British military personnel and transported convicts.

In April 1789, a major smallpox epidemic broke out amongst the Dharug people living around the harbour, killing approximately half of the population. Phillip with the colony's surgeon, John White and a captured Dharug man named Arabanoo, went to look for survivors. They found a boy around 7 years of age and his father lying sick on a beach covered in smallpox lesions. Nearby were the dead bodies of the boy's mother and baby sister. The boy and his father were taken back to the British settlement where they were cared for by White and Arabanoo in a hut next to the field hospital. The boy's name was Nanbaree. His father soon died, as did Arabanoo, but Nanbaree recovered and was taken to live with White and his servant.

== Living with the British ==
White helped teach Nanbaree English and gave Nanbaree the British name of Andrew Snape Hamond Douglass White, after Sir Andrew Hamond, whom he had served under previous to being assigned to the First Fleet. Soon after Nanbaree's arrival at the British settlement, another young smallpox survivor, a twelve-year-old girl named Boorong, was brought in. She was taken into the household of the colony's chaplain Richard Johnson and developed a close friendship with Nanbaree. A couple of months later they were further joined by Nanbaree's uncle Colebe and by Bennelong, who were both forcibly abducted by the British, but they managed to escape after several months. Nanbaree also tried to escape when he was taken by boat to be shown to his surviving relatives, but was restrained from swimming to them.

=== Interpreter for the colonists ===
By 1790, Nanbaree had become accustomed to living with the British and became quite good at speaking English. He was utilised as an interpreter by the colonists to communicate with his kinspeople. Despite his young age, he acted as an important interlocutor when a group of officers encountered Bennelong and Colebe at Manly, a situation that later developed into the incident where Phillip was speared and wounded by the warrior Willemering. Despite this violence, further interactions between Bennelong and the British, translated by Nanbaree and Boorong, saw a thawing of relations resulting in more Aboriginal people visiting the British settlement.

Nanbaree's language skills and position within the colony also became useful in warning his people about military operations that were planned against them. On one occasion he informed Ballooderry that soldiers were looking for him and on another he told Colebe that a punitive expedition had been ordered by the governor against the warrior Pemulwuy.

=== White's household ===
Nanbaree continued to live with White, whose household was expanding. White took on a convict mistress named Rachel Turner, who had arrived with the Second Fleet in 1790. The couple had a baby in 1793. White was also assigned a convict artist named Thomas Watling, who became friends with Nanbaree and drew portraits of him and other Dharug people; the portraits later became part of the Watling Collection. In 1794, White returned to England, leaving Nanbaree in Sydney without a patron.

== Adulthood ==
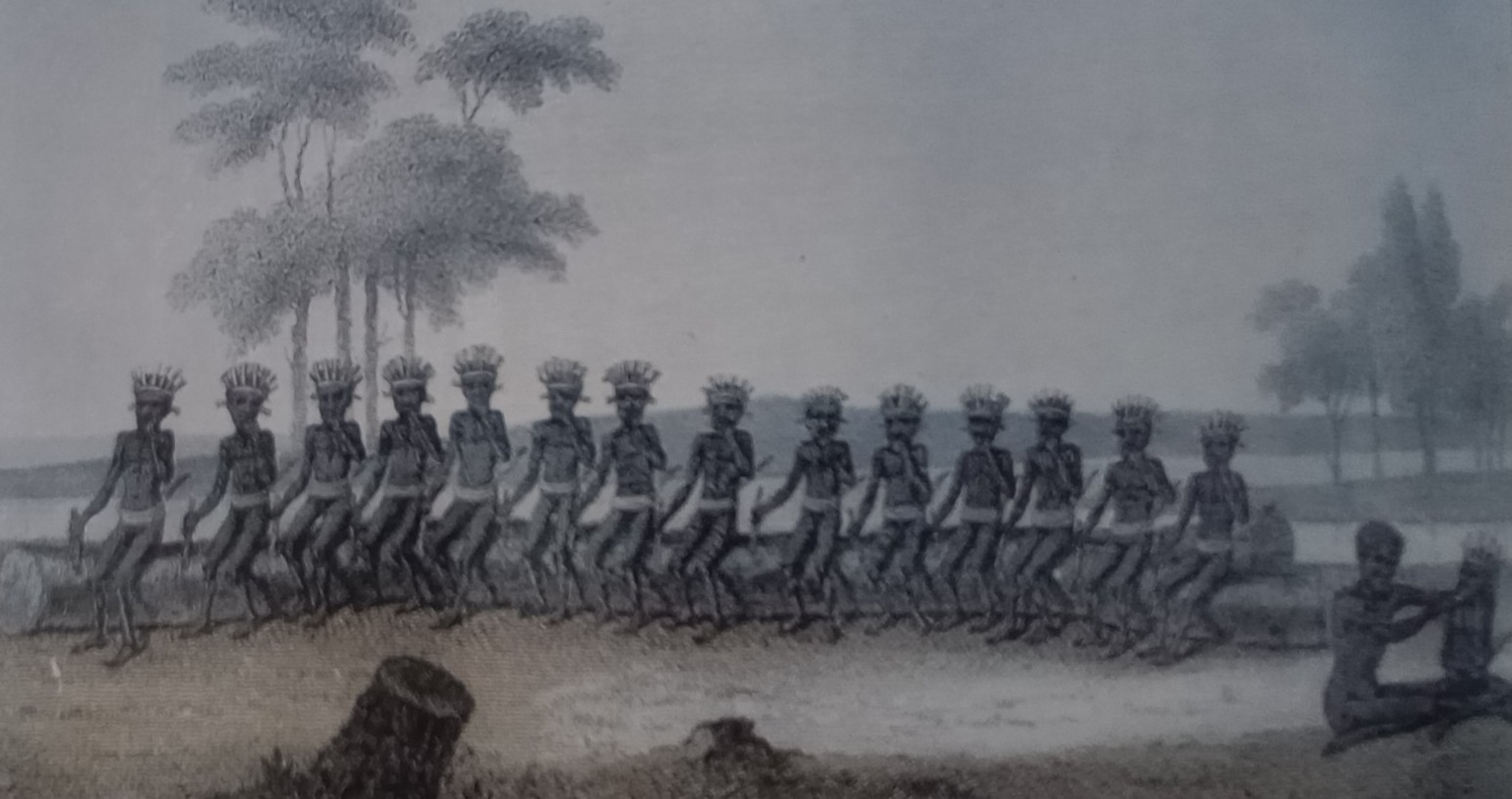
Nanbaree and others participating in an Aboriginal initiation ceremony near Sydney in 1795

With White gone, Nanbaree became somewhat more aligned with his Aboriginal relatives. In January 1795, he underwent an initiation ceremony called yoolang erah-badiang with several other boys at Farm Cove. The British were allowed to observe and document the event, in which Nanbaree and the other initiates had one of their upper incisor teeth ritually evulsed. In a break from tradition, Nanbaree's extracted tooth was given to the Judge Advocate, David Collins.

As the British colony expanded throughout the greater Sydney area, Aboriginal life became increasingly fractured. Factional feuds between Nanbaree's kin and the remnants of other clans escalated in 1797 when Nanbaree's uncle, Colebe, killed a young rival named Yeranibee and his wife. This set off a series of reprisals aimed at Colebe and his relatives. Nanbaree and Colebe were able to utilise their favourable connections with the British, and were protected by soldiers when their lives were at risk from being speared.

=== Sailor ===
Nanbaree's links with the British also facilitated his employment as a sailor on HMS Reliance under the command of Captain Henry Waterhouse. In 1799, he sailed with another Aboriginal mariner named Bondel on Reliance to Norfolk Island. In 1802, Nanbaree was assigned to the crew of HMS Investigator under the command of Captain Matthew Flinders, who was tasked with circumnavigating the Australian continent. The Aboriginal sailor Bungaree also joined this expedition. Nanbaree sailed north on Investigator, but at the Whitsunday Islands he returned to Sydney on board the damaged HMS Lady Nelson after becoming homesick.

== Later life and death ==
In the 1800s, Nanbaree increasingly associated himself with Bennelong and the remnant people of various clans that grouped themselves with him. They resided mostly on the northern banks of the Parramatta River at a place called Kissing Point. Bennelong and Nanbaree were well acquainted with naval officers who had been granted land there, such as Henry Waterhouse and William Kent. However, over time they became most closely associated with the convict land-holder, James Squire who established Australia's first brewery near Kissing Point. Squire let Bennelong, Nanbaree and the other members of the group live a relatively free lifestyle on his property. Boorong, who grew up with Nanbaree in their adoptive childhood, also resided with them as Bennelong's wife.

Bennelong and Boorong died in 1813, with Squire giving them a formal burial and grave on the Kissing Point property. Nanbaree died in August 1821 and previously had asked that Squire bury him alongside Bennelong and Boorong, a request which the brewer fulfilled. It is probable that Nanbaree was injured in a ritual fight in the days before his death and at that time he had a wife and daughter.

The location of the grave of Bennelong, Boorong and Nanbaree was lost until rediscovered in 2011 as being under a residential property at 25 Watson Street in the riverside suburb of Putney. The Government of New South Wales purchased the property in 2018 with the aim of developing it into a place of commemoration.

== See also ==
- List of Indigenous Australian historical figures
