= Colebe =

Eighteenth-century Aboriginal Australian

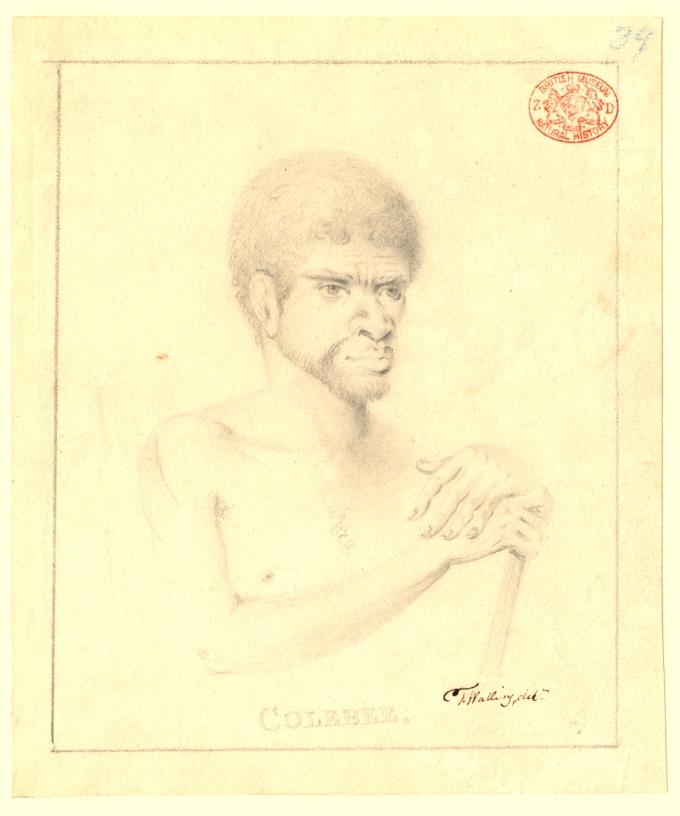
- Born: c. 1754; Australia
- Died: After 1806; Australia
- Spouse(s): Daringa (died 1795); Boorea (fl. 1790–1806); Kurubarabulu (fl. 1775–1805)

Gringerry Kibba Colebee (c. 1754 – after 1806), also spelt Colebe, Coleby or Colbee, was an eighteenth-century Gadigal man, an Aboriginal Australian people from present-day Sydney.

After his abduction by British forces and eventual escape, Colebee became a prominent Aboriginal figure during the colonial period as an intermediary between British colonists and the Eora. He is not to be confused with his namesake and brother-in-law Botany Bay Colebee of the Gweagal people.

== Pre-colonial era ==
Colebee's age was estimated in 1789 to be 35, giving him an approximate birth year of 1754. According to the Eora, he was a senior member of his people – more distinguished than fellow Aboriginal man Woollarawarre Bennelong, who was deferential to him. Historian Keith Vincent Smith describes Colebee as "chief" of the Gadigal.

His face was described as being heavily scarred by smallpox. The Eora had endured a smallpox epidemic in April 1789. It is likely that Colebee's totem was the white-bellied sea eagle.

According to convict Thomas Watling, Colebee was a common Aboriginal name in the Sydney area.

== Abduction and escape ==
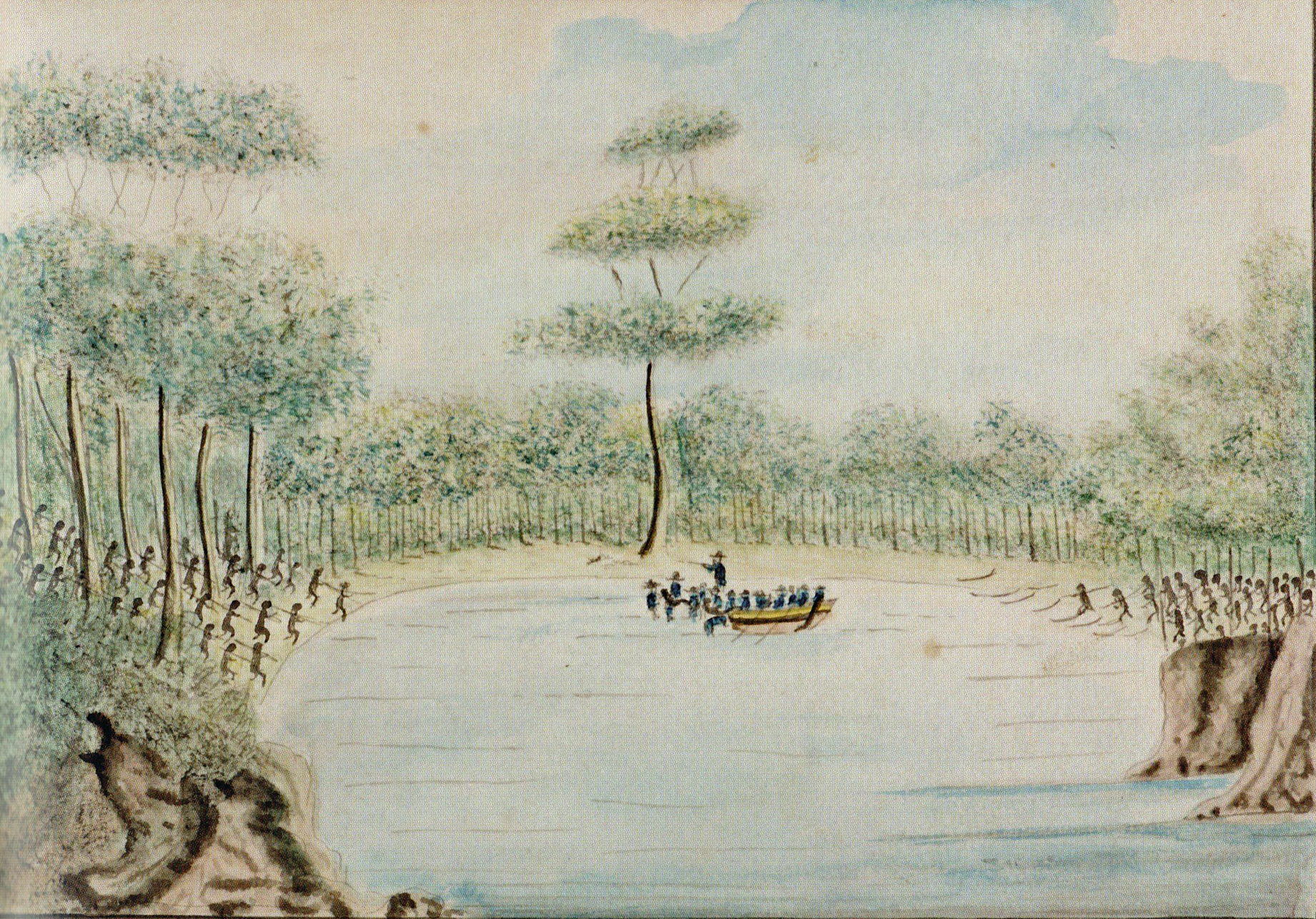
Depiction of Colebee and Bennelong's abduction by William Bradley

On 25 November 1789, Colebee and Bennelong were abducted from Manly Cove by Lt. William Bradley, on the orders of Governor Arthur Phillip, who wanted to use the two men to understand Aboriginal society and customs.

The two men were shackled in a guarded hut by the Governor's house. Colebee escaped after three weeks of captivity, on the night of 12 December 1789, by severing the rope connected to his leg irons. Bennelong escaped in early 1790.

== Relationship with European settlers ==
Colebee was present at the spearing of Governor Philip on 7 September 1790.

For some time, Colebee and Bennelong refused invitations to meet with the European settlers, but eventually in September they brought their families to the settlers' town. Other Aboriginal people followed in their example. On 18 October, Colebee met Phillip, probably at Farm Cove, to conclude a peace agreement and receive a metal hatchet.

Compared to the majority of Aboriginal people around Port Jackson, who avoided interaction with the European population, Colebee and Bennelong were the most prominent Sydney Aboriginal men of the era. Colebee is the subject of numerous sketches or drawings.

Colebee acted as a guide to the settlers, helping to recover fishing gear and leading a lost soldier back to the settlement. He occasionally dined at Government House, and became increasingly dependent on the British colonists. He lived at the settlement three or four days per week.

Despite an attempt, he failed to bring in Bidjigal warrior Pemulwuy, who had killed Governor Phillip's gamekeeper John McIntyre.

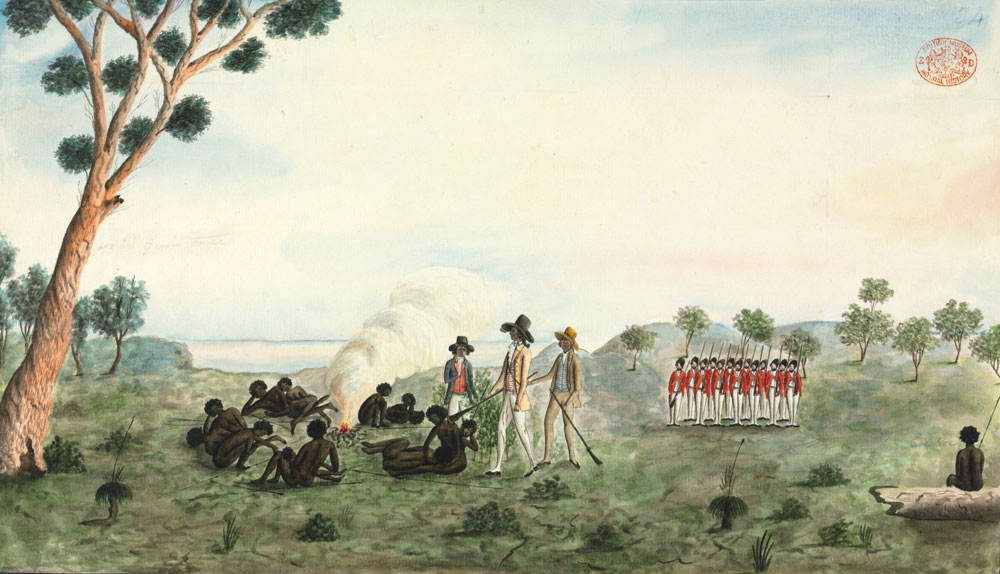
1790s watercolour; Colebee is depicted sitting on a log.

== Personal life ==
Colebee's first wife was a fisherwoman named Daringa, whose half-brother was Moorooboora, leader of the Murro-ore-dial (Pathway Place) clan.

Colebee and Daringa's daughter, Panieboolong, was born in December 1790. A few days after the birth, Colebee, his wife and baby spent a night at Governor Phillip's house. Despite special attention from influential colonial figure Elizabeth Macarthur, Panieboolong died at the age of about five months. In 1795, Daringa gave birth to another child and died a few months later. Colebee buried his still-living baby with his wife's body, apparently in the concern that the baby would starve.

His second wife, Boorea (fl. 1790–1806), was "Colebee's favourite" according to David Collins. Colebee and Bennelong, once allies, fought over Bennelong's wife Kurubarabulu (c. 1774 – after 1805) in July 1805. She later became Colebee's third wife. Colebee exchanged names – a symbolic act of friendship – with Kurubarabulu's brother Wárungin Wángubile Kólbi (also known as Botany Bay Colebee). To differentiate the two men, Kólbi's people (the Gweagal) referred to Colebee as Cadi Colebee.

Colebee's violence towards women was well-known. In October 1790 he severely battered Boorong, Bennelong's third wife, and in May 1791 he attempted to abduct a girl from Government House. He killed Aboriginal man Yeranibe and his wife in 1797.

== Death ==
It is possible Colebee died in 1806, as records do not mention him after that year. He is said to have regularly engaged in ritual revenge battles, and he may have died in a "payback battle".

== See also ==
- List of Indigenous Australian historical figures
