= Burramattagal =

Indigenous Australian clan

Burramattagal people
- aka: Baramadagal, Boromedegal, Parramattagal
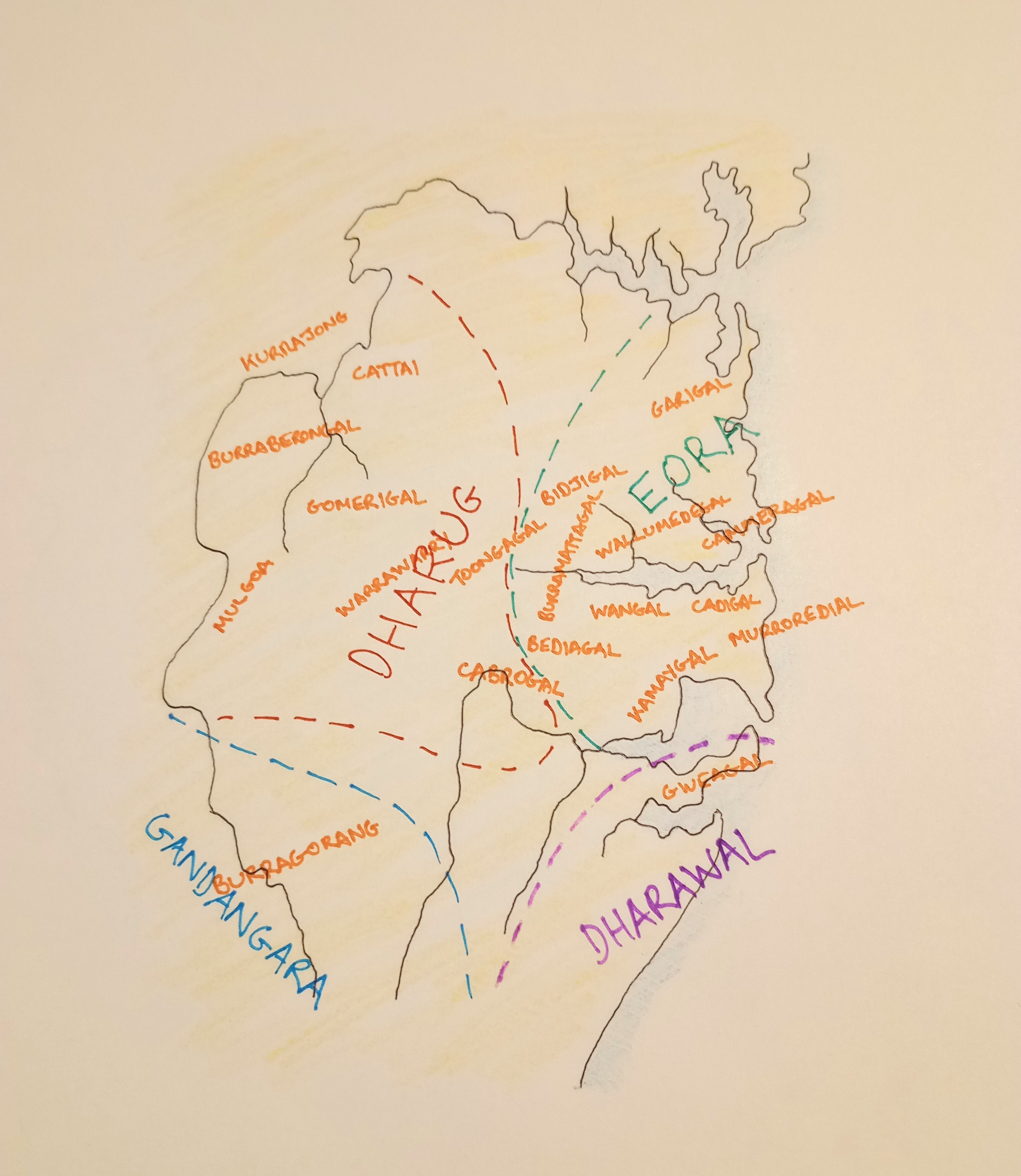
- The traditional lands of the Burramattagal people were located in the Sydney Basin

Hierarchy
- Language family: Pama–Nyungan
- Language branch: Yuin–Kuric
- Language group: Eora
- Group dialects: Dharug

Area
- Bioregion: Sydney Basin
- Location: Parramatta region west of Sydney, New South Wales, Australia
- Coordinates: 33°50′S 151°12′E
- Urban areas: Parramatta; Rosehill

Notable individuals
- Maugoran; Boorong; Baludarri; Daniel Moowattin; Bidgee Bidgee

The Burramattagal, also spelled as Baramadagal, Boromedegal and Parramattagal are one clan of the Darug people of Indigenous Australians. Their country before colonisation by the British was the area now known as Parramatta in the Sydney region. Their naming is derived from the Darug words for eel (burra), place (matta) and people (gal), ie., people of the place of eels.

== History ==
It is believed that the various clans of the Darug people, including the Burramattagal and their ancestors have been resident in the Sydney basin for up to 10,000 years.

=== British colonisation ===
The Burramattagal were rapidly dispossessed of their lands in November 1788 when Governor Arthur Phillip, decided that Parramatta and nearby Rose Hill were ideal locations to establish a military outpost and a farm. The Burramattagal clan at that time consisted mostly of a kinship group headed by an elder named Maugoran. Maugoran and others, including his son Baludarri and young daughter Boorong, were forcibly displaced by the arriving British forces into Wallumettagal country near what is now known as the Ryde region. Maugoran later complained to the colonists "at the number of white men who had settled in his former territories". Governor Phillip, however, dismissed the complaint by saying that "certain it is that wherever our colonists fix themselves, the natives are obliged to leave that part of the country". Phillip also reacted to Maugoran's protest by reinforcing the troops at Rose Hill.

== Notable people ==
Maugoran's daughter, Boorong, became an important interpreter between the British and the local Aboriginal people and later was the third wife of Bennelong.

Maugoran's son, Baludarri (also known as Ballooderry), later became closely associated with Governor Phillip, at times living at the Governor's residence at Parramatta. He also acted as a guide for the explorations of Watkin Tench. However, after Baludarri speared a convict in revenge for destroying his canoe, Phillip outlawed him, ordering that he be shot on sight. Baludarri escaped being shot, but died of illness in 1791 during his exile. He was buried in central Sydney, under what is now the site of the Museum of Sydney, with his funeral being organised by Bennelong.

== Legacy ==
The title of the city of Parramatta is derived from the Burramattagal's name for the area.

In 2008, a nature reserve in Parramatta was renamed the Baludarri Wetlands after the notable Burramattagal identity from the early colonial period.

== See also ==
- Eora
- Wangal
- Gadigal
- Darug
