= Bennelong =

Indigenous Australian cross-cultural pioneer

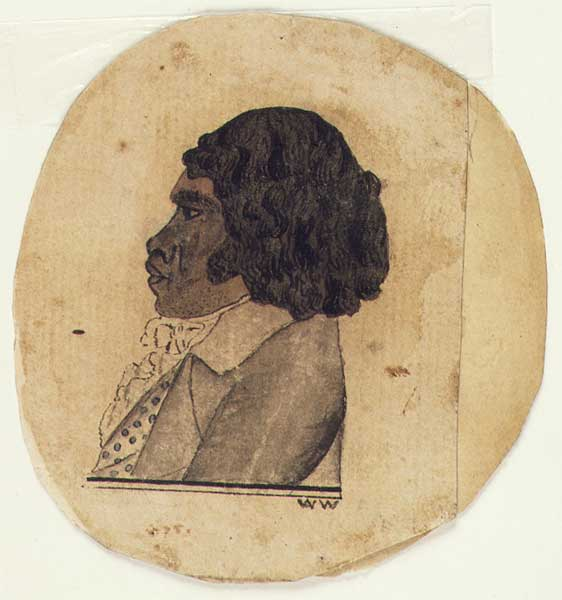
- Portrait (signed "W.W.") thought to depict Bennelong
- Born: c. 1764; South of the Parramatta River
- Died: 3 January 1813 (aged about 48); Kissing Point, Colony of New South Wales
- Spouse(s): 1. Unnamed first wife 2. Barangaroo; 3. Kurubarabulu; 4. Boorong
- Children: Dilboong; Thomas Walter Coke

Woollarawarre Bennelong (Note: Also spelt Baneelon) (c. 1764 – 3 January 1813) was a senior man of the Eora, an Aboriginal Australian people of the Port Jackson area, at the time of the first British settlement in Australia. Bennelong served as an interlocutor between the Eora and the British, both in the colony of New South Wales and in Great Britain. He was the first Aboriginal Australian to visit Europe and return.

In 1789, he was abducted on the authority of Governor Arthur Phillip, who hoped to use Bennelong to establish official dialogue with the Eora people. However, Bennelong escaped after several months. A tenuous relationship subsequently developed between Bennelong and the colonists, with various attacks and reconciliations occurring throughout their ensuing association with each other. Despite this friction, he came to be a significant ambassador of the Eora.

Bennelong was taken to Great Britain in 1792 and he resided in London for three years. Eventually his health deteriorated and in February 1795 he was returned to Australia. Back in his homeland, Bennelong was rejected from British colonial society and branded an alcoholic "savage" for vigorously maintaining his connection to a traditional lifestyle. He became a respected leader of the surviving remnants of the various local Indigenous clans in the Sydney region. He died at Kissing Point in 1813, aged about 48, and was buried in James Squire's orchard.

== Background ==
Woollarawarre Bennelong, the son of Goorah-Goorah and Gagolh, was born circa 1764 on the south shore of the Parramatta River. He was a member of the Wangal clan, connected with the south side of the Parramatta River, having close ties with the Wallumedegal clan, on the west side of the river, and the Burramattagal clan near today's Parramatta. He had several sisters, Wariwéar, Karangarang, Wûrrgan and Munânguri, who married important men from nearby clans, thereby creating political links for their brother. The island of Memel in Port Jackson was part of his personal property, inherited through his father.

He had five names, given at different times during the various ritual inductions he underwent. The other four are given as Wolarrebarre, Wogultrowe, Boinba, and Bundabunda. According to British officer Watkin Tench, Bennelong preferred to be called Woollarawarre.

== Capture and life in the British settlement ==
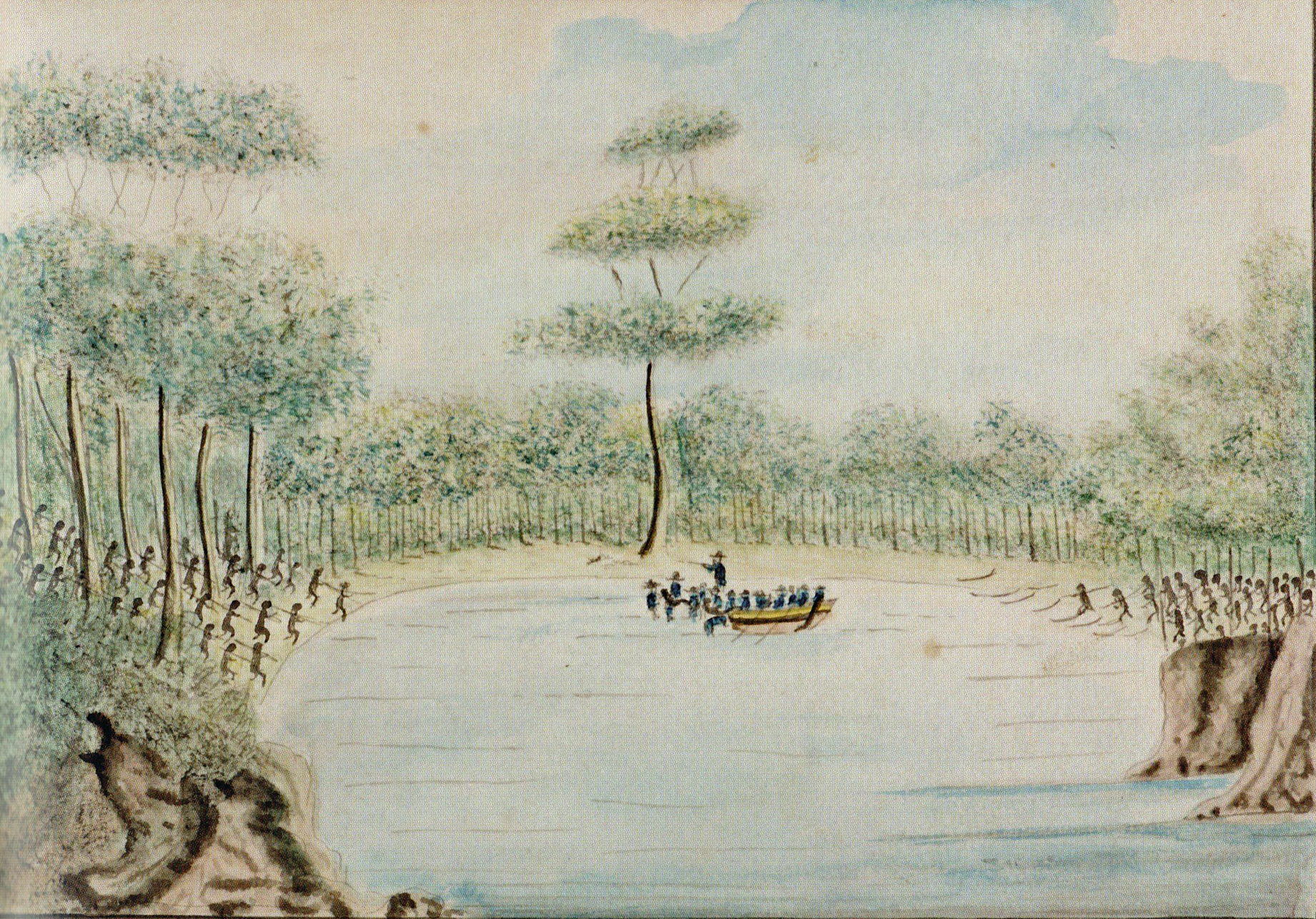
Taking of Colebee and Bennelong 25 November 1789 by William Bradley

Bennelong was brought to the settlement at Sydney Cove in November 1789 by order of the governor, Arthur Phillip, who was under instructions from King George III to establish relationships with the indigenous populations. At that time, the Eora conscientiously avoided contact with the newcomers, and in desperation Phillip resorted to kidnapping. A man named Arabanoo was captured, but like many other Aboriginal people near the settlement, he died in a smallpox epidemic a few months later in May 1789. Bennelong was captured with Colebee on 25 November 1789 as part of Phillip's plan to learn the language and customs of the local people. William Bradley painted a watercolour of the occasion and described the capture in his journal as the "most unpleasant service" he was ever ordered to undertake. At the time of his capture, Bennelong's age was estimated at 25, and he was described as being "of good stature, stoutly made", with a "bold, intrepid countenance". His appetite was such that "the ration of a week was insufficient to have kept him for a day", and "love and war seemed his favourite pursuits".

Colebee soon escaped, but Bennelong stayed in the settlement for several months, then slipped away. Four months later, he was sighted by officers in Manly Cove, and Phillip was notified. The governor hurried over and approached Bennelong, who was with a group of roughly 20 warriors. Phillip took a gesture by Bennelong towards another Aboriginal man, Willemering, as an invitation for an introduction, and extended his hand to the latter, who responded by spearing Phillip in the shoulder. A scuffle broke out, but the officers managed to assist the governor away to safety where the spear was removed and a full recovery followed.

Willemering was a kurdaitcha of the Kayimai clan from the area now known as Balgowlah. It has been suggested by some historians that he had been enlisted by Bennelong to carry out payback for the latter's sense of personal injury on having been kidnapped. In this view, some form of atonement was necessary as a prelude to any further arrangements with the colonists. Phillip ordered that no retaliation take place and Bennelong, some days later, turned up to visit him as he was recovering from the wound, and their relationship was renewed. In a gesture of kinship, Bennelong bestowed upon Phillip the Aboriginal name Wolawaree and learned to speak English. In 1790, Phillip built a hut for him on what became known as Bennelong Point (now occupied by the Sydney Opera House).

However, their association remained tense after Bennelong's friend, Bangai, was shot dead near Dawe's Point by soldiers in December 1790 for his supposed role in stealing potatoes. Bennelong led a counter-raid by robbing settlers and demanded Phillip to tell him the name of the soldier who killed Bangai. Phillip still wanted to maintain the friendship and by February 1791, Bennelong and the governor had again reached a reconciliation.

== Visit to England ==
Bennelong and another Aboriginal man, named Yemmerrawanne (or Imeerawanyee), travelled with Phillip on Atlantic to England, boarding on 10 December 1792. Many historians have claimed that they were presented to King George III, but there is no direct evidence that this occurred. Soon after their arrival in England, they were hurriedly made clothes that would have been suitable for their presentation to the King.

Jack Brook reconstructs some of their activities from the expense claims lodged with the government. They visited St Paul's Cathedral and the Tower of London. A boat was hired, and they went bathing; they also went to the theatre. While in London, they resided with Henry Waterhouse, and when Yemmerrawanne became sick, they moved to Eltham and resided at the house of Edward Kent, where they were tended by Mr and Mrs Phillips, and met Lord Sydney.

Yemmerrawanne died while in Britain after a serious chest infection, (Note: Medical science in the late 18th century was poorly advanced. "Chest infection" could have meant any number of conditions.) and Bennelong's health deteriorated. He returned to Sydney in February 1795 on HMS Reliance, the ship that took surgeon George Bass to the colony for the first time. Bass nursed him back to health and in exchange Bennelong taught him a sufficient amount of Dharug to enable the former to communicate with the indigenous Eora on arriving in Sydney. Of the 2 years and 10 months he spent abroad, 18 months had been passed either at sea or on board ships in a dock.

== Return to New South Wales ==
Bennelong arrived back in Sydney on 7 September 1795. A letter he had drafted in 1796 to Mr and Mrs Phillip, who was then Lord Sydney's Steward, thanking Mrs Phillip for caring for him in England and asking for stockings and a handkerchief, is the first known text written in English by an Indigenous Australian. This letter is reprinted in the Anthology of Australian Aboriginal Literature (2008) showing its significance.

Within a short time, he took to the bush, reappearing only occasionally to dine at the servants' table in Governor King's residence. Many colonial reports complain of his refusal to rejoin "polished society". He participated in fighting contests over women and officiated at traditional ceremonies, including the last recorded initiation ceremony in Port Jackson in 1797. Bennelong also developed an alcohol problem following his return to Australia.

=== Spearing of a British soldier ===
In December 1797, factional feuding between Bennelong's associates and their opponents resulted in Bennelong's colleague, Colebee, killing an Aboriginal man in a dishonourable fashion. Colebee was subsequently punished in public according to cultural law, but when British soldiers interfered to protect Colebee, Bennelong became enraged. He threw a spear at the soldiers, severely wounding one after the weapon pierced right through the man's abdomen. Bennelong would have been instantly killed for this action had not the provost marshal Thomas Smyth, interceded and dragged Bennelong away. Bennelong was beaten on the head with the butt of a musket and incarcerated for a night. On being released, he threatened the white people and left the settlement.

After this incident, Bennelong became a disreputable person amongst the colonists, being described as "a most insolent and troublesome savage" whose retaliatory action of spearing a soldier had "rendered him more hateful than any of his countrymen". Bennelong also apparently expressed a desire "of spearing the governor whenever he saw him".

=== Leader of the Kissing Point clan ===
Despite the disparaging view the colonists held toward Bennelong, by the early 1800s he had become the leader of a 100-strong group of Aboriginal people, remnants of the dispossessed Port Jackson clans, living on the north side of the Parramatta River to the west of Kissing Point in Wallumedagal country. He was held in respect as an authoritative elder not only by his own group, but also by the remaining Kamaygal and Gweagal people of Botany Bay.

== Death ==
He died on 3 January 1813 at Kissing Point on the Parramatta River in Sydney and was buried in the orchard of the brewer James Squire, a friend to Bennelong and his clan. His death notice in the Sydney Gazette was dismissive, (Note: "Bennelong died on Sunday morning last at Kissing Point. Of this veteran champion of the native tribe little favourable can be said. His voyage to, and benevolent treatment in Great Britain produced no change whatever in his manners and inclinations, which were naturally barbarous and ferocious. The principal Officers of Government had for many years endeavoured, by the kindest of usage to wean him from his original habits, and draw him into a relish for civilized life; but every effort was in vain exerted, and for the last few has been little noticed. His propensity to drunkenness was inordinate; and when in that state he was insolent, menacing and overbearing. In fact, he was a thorough savage, not to be warped from the form and character that nature gave him, by all the efforts that mankind could use.") insisting that "he was a thorough savage, not to be warped from the form and character that nature gave him"—which reflected the feelings of some in Sydney's white society that Bennelong had abandoned his role as ambassador in his last years, and also reflects the deteriorating relations between the two groups as more and more land was cleared and fenced for farming, and the hardening attitudes of many colonists towards "savages" who were not willing to give up their country and become labourers and servants useful to the colonists.

Bennelong's people mourned his death with a traditional highly ritualised battle for which about two hundred people gathered. As a profound mark of respect, Colebee's nephew Nanbaree, who died in 1821, asked to be buried with Bennelong. Bennelong's final wife, Boorong, was also interred in the same gravesite. Bidgee Bidgee, who led the Kissing Point clan for twenty years after Bennelong's death, asked to be buried with Bennelong as well, but there is no record of his death or of where he is buried.

On 20 March 2011, Peter Mitchell of Macquarie University announced that he had located Bennelong's grave site under a residential property at present-day 25 Watson Street, Putney, New South Wales, and stated that local Aboriginal authorities would be consulted about possible further exploration of the site. In November 2018, the New South Wales Government announced that it had bought the house and would turn the site into a public memorial to Bennelong, together with a museum commemorating the impact of British colonisation on the Aboriginal people of the Sydney area.

== Family ==
Bennelong had several wives. The first, whose name is not known, died prior to his capture, probably from smallpox in 1789. He then married the widowed Cammeray clanswoman Barangaroo. Their daughter Dilboong died in infancy. Upon Barangaroo's death in 1791, Bennelong cremated her remains in Arthur Phillip's garden. Bennelong then abducted and took up with a Gweagal woman, Kurubarabulu. They stayed together a year until his departure for England. On his return, she had found another mate. Bennelong had a son named Dickey with his final wife, Boorong. Dickey was adopted by Anglican priest William Walker and christened as Thomas Walter Coke. Boorong was later buried with Bennelong when they had both died.

== Legacy ==
Bennelong's legacy was long contested. Among many others, Manning Clark wrote: "Bennelong disgusted his civilizers and became an exile from his own people." He was seen as a tragic figure, due to being "caught between two worlds" as well as due to the alcoholism he developed later in life. In recent decades, he has been defended, as someone who saw the best and worst of Western civilization and, having done so, rejected it, recreating a modified form of traditional lifestyle at Kissing Point.

Bennelong has also been recognised as a warrior who could switch between the British and Aboriginal worlds, and use the colonists' desire for conciliation as an advantage to both himself and his people. His on-again, off-again friendship with the British governors ultimately saw other Aboriginal people being brought into contact with the colony at Sydney. In contributing to some of the first cross-cultural communication between the groups, he helped establish a tenuous peace between the Eora and the British that enabled some Aboriginal people to continue to exist as survivors in their own colonised land.

=== Places named after Bennelong ===
- Bennelong Park is a small park next to Kissing Point in Putney, Sydney, near where Bennelong died.
- A small plaque in Cleves Park in Putney marks the area near where he was thought to be buried.
- Nearby on the south side of Parramatta River, Bennelong Bridge crosses Homebush Bay.
- The seat of Bennelong in the Federal parliament, which includes Putney, is named after him; Bennelong was the first Indigenous Australian to be honoured in the name of an electoral division.
- Bennelong Point, today the site of the Sydney Opera House, is named after him.
- An ostracod genus, Bennelongia, was named after him in 1981; this genus is endemic to Australia and New Zealand.

== Portrayals ==
Bennelong was played by actor Charles Yunupingu in the 1980 TV series The Timeless Land.

Actor Jacob Junior Nayinggul portrayed Bennelong in re-enactment sequences in the 2022 documentary series The Australian Wars.

Actor Googoorewon Knox played Bennelong in the 2026 play Bennelong in London.

== See also ==
- Destiny in Sydney: An epic novel of convicts, Aborigines, and Chinese embroiled in the birth of Sydney, Australia
- List of Indigenous Australian historical figures

== Notes and citations ==
=== Sources ===
- Anon. (n.d.). "Coke, Thomas Walter". Dictionary of Sydney.
- Anon. (18 November 2018). "Bennelong's burial site to be turned into public memorial". The Guardian. Australian Associated Press.
- Brook, Jack (2001). "The Forlorn Hope: Bennelong and Yemmerrawannie Go to England". Australian Aboriginal Studies: 36–47.
- Daley, Paul (18 November 2018). "Bennelong's grave: how history betrayed Australia's first diplomat". The Guardian.
- Dark, Eleanor (1966). "Bennelong (1764–1813)". Australian Dictionary of Biography. Australian Dictionary of Biography. Vol. 1. National Centre of Biography, Australian National University. ISBN 978-0-522-84459-7. ISSN 1833-7538. OCLC 70677943.
- de Deckker, Patrick; McKenzie, Kenneth G. (1981). "Bennelongia, A new Cyprididid Ostracod Genus from Australasia" (PDF). Transactions of the Royal Society of South Australia. 105: 53–56. Archived from the original (PDF) on 20 October 2022.
- Duff, Eamonn (20 March 2011). "Bennelong's grave found under a front yard in Sydney's suburbs". The Sydney Morning Herald.
- Fullagar, Kate (2009a). "Preface: Woollarawarre Bennelong: rethinking the tragic narrative". Aboriginal History. 33: 3–6. ISSN 0314-8769. JSTOR 24046820.
- Fullagar, Kate (2009b). "Bennelong in Britain". Aboriginal History. 33: 31–51. JSTOR 24046822.
- Fullagar, Kate (2015). "From Pawns to Players:Rewriting the Lives of Three Indigenous Go-Betweens". In Jackson, Will; Manktelow, Emily (eds.). Subverting Empire: Deviance and Disorder in the British Colonial World. Springer. pp. 22–42. ISBN 978-1-137-46587-0.
- Gazette (9 January 1813). "Bennelong". The Sydney Gazette and New South Wales Advertiser. p. 2 – via Trove.
- The Australian Wars (TV mini series 2022) at IMDb
- Karskens, Grace (2010). The Colony: A History of Early Sydney. Allen & Unwin. ISBN 978-1-742-69058-2.
- Hoskins, Ian (2009). Sydney Harbour: A History. University of New South Wales Press Ltd. ISBN 978-1-921410-16-1.
- Shakespeare, Nicholas (2010). In Tasmania: Adventures at the End of the World. Random House. ISBN 978-1-407-07415-3.
- Smith, Keith Vincent (2009). "Bennelong among his people". Aboriginal History. 33: 7–30. JSTOR 24046821.
- Tench, Watkin (1793). Complete Account of the Settlement at Port Jackson in New South Wales Including An Accurate Description of the Situation of the Colony; of the Natives; and of Its Natural Productions. London: G. Nicol and J. Sewell.
- Van Toorn, Penny (2006). Writing Never Arrives Naked: Early Aboriginal Cultures of Writing in Australia. Aboriginal Studies Press. ISBN 978-0-855-75544-7.
