= Keith Vincent Smith =

Australian writer, historian and journalist

- Born: Keith Vincent Smith; Dee Why, New South Wales, Australia
- Education: Macquarie University
- Occupations: Writer, historian, journalist

Dr Keith Vincent Smith (1939 – November 2022) was an Australian writer, historian and journalist. He was a notable researcher of early Sydney and Indigenous Australians of the Sydney area, including the lives of the Eora peoples, Bungaree, and Bennelong.

== Early life ==
Keith Vincent Smith was born in Dee Why, on the Northern Beaches of Sydney.

== Journalism ==
As a journalist, Keith Smith worked for the Sydney Morning Herald and The Australian and was a correspondent for Australian Associated Press in London, Saigon and Sydney. He was a correspondent covering the Vietnam War.

== Interest in pre-colonial Sydney ==
As a mature student, studying progressively for first, masters, and doctorate degrees at Macquarie University, Smith developed a strong interest in early colonial Sydney and the inhabitants of the area before British colonisation.

== Publications ==
=== As author ===
- Sydney City, Smith's Guides, (1988)
- King Bungaree: A Sydney Aborigine meets the great South Pacific Explorers, 1799–1830, Kangaroo Press, (1992)
- Bennelong: The coming in of the Eora, Sydney Cove 1788–1792, Kangaroo Press/Simon & Schuster, (2001)
- Wallumedegal: An Aboriginal history of Ryde, City of Ryde, (2005)
- MARI NAWI: Aboriginal Odysseys, Rosenberg, (2010)

=== As contributor ===
- Governor Phillip and a man named Bennelong, Australian Heritage, Volume 1, (2005)
- Bennelong, Ambassador of the Eora, Australian Heritage, Volume 2, (2006)
- Bennelong among his people, Aboriginal History, Vol. 33, ANU Press, (2009)
- The many faces of Bungaree, in Bungaree The First Australian, Mosman Art Gallery, (2013)
- 15 biographical entries at The Dictionary of Sydney, including on Bennelong and Pemulwuy

== TV series ==
As senior researcher:

Episode 1, First Australians, Blackfella Films, dir. Rachel Perkins, originally broadcast on SBS in 2009.
