= Willemering =

Aboriginal man who speared Governor Phillip

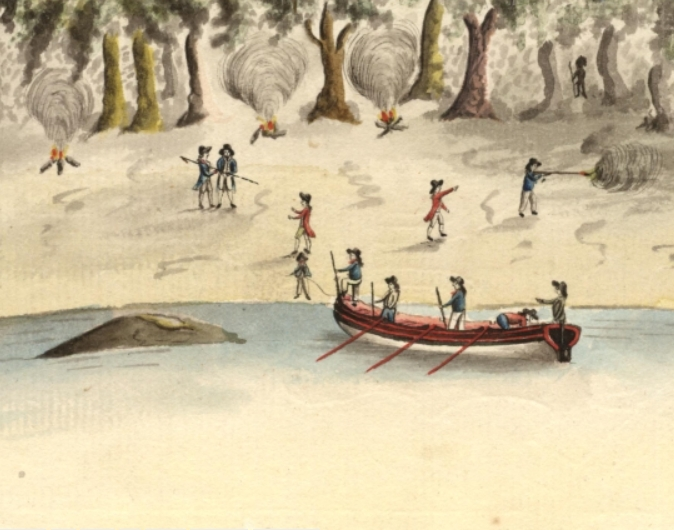
Painting depicting Arthur Phillip at Manly Cove being speared by Willemering

Willemering or Wileemarin (c.1755 – c.1800) was a man of the Eora people of Aboriginal Australians who on 7 September 1790 became a notable identity by spearing Arthur Phillip, the first governor of New South Wales.

== Early life ==
Willemering was described in 1790 as being middle-aged which, in 18th-century terms, would probably place his birth at around 1755. He was said to have been from a clan located around Broken Bay, however another source recorded Willemering as being of the Kay-Yee-My (Kayimai) clan from modern day Balgowlah.

== The spearing of Arthur Phillip ==
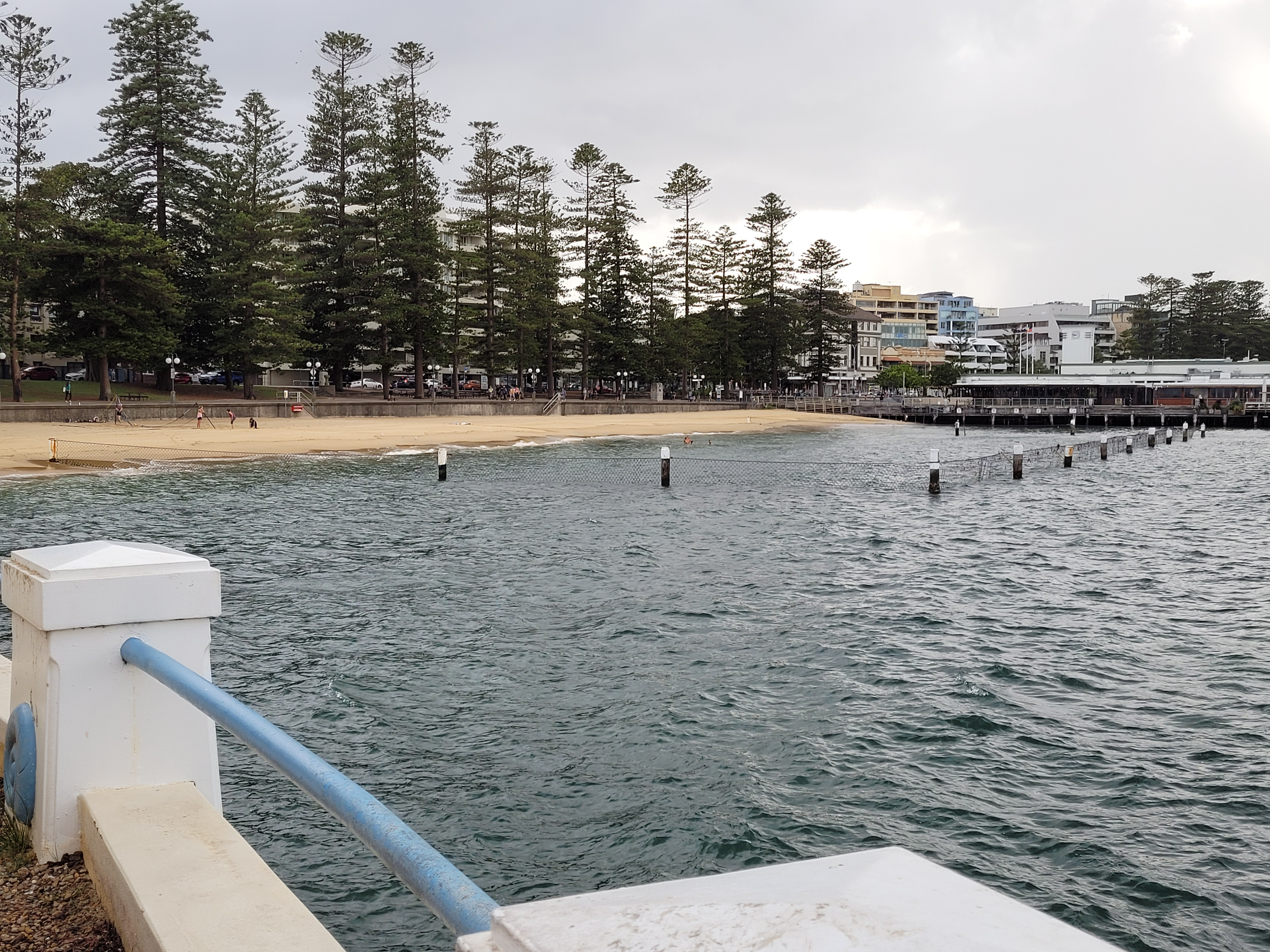
Site of Arthur Phillip's spearing at Manly Cove looking east towards modern day ferry terminal

On 7 September 1790, about 200 Aboriginal people, which included the well-known Bennelong, had congregated at Manly Cove Beach to feast upon a whale which had washed up on the shore. Some of this whale-meat was sent to be given to Governor Arthur Phillip as a present. Governor Phillip was himself at nearby South Head planning the construction of a navigation beacon and on his return journey to Sydney encountered the boat with the gift of whale-meat. Phillip was eager to meet with Bennelong and directed his boat to proceed to Manly Cove after first going back to South Head to procure the firearms deposited there.

Arriving at Manly Cove, Phillip disembarked onto the beach and met with Bennelong to whom he gave food and wine. Phillip asked Bennelong for a barbed spear that he saw, but Bennelong refused and instead lay the spear near to where Willemering was standing. About half an hour into the meeting, Willemering, who had picked up the spear, came forward. Phillip, attempting to defuse what he saw as a potential hostile situation, started to approach Willemering, throwing his sword to the ground and calling out weree, weree which in Eoran language meant "bad, bad". Willemering became agitated by Phillip's actions and with rapid dexterity and the aid of a woomera, threw the barbed spear at Phillip. The spear struck the Governor on his right shoulder just above the collar-bone, piercing through his body with the tip exiting his back close to the third cervical vertebra.

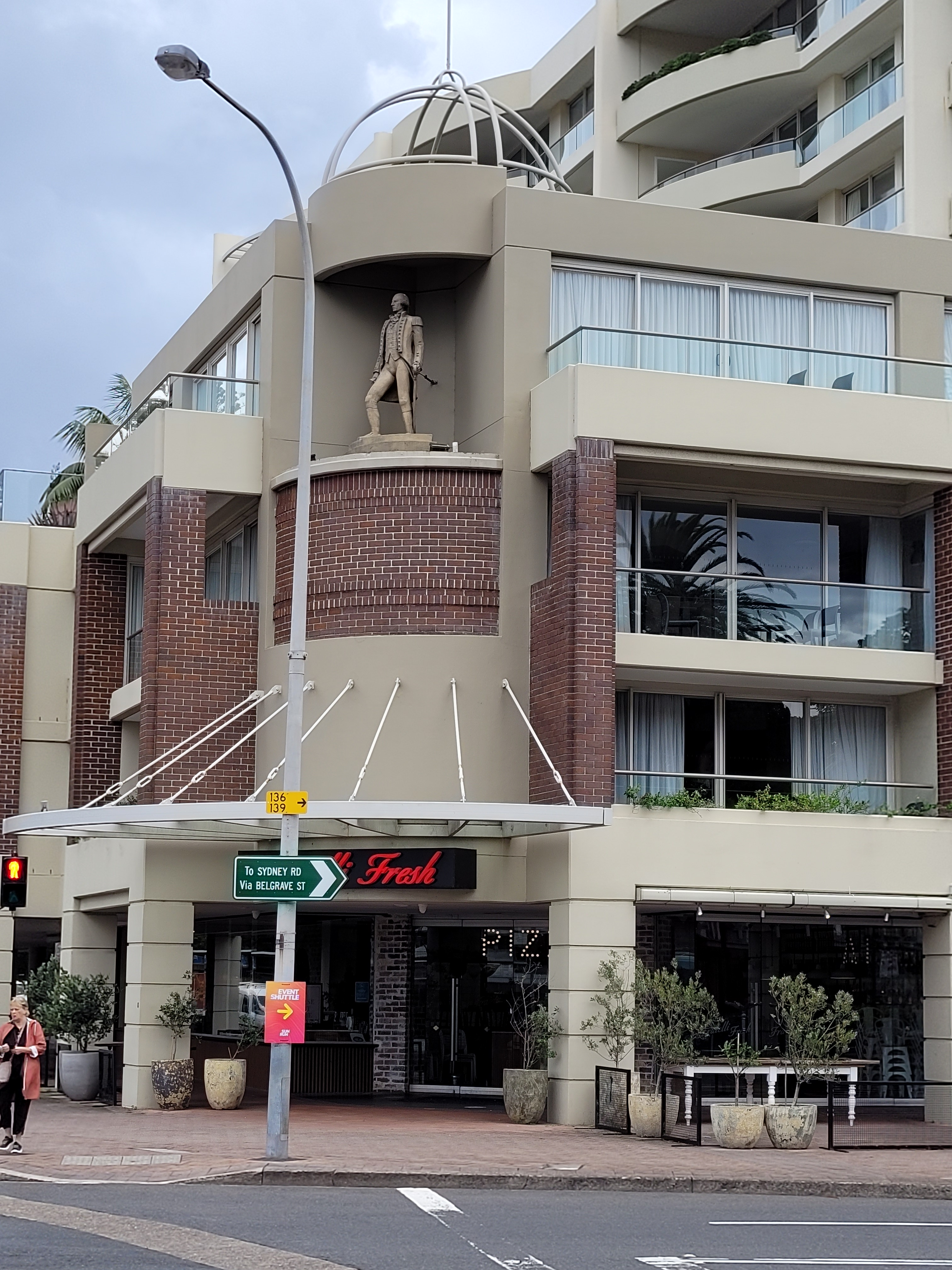
Arthur Phillip statue overlooking Manly Cove, Manly NSW, 2022

Willemering and the other Aboriginal people instantly scattered with a few more spears being thrown. The Governor and his group attempted to return to the boat, but they were impeded significantly by the 10 foot spear hanging from Phillip's body which continually jammed against the ground slowing his progress and further lacerating his wound. The shaft of the spear was eventually cut and Phillip made it to the boat under the cover of musket-fire. They then quickly returned to the British settlement at Sydney Cove.

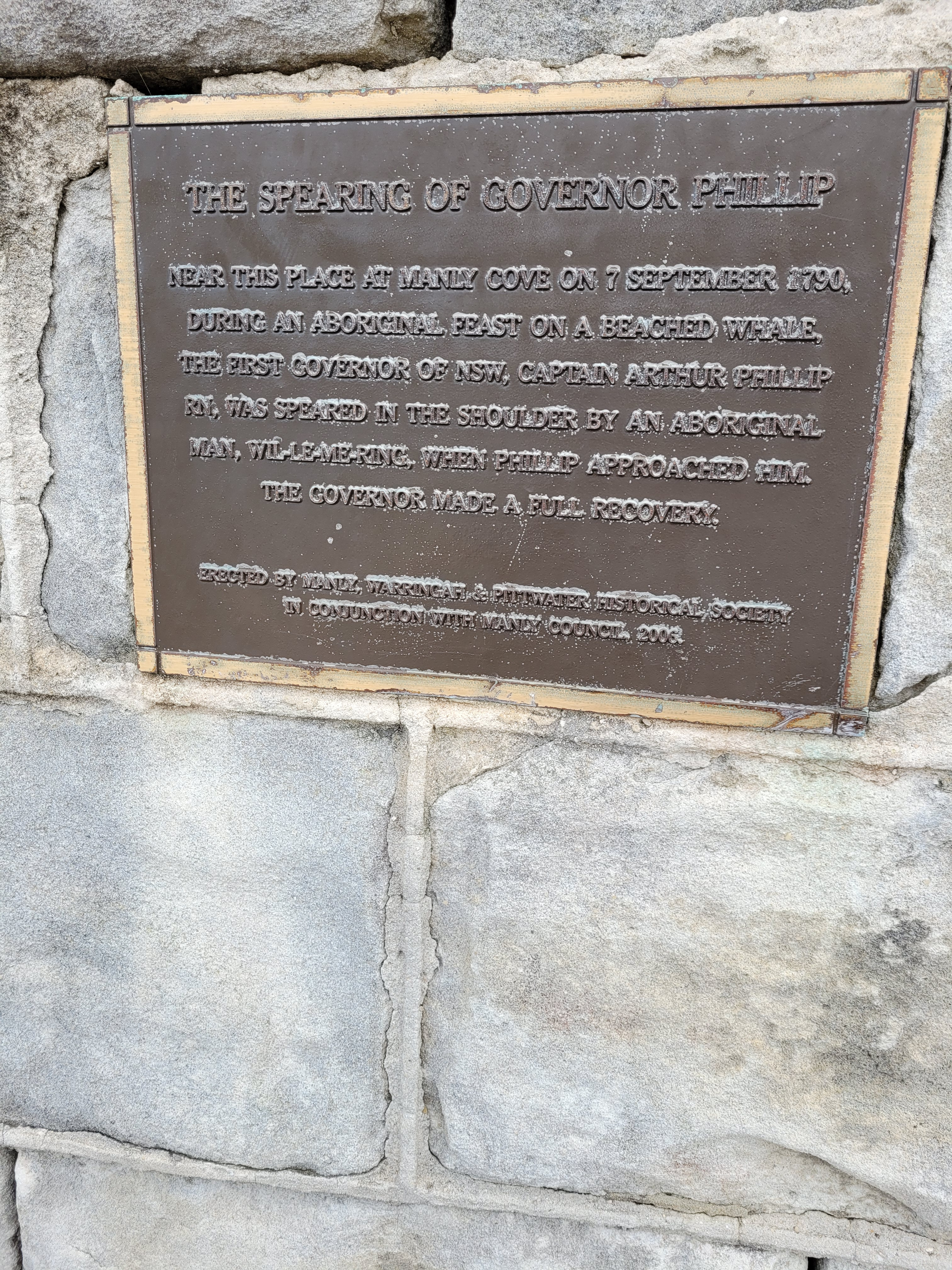
2006 commemorative plaque at Manly Cove recording Willemering's spearing of Governor Arthur Phillip

== Aftermath of the spearing ==
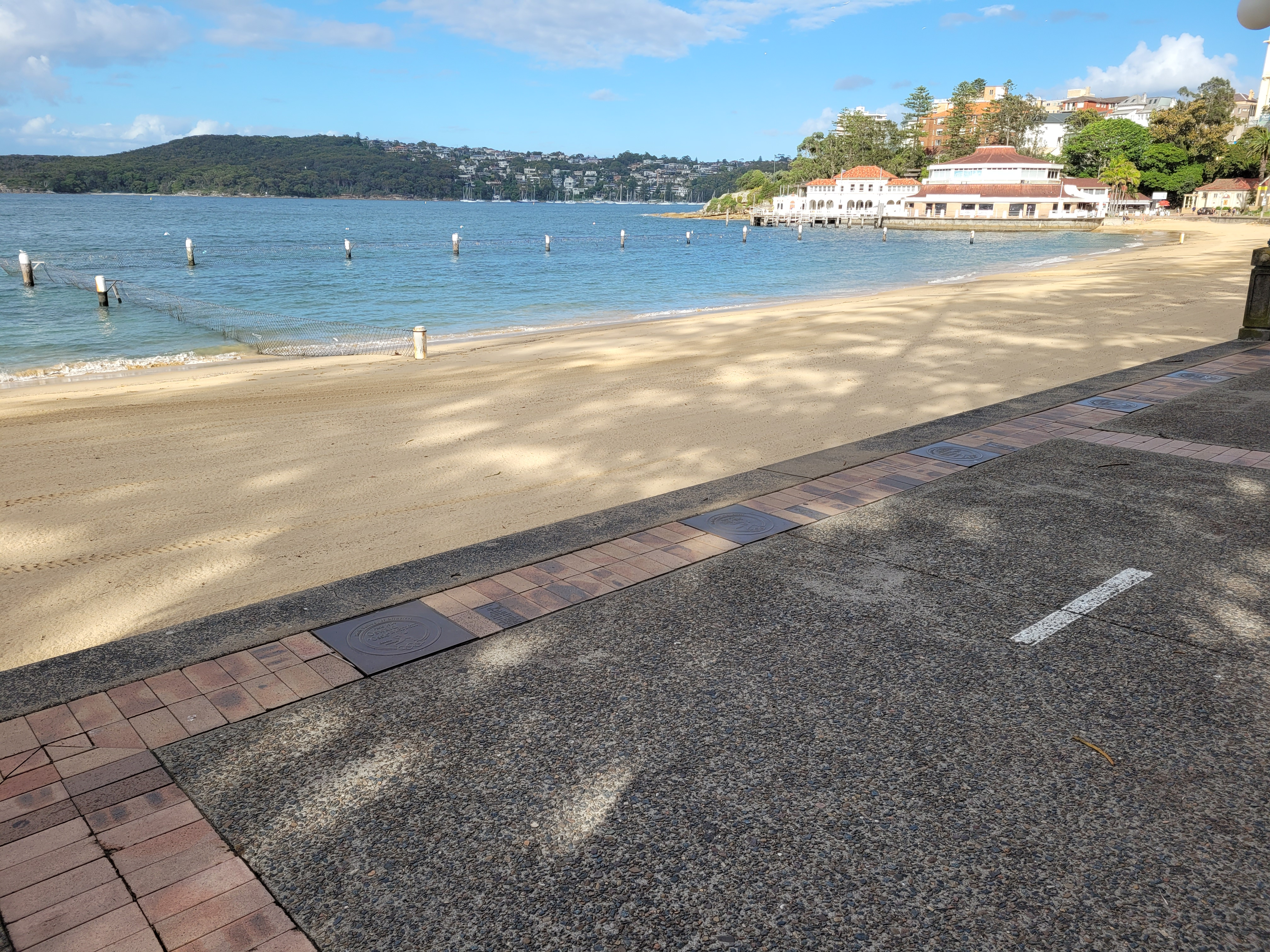
Looking west from the site of Arthur Phillip's landing at Manly Cove and spearing by Willemering

Although Phillip bled considerably from the wound while in the boat, it was later found that no artery had been cut and the remaining portion of the barbed spear was removed by the assistant surgeon William Balmain. The Governor recovered from the wound within two weeks, and on 17 September went to meet with Bennelong in order to arrange the handing over of Willemering to the British. Bennelong claimed that he had punished or was going to punish Willemering for spearing the Governor. Phillip found this adequate and ordered that no Aboriginal people be fired upon in retribution for Willemering's actions. A later punitive expedition organised by the Governor and proclaimed as an operation to punish Willemering, was deliberate misinformation to conceal the fact that expedition's aim was to inflict mortality upon the Aboriginal people of Botany Bay.

It has been suggested by some historians that Willemering had been enlisted by Bennelong to carry out the spearing as revenge upon Arthur Phillip, who had organised the kidnapping of Bennelong some months previous to the incident.

Nothing further is known of Willemering except that Bennelong wounded him in the thigh with a spear at Barangaroo's funeral in 1791.

== Legacy ==
Willemering is notable as the only Aboriginal person to make a direct assault upon the principal British official in the Australian colonies during the frontier conflicts. In 2006, a plaque commemorating Willemering's spearing of Arthur Phillip was affixed upon a monument at Manly Cove.

Willemering's spearing of Phillip was depicted via reenactment in the 2022 documentary series The Australian Wars. Willemering and Phillip are portrayed by actors Warren Williams and Barry Lee-Pearce respectively.

== See also ==
- List of Indigenous Australian historical figures
