= Chest infection =

Chest infection may refer to:

- Upper respiratory tract infection
- Lower respiratory tract infection
- Bronchitis
- Pneumonia
- Pleurisy
- Tuberculosis
