= William Bradley (Royal Navy officer) =

Royal Navy officer (1758–1833)

Rear-Admiral William Bradley
- Born: 14 November 1758; Portsmouth, Hampshire, England
- Died: 13 March 1833 (aged 74); Le Havre, France
- Spouse: Sarah Witchell (m. 1787)
- Military career
- Allegiance: United Kingdom
- Branch: Royal Navy
- Service years: 1772 to 1812
- Rank: Rear-Admiral (struck off)
- Commands: HMS Comet; HMS Champion; HMS Plantagenet
- Conflicts: Glorious First of June

William Bradley (14 November 1758 – 13 March 1833) was a British naval officer and cartographer who was one of the officers who participated in the First Fleet to Australia. During this expedition, Bradley undertook extensive surveys and became one of the first of the settlers to establish relations with the Aboriginal Peoples, with whom he struck up a dialogue and whose customs and nature he studied extensively. He later however fell out with his Aboriginal contacts and instead undertook a mission to gather food which ended with an eleven-month stay on Norfolk Island after a shipwreck.

Bradley's later career was overshadowed by his steadily deteriorating mental state. Although a successful small ship commander, Bradley became increasingly erratic and was eventually retired as a result. A few years later, suffering serious mental problems, Bradley committed a highly unusual case of postal fraud and was ultimately exiled. He never returned to Britain but lived in quiet disgrace in France.

== Early career ==
Bradley was born on 14 November 1758 in Portsmouth, a great-nephew of the third Astronomer Royal, James Bradley. His family was closely associated with the Royal Naval Academy and both his younger brother James and his father John Bradley served on the faculty. Bradley entered the Royal Navy in 1772, and served on a rapid succession of ships before becoming lieutenant in 1778. He continued in service aboard HMS Lenox, HMS Aldborough, HMS Mermaid, HMS Rippon, HMS Prothee, HMS Phaeton and HMS Ariadne until 1786, when he joined HMS Sirius. His service during the American Revolutionary War was not significant, but Bradley was attached on the Sirius to the First Fleet destined to colonise Australia.

== Service in Australia ==
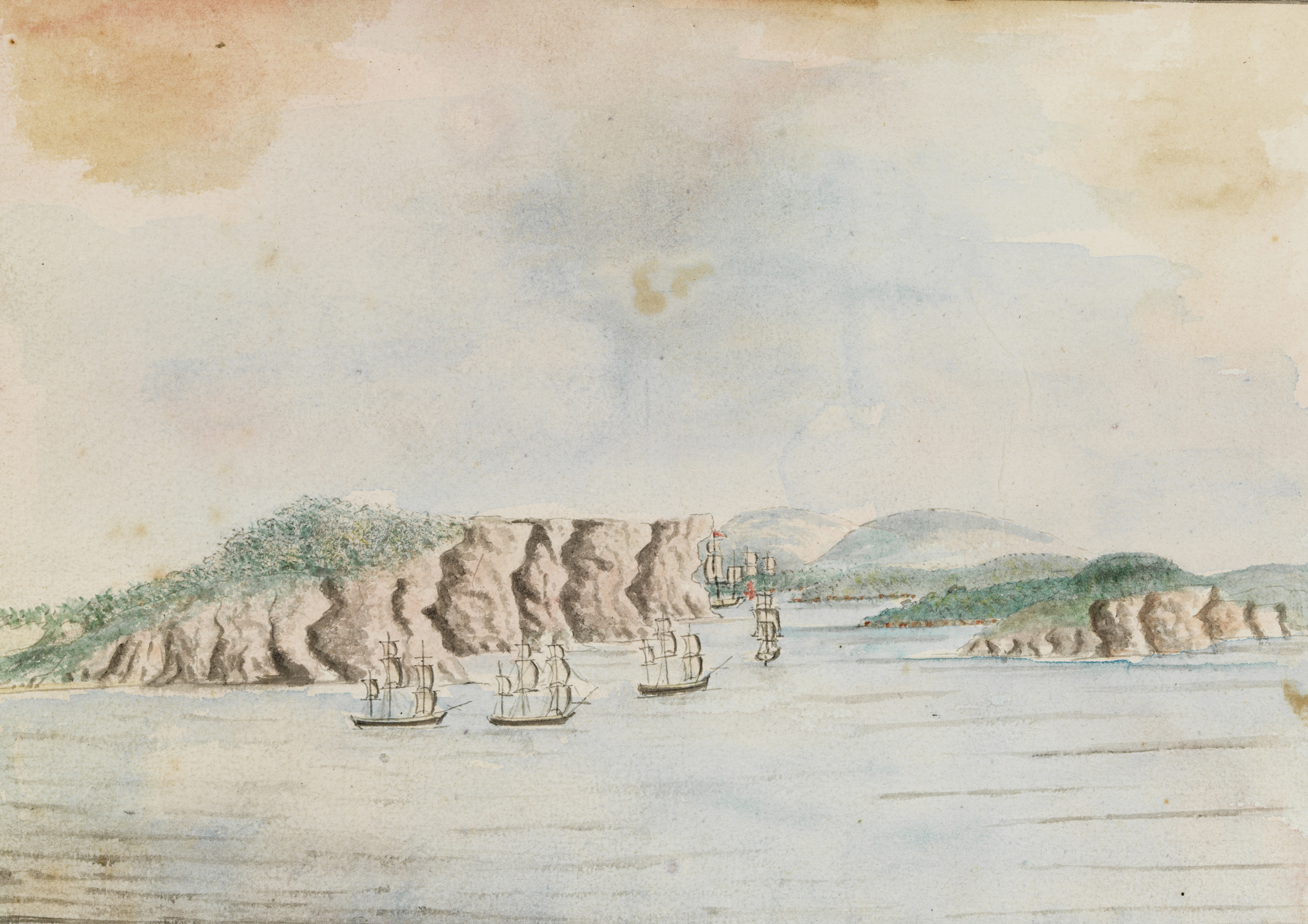
First Fleet Entering Port Jackson, by William Bradley, Safe 1 / 14 Op p.65

During 1788, Bradley did not involve himself directly in colonial affairs, but instead joined John Hunter in extensive operations along the Sydney Harbour coastline. The two men were often away from the colony for extended periods, conducting surveys of the coastline and the lands around.

A keen note-taker and sketcher, Bradley compiled a journal which begins in 1786 with the organisation of the fleet from Deptford and records the voyage to Australia. It describes ports, ships passed, the weather, as well as difficulties on board. Bradley also recounts his impressions of the colony as well as his interest in Aboriginal people and natural history. He was an early champion of the original inhabitants, but several experiences later changed his view to one substantially more negative. On 1 October 1788, he wrote in his journal, "What has been experienced lately in several instances of meeting with the natives, has occasioned me to alter those very favourable opinions I had formed of them, and however much I wished to encourage the idea of their being friendly disposed, I must acknowledge, now convinced, that they are only so when they suppose we have them in our power or are well prepared by being armed. Latterly they have attacked almost every person who has met with them that has not had a musket and have sometimes endeavoured to surprise some who had."

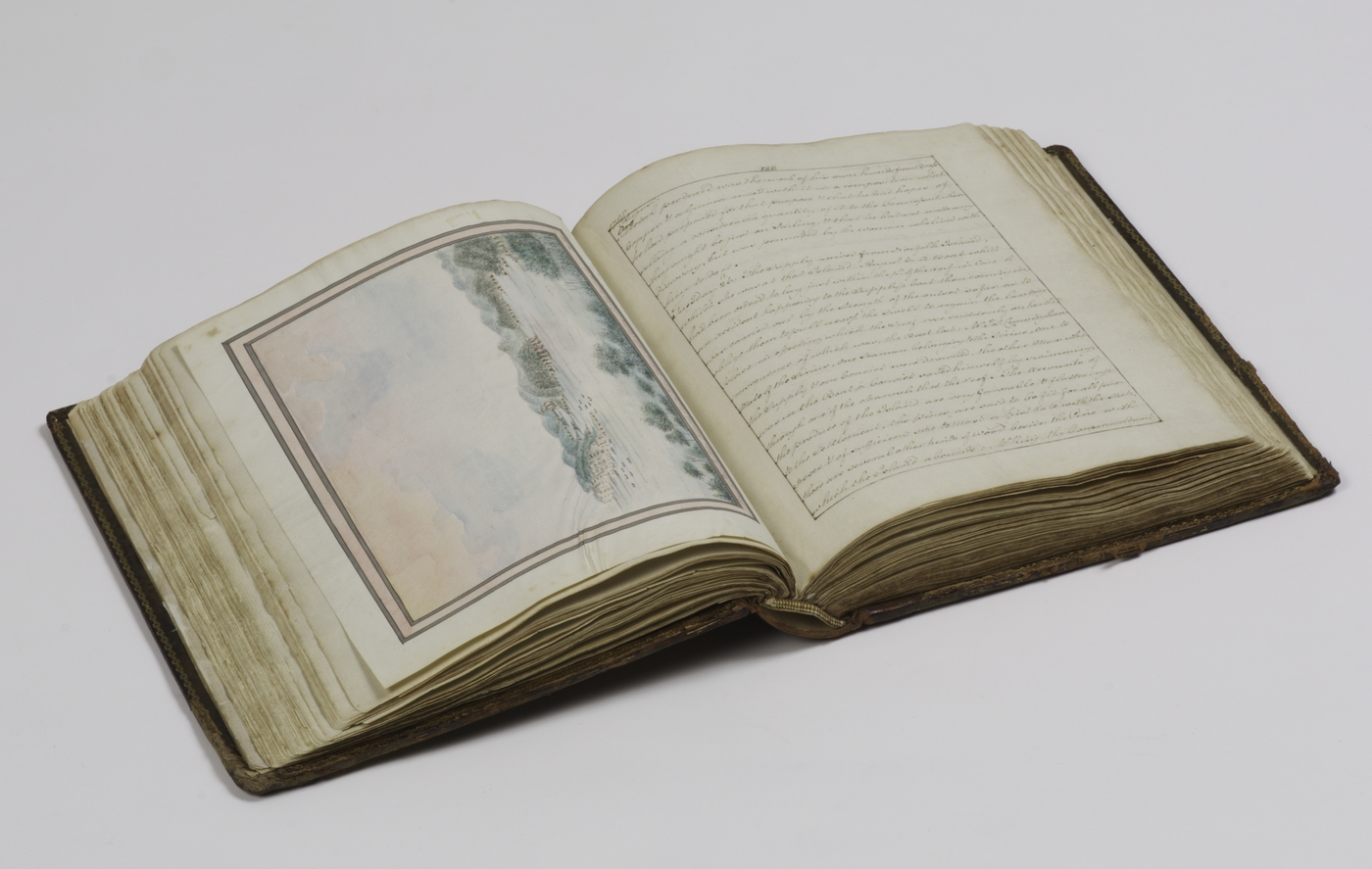
Journal by William Bradley held by the State Library of New South Wales, Safe 1 / 14 Op p.65

In October 1788, Bradley joined a six-month circumnavigation of the globe to collect supplies for the colony from the Cape of Good Hope. Returning in March 1789, Bradley worked on the repair of Sirius, combined with further survey and more observations of Aboriginal communities. His previously positive view of the Aboriginal people gradually soured into a general hostility. In November 1789 He took part in a raid which captured local Aboriginal leaders Colbee and Bennelong, a duty which Bradley described as extremely unpleasant.

In 1790, Sirius and HMS Supply were dispatched to Norfolk Island in search of better food supplies. At Norfolk Island, the Sirius was caught in a storm and wrecked. Marooned on the island, Bradley his crew conducted extensive surveys of the land during the eleven months spent there. In 1791, Bradley and others returned to Port Jackson and from there took a ship to the Philippines and then to Britain. The ships arrived in 1792 and the crews were court-martialled for the loss of Sirius, but honourably acquitted.

== French Revolutionary Wars ==
Bradley was promoted to master and commander in 1791, and in 1793 was given the fire ship HMS Comet as part of the Channel Fleet under Lord Howe. In May 1794, a year after the outbreak of the French Revolutionary Wars, Howe's fleet began the Atlantic campaign of May 1794, chasing a French grain convoy deep into the Atlantic. The campaign concluded with the battle of the Glorious First of June, where Howe's fleet defeated an equally sized French force but failed to stop the convoy. Bradley acted as a signal repeater during the campaign, relaying Howe's signals to the large fleet. He performed so well at this duty that he was promoted to post-captain in the aftermath of the campaign.

Bradley soon took command of the frigate HMS Cambrian and served in her on the Halifax station for the next eight years. He returned to Britain in 1802 on the Peace of Amiens and in 1805 took command of the ship of the line HMS Plantagenet. In neither of Bradley's commands did he perform any significant or notable service, remaining on convoy and blockade duties. In 1809 however, Bradley suffered the first of his increasingly severe mental disturbances.

== Mental illness ==
Removed from service by his illness, Bradley later joined the impress unit at Cowes, but in 1812 again suffered a mental breakdown, and was retired as a rear-admiral. Two years later, Bradley suffered personal disaster when he was caught involved in a minor attempt to defraud the postal authorities. Arrested and brought before the Winchester Assizes, his conduct was noted as being highly unusual, but this was not taken into account initially and he was stripped of his rank and pension and sentenced to death. Appeals from his family later brought about a reduction of sentence, firstly to transportation and subsequently exile.

Retiring to Le Havre, France in 1816, Bradley devoted the sane hours of his life to a series of inventions designed to easily calculate longitude. He hoped that by inventing such a device, the Admiralty might be persuaded to reverse his sentence and permit him to return to Britain. This never occurred, and attempts by his family to get the sentence repealed on the grounds of his insanity were equally fruitless. Bradley finally gave up these efforts after years of failure and died in France, a recluse, in March 1833.

Bradley left three daughters and a son. His wife described him as 'a kind husband and affectionate father', but fellow officers often considered him disagreeable and aloof. He left behind a large body of work on the coasts and Aboriginal Peoples of the Sydney area which is still available in the State Library of New South Wales. This work includes, surveys, charts, personal observations and sketches.

His name is commemorated in the name of Bradleys Head in Sydney Harbour.

== See also ==
- First Fleet
- Journals of the First Fleet
