= Gadigal =

Indigenous Australians of the Sydney region

Gadigal people
- aka: Cadigal; Caddiegal (Tindale)

Hierarchy
- Language family: Pama–Nyungan
- Language branch: Yuin-Kuric
- Language group: Dharug
- Group dialects: Cadigal

Area (approx. 700 km^{2} (270 sq mi))
- Bioregion: Sydney basin
- Location: Eastern suburbs, Inner West, Port Jackson
- Coordinates: 33°50′S 151°5′E
- Rivers: Cooks, Parramatta
- Other geological: Port Jackson

Notable individuals
- Nanbaree

The Gadigal, also spelled Cadigal and Caddiegal, are a group of Aboriginal people whose traditional lands are located in Gadi, on Eora country, the location of Sydney, New South Wales, Australia. However, since the colonisation of Australia, most Gadigal people have been displaced from their traditional lands.

== Pre-colonisation history ==
The Gadigal people originally inhabited the area that they call "Gadi", which lies south of Port Jackson, covering today's Sydney central business district and stretching from South Head across to Marrickville/Petersham with part of the southern boundary lying on the Cooks River. They are the traditional owners of Sydney Cove, the site of the first British settlement in Australia. "'Cadi'" (or "'Gadi'") in the local Dharug dialect meant "below" or "under", indicating that the Cadi-gal belonged to the land below Port Jackson.

Philip Gidley King gave Long Cove as the western boundary which lieutenant governor David Collins identified with present-day Darling Harbour. Arthur Phillip, in a letter to Lord Sydney in February 1790, also reported: "From the entrance of the harbour, along the south shore, to the cove adjoining this settlement the district is called Cadi, and the tribe Cadigal; the women, Cadigalleon."

The Gadigal are coastal people who were previously dependent on the harbour for providing most of their food whilst they were living in their traditional lands. They are one of seven clans from coastal Sydney who speak a common language and have become known as the Eora people. "'Eora'" refers to "people" or "of this place" in Dharug language.

== British colonisation of Gadigal country ==
Soon after his arrival at Port Jackson, Governor Arthur Phillip estimated the Aboriginal population of the area at around 1,500 people, although other estimates range from as low as 200 to as high as 4,000. The Gadigal clan was estimated to have 50-80 people.

The colonisation of the land by British settlers and the subsequent introduction of infectious diseases including smallpox decimated the Gadigal people and their neighbours. The 1789 smallpox epidemic was estimated to have killed about 50% of the Eora population, with only three Gadigal survivors. (Note: This epidemic is unlikely to have been a natural event.(Warren 2013, pp. 68–86)) However, archaeological evidence suggests that some Gadigal people may have escaped to the Concord area and settled there. Since colonisation and its subsequent spread, most Gadigal people have been displaced from their traditional lands.

The former Marrickville Council area, now part of Inner West Council, is situated within Gadigal country and bordering Wangal country. In 1994, the Marrickville Aboriginal Consultative Committee was established and the committee established the Cadigal/Wangal peoples' website.

Gadigal elder Allen Madden estimates that several hundred Dharug people, including at least a hundred Gadigal people in his own family, live in Sydney today.

== Popular culture ==
Australian band Midnight Oil included a song, "Gadigal Land", as a single on their The Makarrata Project mini-album project. The song includes a verse written and spoken by Gadigal poet Joel Davison. A statement from Sony Music Australia explained: "It is a provocative recount of what happened in this place, and elsewhere in Australia, since 1788."

In October 2023, the New South Wales government renamed a Sydney Metro station to Gadigal railway station whilst it was under construction, which had formerly been named Pitt Street station.

== Notable people ==
Nanbaree was a young Gadigal boy who survived the smallpox outbreak in 1789. He was taken to the British colonial outpost at Sydney and became an important interpreter between the Indigenous people and the British.

== See also ==
- Aboriginal Australians
