= Barangaroo =

Aboriginal Australian woman (1750–1791)

- Born: c.1750
- Died: 1791
- Known for: Prominent Eora woman during the early stages of the British colonisation of Australia.
- Spouse: Bennelong

Barangaroo (c. 1750 – 1791) was an Aboriginal Australian woman best known for her interactions with the British colony of New South Wales during the first years of the European colonisation of Australia. A member of the Cammeraygal clan, she was the wife of Bennelong, who served as a prominent interlocutor between local Aboriginal people and the colonists.

Barangaroo was married to another man, and had two children with him prior to marrying Bennelong. Her first husband and two children all died before the second marriage, with the husband allegedly dying of smallpox. Barangaroo had a daughter named Dilboong with Bennelong, before dying shortly after in 1791; Dilboong only lived for a few months before dying. Barangaroo had a traditional cremation ceremony with her fishing gear, and her ashes were scattered by Bennelong around Governor Arthur Phillip's garden, located in the modern-day Circular Quay.

Like Bennelong, Barangaroo had a considerable influence on settler-Aboriginal relations during the first years of the British colonisation of New South Wales. When she first met the colonists in 1790, Barangaroo was described as being in her early 40's and was noted for her refusal to interact with the settlers in any significant way. Initially refusing to visit the colonists at Sydney Cove, she eventually went to meet Philip in 1791. Historians have argued that Barangaroo served as a matriarch of the Cammeraygal via her role as a fisherwoman.

== The accounts of Watkin Tench ==
Watkin Tench, a British marine who came to Australia on board the First Fleet, described in his first-hand account A Complete Account of the Settlement at Port Jackson several encounters with Barangaroo. At the first meeting between the colonists and Barangaroo in October 1790, he described how Bennelong presented her wearing a petticoat. "But this was the prudery of the wilderness, which her husband (Bennelong) joined us to ridicule, and we soon laughed her out of it. The petticoat was dropped with hesitation, and Barangaroo stood 'armed cap-a-pee in nakedness'." Tench said at the request of Bennelong "we combed and cut her hair, and she seemed pleased with the operation". She would not taste any of the wine that she was offered, even though she was invited to do so by Bennelong. He also describes an occasion where a convict was flogged in front of an audience of Aboriginal people, for stealing from them. Barangaroo was angry, and menaced the man performing the flogging with a stick. His final mention of Barangaroo in the text is to describe how Bennelong would strike Barangaroo with blows and kicks and "every other mark of brutality".

== Legacy ==
A 22-hectare (54-acre) suburban area at Sydney's east Darling Harbour, not located in her traditional lands, was officially named in her honour in October 2006. The site was formerly a dockland precinct, once known as The Hungry Mile, used for shipping, and has since been redeveloped into commercial office spaces, residences, a casino, hotel, and parklands.

SS Barangaroo was a ferry operating across Sydney Harbour prior to the opening of the Sydney Harbour Bridge. Barangaroo Street in the Canberra suburb of Chisholm is named in her honour.

== See also ==
- List of Indigenous Australian historical figures
