= Arabanoo =

Indigenous Australian captured by British colonists

Arabanoo (c. 1759 – 1789) was an Aboriginal Australian man of the Eora forcibly abducted on New Year's Eve 1788 by British colonists who arrived with the First Fleet at Port Jackson. His capture was organised to force communication and relations between the Aboriginal people and the British. Governor Arthur Phillip came to esteem Arabanoo highly. He was the first Aboriginal Australian to live among Europeans.

== Background ==
In January 1788, the First Fleet of British convict ships arrived at Sydney Harbour, New South Wales and founded a penal settlement at Sydney Cove, on lands occupied by the Australian Aboriginal Eora people. The first Governor of New South Wales, Captain Arthur Phillip RN arrived with orders from King George III to "endeavour by every possible means to open an Intercourse with the Natives and to conciliate their affections, enjoining all Our Subjects to live in amity and kindness with them."

Governor Phillip set out to establish good relations with the Eora, but small conflicts arose through the first months of settlement. The new colony struggled to establish agriculture for its own nourishment, while sapping the natural resources harvested by the Eora. Phillip determined to end this "state of petty warfare and endless uncertainty", deciding to kidnap one or two Eora, explaining in a letter to Lord Sydney, "It was absolutely necessary that we should attain their language, or teach them ours, that the means of redress might be pointed out to them, if they are injured, and to reconcile them by showing the many advantages they would enjoy by mixing with us."

== Capture of Arabanoo ==
In late December 1788, Lieutenant George Johnston of the marines and Lieutenant Henry Lidgbird Ball of the Royal Navy set out to Manly cove to capture Aboriginal people. Two men were seized, but one escaped by dragging his captor into deeper water until he was released. Arabanoo, however, had a rope thrown around his neck and was dragged to the boat screaming. The commotion alerted many of his kinsmen who threw numerous spears at Johnston and Ball to try to prevent the abduction. Muskets were fired over their heads while Arabanoo was tied to the seat of the boat and rowed away to Sydney cove. He appeared to be about 30 years old.

== Captivity ==
Arabanoo was taken to Phillip's house where he was washed, shaved and given a meal of duck and fish. He was dressed in a shirt, jacket and trousers, with the shirt later catching fire when he was resting too close to a fire. Phillip initially called him Manly, until Arabanoo informed him of his real name. In order to prevent him from escaping, Arabanoo was usually restrained by handcuff and rope, or iron chains, and was locked in a hut with a convict at night. When Arabanoo was first cuffed, he believed the handcuffs to be unique ornaments, but he became enraged when he discovered the purpose.

After New Year's Day, Phillip ordered that Arabanoo be returned to Manly Cove to show his people he was unharmed. He was escorted by longboat to the bay, and spoke in good humour with those gathered on the beach, telling them he was being kept at Warrane (Sydney Cove), and showing them the iron fetter on his leg. He was taken back again two days later, leaving a gift of birds, but this time seeing none of his people. The historian Thomas Keneally noted that Governor Phillip and the other colonists were "enchanted" by their captive, despite little progress in his learning English, and "though he was an honoured courtier and ambassador during the day, every night Arabanoo was locked in with his convict."

In April 1789 his fetters were removed. Arabanoo chose to stay at the British outpost and was often seen dressed in European clothes, drinking tea with a cup and saucer at the governor's residence.

Though Phillip's goal was one of improving relations with the Eora people, the kidnapping of Arabanoo did not do a great deal of good. Arabanoo did not learn English very quickly, "At least not to the point where he could make Phillip any wiser on the grievances of the natives." In any case, convicts later launched vigilante attacks on the Aboriginal people near Botany Bay, and smallpox, which was probably brought to Sydney by the colonists, caused a devastating epidemic throughout the Eora population.

== Smallpox ==
In April 1789, smallpox broke out amongst the Indigenous people around Sydney. No cases were reported among the European colonists, though one sailor, a Native American, caught the disease and died. Arabanoo was utilised by the colonists to look for survivors and was horrified when he approached the campsites which were either devoid of human life or filled with the putrid corpses of his people.

He is recorded as being "in silent agony for some time, at last he exclaimed 'All dead! All dead!' and then hung his head in mournful silence". Arabanoo later helped bring several of those found alive but sick back to a hut near the settlement's hospital. He helped nurse them, including a boy named Nanbaree and girl named Boorong. Soon after, Arabanoo himself displayed symptoms of the disease.

== Death ==
After six months amongst the settlers, Arabanoo died of smallpox, which he called gal-gal-la, on 18 May 1789. He was buried in the garden of the government building. Colonel David Collins said his death was "to the great regret of everyone who had witnessed how little of the savage was found in his manner, and how quickly he was substituting in its place a docile, affable, and truly amiable deportment".

== See also ==
- Australian Aboriginal culture
- History of Australia
- History of Australia (1788–1850)
- History of Indigenous Australians
- List of Indigenous Australian historical figures
