= Eora =

Aboriginal Australian nation of New South Wales

- aka: Ea-ora, Iora, and Yo-ra; Eora (AIATSIS), nd (SIL)
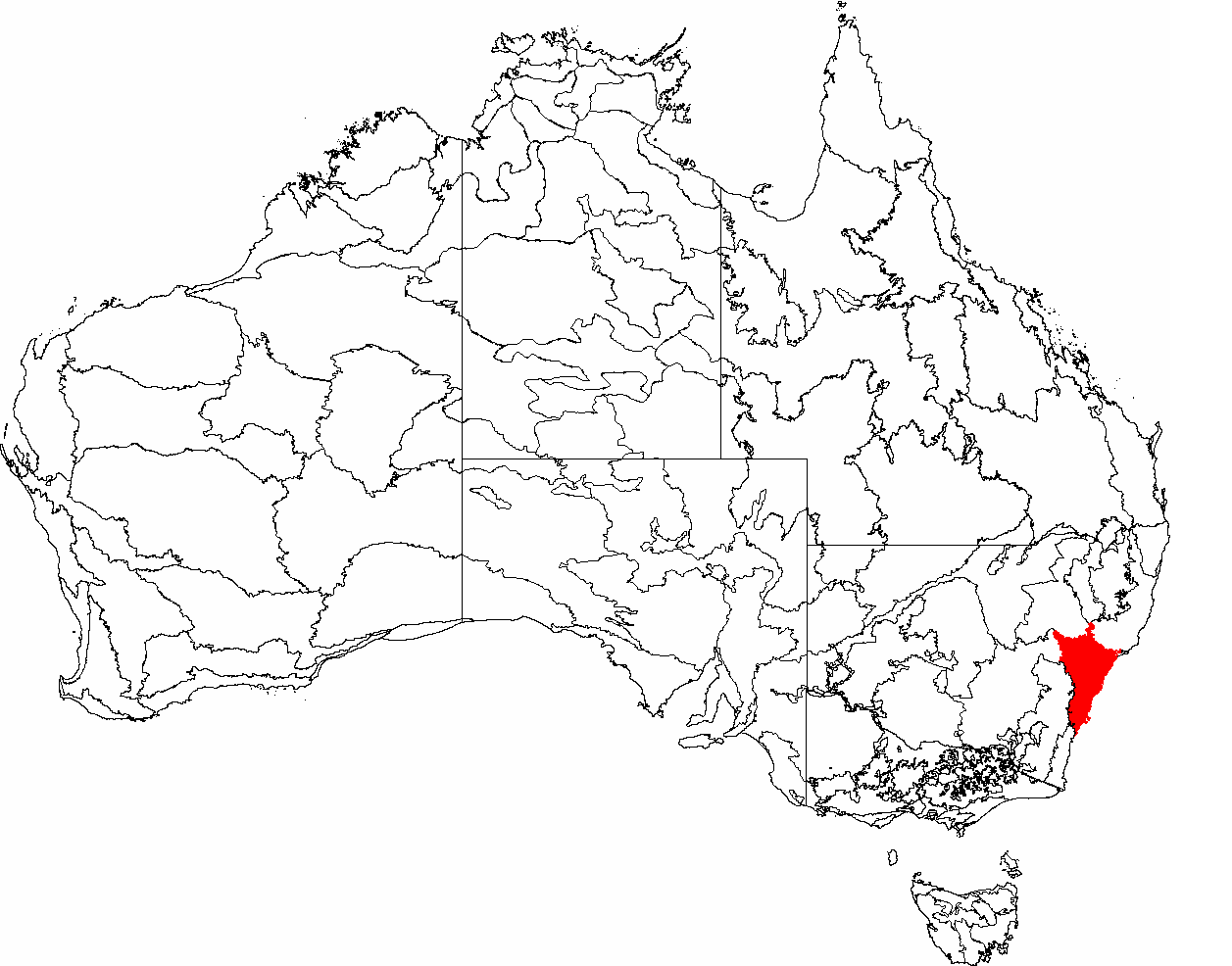
- Sydney Basin bioregion

Hierarchy
- Language family: Pama–Nyungan
- Language branch: Yuin–Kuric
- Language group: Yora (Eora)
- Group dialects: Dharug

Area
- Bioregion: Sydney Basin
- Location: Sydney
- Coordinates: 34°S 151°E

Notable individuals
- Bennelong; Barangaroo

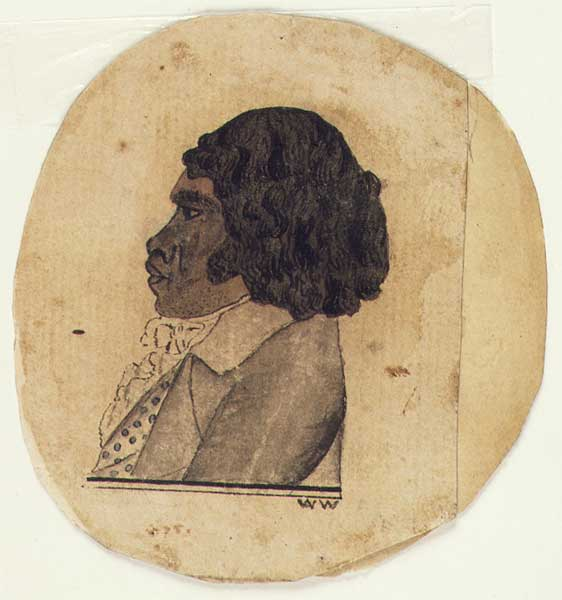
Portrait of Bennelong, a senior Wangal clansman of the Eora.

The Eora (/ˈjʊərə/; also Yura) are an Aboriginal Australian people of New South Wales. Eora is the name given by the early colonising British military officers (Note: "Neither the word lists nor the contexts in which eora is used in these early accounts suggest the word eora was associated with a specific group of people or a language.") to a group of Aboriginal people belonging to the clans along the coastal area of what is now known as the Sydney basin, in New South Wales, Australia. The Eora spoke a dialect of the language of the Darug people, whose traditional lands lie further inland within the Sydney basin, to the west of the Eora.

Contact with the first white settlement's bridgehead into Australia quickly devastated much of the population through epidemics of smallpox and other diseases. Descendants live on, though their traditions, languages, social system, and way of life are mostly lost.

Radiocarbon dating suggests human activity occurred in and around Sydney for at least 30,000 years, in the Upper Paleolithic period. However, numerous Aboriginal stone tools found in Sydney's far western suburbs gravel sediments were dated to be from 45,000 to 50,000 years BP, which would mean that humans could have been in the region earlier than thought.

== Ethnonym ==
The word "Eora" first appears in the Aboriginal wordlists recorded by First Fleet officers, where it was mostly translated as "men" or "people". The word has been used as an ethnonym by non-Aboriginal people since 1899, though there was "no evidence that Aboriginal people had used it in 1788 as the name of a language or group of people inhabiting the Sydney peninsula". Since the late 20th century, it has also come to be used as an ethnonym by Aboriginal people.

"Eora" in the wordlists of First Fleet officers
Source	Spelling	Translation
Dawes	Eeōra	Men, or people
Collins	Eo-ra	The name common for the natives
King	Eo-ra	Men or people
King	Yo-ra	A number of people
Southwell	E-ō-rǎh	People
Anon.	Eō-ra (or) E-ō-rāh	People

Collins's wordlist is the only original wordlist that does not translate the term as "men" or "people"; however, in the text of his Account, Collins uses the word to mean "black men", specifically in contrast to white men:

Conversing with Bennilong ... [I observed] that all the white men here came from England. I then asked him where the black men (or Eora) came from?

In The Sydney Language (1994), Troy respells the word "Eora" as yura and translates it as "people, or Aboriginal people". In addition to this entry for "people, or Aboriginal people", Troy also gives an entry for "non-Aboriginal person", for which she lists the terms wadyiman, djaraba, djibagalung, and barawalgal . The distinction between Aboriginal and non-Aboriginal people, observed by Troy and the primary sources, is also found in other Australian languages. For example, Giacon observes that Yuwaalaraay speakers used different lexical items for Aboriginal and non-Aboriginal persons: dhayn/yinarr for an Aboriginal man/woman, and wanda/wadjiin for a non-Aboriginal man/woman.

Whereas the primary sources, Troy, and Attenbrow only use the word "Eora" or its reference form yura in its original sense "people" or "Aboriginal people", from 1899 onwards non-Aboriginal authors start using the word as an ethnonym, in the sense "Aboriginal people of Sydney", despite the lack of evidence for this use. In two journal articles published in 1899, Wentworth-Bucknell and Thornton give "Ea-ora" as the name of the "tribe" who inhabited "Port Jackson" and "the Sydney district" respectively, and this definition appears to be copied directly in a 1908 wordlist. Attenbrow points out that none of these authors clarify the geographic area that they describe, and none state their source. Despite the lack of evidence for its use as an ethnonym, the word is used as such by Tindale (1974) in his Aboriginal Tribes of Australia, and Horton (1994) in his map of Aboriginal Australia in the Encyclopaedia of Aboriginal Australia, which has been widely circulated by AIATSIS.

Kohen proposes that "Eora" is derived from "e" meaning "yes" and "ora" meaning "country". Given that there is no primary evidence for the derivation of the word, this theory remains speculation. Contemporary linguistic analysis of the primary evidence does not support this theory either. The only primary source for the word "country", the anonymous vocabulary (ca. 1790–1792), records the word three times: twice with an initial nasal consonant (no-rār, we-ree norar), and only once with an initial vowel (warr-be-rong orah), although in that case it occurs immediately after a nasal consonant and almost certainly represents an inconsistency in transcription. Indeed, Troy gives an initial nasal consonant in her reference form nura for "place or country", which agrees with her and others' observation that "Australian languages do not usually have initial vowels".

Despite the lack of evidence for the use of the word "Eora" as an ethnonym, Aboriginal people in Sydney have also begun to use the word as such. For example, in the Metropolitan Local Aboriginal Land Council's Protocols for welcome to country and acknowledgement, the Council gives this example acknowledgement of country:

The Metropolitan Local Aboriginal Land Council and its members would like to acknowledge the traditional owners of the lands within our boundaries, the 29 clan groups of the Eora Nation. [...]

The dilemma in using terms "coined by 19th century anthropologists (e.g. Daruk) or modified from their original meaning (e.g. Eora)" is discussed at length by the Aboriginal Heritage Office:

There is a move away from using words like Eora, Dharug, Guringai among some of those involved but still a sense by others that these words now represent a part of Aboriginal culture in the 21st century. It seems clear that with each new piece of research the issue remains confusing with layer upon layer of interpretation based on the same lack of original information. This is exacerbated where writers make up names for their own problem-solving convenience. In the absence of factual evidence, it seems the temptation to fill the void with something else becomes very strong and this does not appear to be done in consultation with Aboriginal people who then inherit the problem.

== Language ==
The language spoken by the Eora has, since the time of R. H. Mathews, been called Dharug, which generally refers to what is known as the inland variety, as opposed to the coastal form Iyora (or Eora). It was described as "extremely grateful to the ear, being in many instances expressive and sonorous", by David Collins. It became extinct after the first two generations, and has been partially reconstructed in some general outlines from the many notes made of it by the original colonists, in particular from the notebooks of William Dawes, who picked up the languages spoken by the Eora from his companion Patyegarang.

Some of the words of Aboriginal language still in use today are from the Darug (also possibly Tharawal) language and include: dingo=dingu; woomera=wamara; boomerang=combining wamarang and bumarit, two sword-like fighting sticks; corroboree=garabara; wallaby, wombat, waratah, and boobook (owl). The Australian bush term bogey (to bathe) comes from a Port Jackson Dharuk root buugi-.

In December 2020, Olivia Fox sang a version of Australia's national anthem in Eora at Tri Nations Test match between Australia and Argentina.

=== Example words ===
- babunna (brother)
- beenèna (father)
- Berewalgal (people from far away)
- doorow (son)

== Country ==
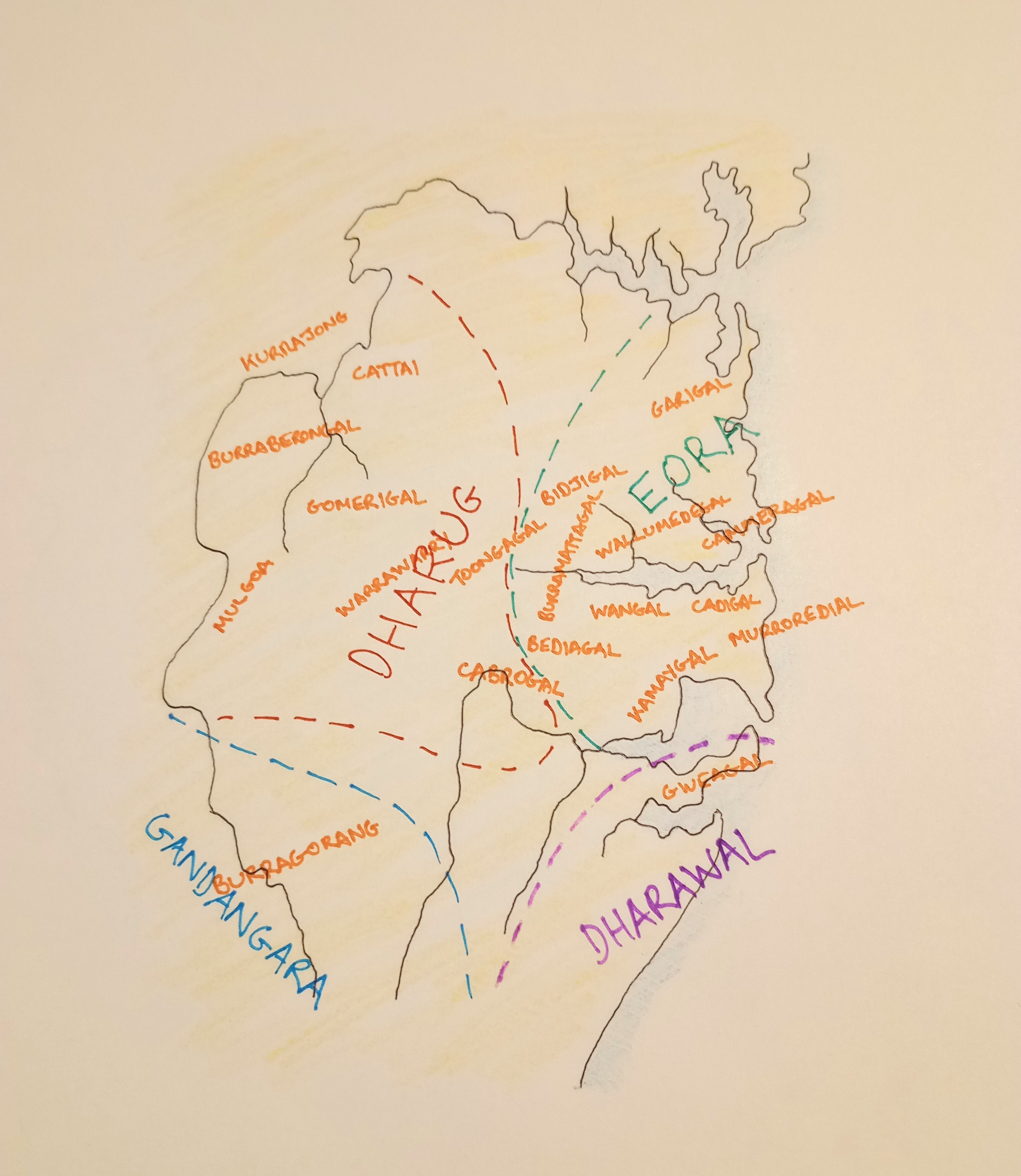
Map of the Indigenous clans of the Sydney region

Eora territory is composed of sandstone coastal outcrops and ridges, coves, mangrove swamps, creeks and tidal lagoons, was estimated by Norman Tindale to extend over some 700 square miles (1,800 km^{2}), from Port Jackson's northern shores up to the Hawkesbury River plateau's margins, around Pittwater. Its southern borders were as far as Botany Bay and the Georges River. Westwards it extended to Parramatta. In terms of tribal boundaries, the Kuringgai lay to the north: on the Western edges were the Darug; and to the south, around Kundul were the Gwiyagal, a northern clan of the Tharawal. Their clan identification, belonging to numerous groups of about 50 members, overrode more general Eora loyalties, according to Governor Phillip, a point first made by David Collins (Note: The natives of the coast, whenever speaking of those of the interior, constantly expressed themselves with contempt and marks of disapprobation. Their language was unknown to each other, and there was not any doubt of their living in a state of mutual distrust and enmity) and underlined decades later by a visiting Russian naval officer, Aleksey Rossiysky in 1814, who wrote:

each man considers his own community to be the best. When he chances to meet a fellow-countryman from another community, and if someone speaks well of the other man, he will invariably start to abuse him, saying that he is reputed to be a cannibal, robber, great coward and so forth.

== Clans ==
Eora is used specifically of the people around the first area of white settlement in Sydney. The generic term Eora generally is used with a wider denotation to embrace some 29 clans. The sizes of these clans could range from 20 to 60 but averaged around 50 members. -gal denominates the clan or extendeds family group affixed to the place name.

- Cammeraygal (Port Jackson, North Shore, Manly Cove)
- Wangal (south of the Parramatta River; Long Cove to Rose Hill)
- Gadigal (south side of Port Jackson) (Note: Their traditional land and watrs are south of Port Jackson, stretching from South Head to Petersham. The people described by British settlers as the Eora people were probably Cadigal people, the Aboriginal tribe of the inner Sydney region in 1788 at the time of first European settlement. The Cadigal clan western boundary is approximately the Balmain peninsula (Smith, Burke & Riley 2006).)
- Wallumettagal ("snapper fish clan". North of the Parramatta River. Milson Point, North Shore opposite Sydney Cove.)
- Burramattagal ("Eel place clan" = at the source of the Parramatta River)
- Bidjigal (Castle Hill)
- Kamaygal (northern shoreline of Botany Bay)
- Norongeragal (locality unknown)
- Borogegal (Bradley Head)
- Garigal (Broken Bay, or southern vicinity)

The Wangal, Wallumettagal and Burramattagal constituted the three Parramatta saltwater peoples. It has been suggested that these had a matrilineal pattern of descent.

== Lifestyle ==
The traditional Eora people were largely coastal dwellers and lived mainly from the produce of the sea. They were expert in close-to-shore navigation, fishing, cooking, and eating in the bays and harbours in their bark canoes. The Eora people did not grow or plant crops; although the women picked herbs which were used in herbal remedies. They made extensive use of rock shelters, many of which were later destroyed by settlers who mined them for their rich concentrations of phosphates, which were then used for manure. Wetland management was important: Queenscliff, Curl Curl and the Dee Why lagoons furnished abundant food, culled seasonally. Summer foods consisted of oyster, netted mullet caught in nets, with fat fish caught on a line and larger fish taken on burley and speared from rock ledges. As summer drew to an end, feasting on turtle was a prized occasion. In winter, one foraged for and hunted possum, echidna, fruit bats, wallaby and kangaroo.

The Eora placed a time limit on formal battles engaged to settle inter-tribal grievances. Such fights were regulated to begin late in the afternoon, and to cease shortly after twilight.

== History ==
When the colony was first established at Sydney Cove, the Eora were at first bewildered by settlers wreaking havoc on their trees and landscape. They were disconcerted by the suspicion these visitors were ghosts, whose sex was unknown, until the delight of recognition ensued when one sailor dropped his pants to clarify their perplexity. There were 17 encounters in the first month, as the Eora sought to defend their territorial and fishing rights. Misunderstandings were frequent: Governor Phillip mistook scarring on women's temples as proof of men's mistreatment, when it was a trace of mourning practices. From the outset, the colonizers kidnapped Eora to train them to be intermediaries between the settlers and the indigenous people. The first man to suffer this fate was the Guringai Arabanoo, who died soon after in the smallpox epidemic of 1789. (Note: Warren places this in the context of the struggle for scarce food resources:"Phillip sought to resolve these issues, but he probably made matters worse. In December, he sent marines out to capture some Aborigines, and several musquets were fired and rocks and spears were thrown. One native, Arabanoo, was captured. Shortly after, he was displayed in front of his home clan in a rather naïve effort to show them he was still alive." (Warren 2014b, p. 7)) Several months later, Bennelong and Colebee were captured for a similar purpose. Colebee escaped, but Bennelong stayed for several months, learning more about British food needs, etiquette, weaponry and hierarchy than anything the British garnered from conversing with him. Eventually Phillip built a brick house for Bennelong at the site of the present Sydney Opera House at Tubowgulle, (Bennelong Point). The hut was demolished five years later.

When the First Fleet of 1,300 convicts, guards, and administrators arrived in January 1788, the Eora numbered about 1,500. By early 1789 frequent remarks were made of great numbers of decomposed bodies of Eora natives which settlers and sailors came across on beaches, in coves and in the bays. Canoes, commonly seen being paddled around the harbor of Port Jackson, had disappeared. The Sydney natives called the disease that was wiping them out (gai-galla) and what was diagnosed as a smallpox epidemic in April 1789 effectively decimated the Port Jackson tribes. Robert King states that of an estimated 2,000 Eora, half (Bennelong's contemporary estimate) were decimated by the contagion. Smallpox and other introduced disease, together with starvation from the plundering of their fish resources, is said to have accounted for the virtual extinction of the 30–50 strong Cadigal clan on the peninsula (kattai) between Sydney Cove and South Head. J. L. Kohen estimates that between 50 and 90 percent of members of local tribes died during the first three years of settlement. No settler child showed any symptoms of the disease. The English rebuffed any responsibility for the epidemic. (Note: King cites from a contemporary Spanish report, "Examen politico de las colonias inglesas en el Mar Pacifico,":'Wary to avoid the accusation of this being the first fruit of their coming to these distant regions, the English allege in their favour that the epidemic manifested itself at almost the same time as their arrival, stating on the other hand legally that in all of the First Fleet there had not been anyone who had carried it; that they found it distinguished among the Natives with its own name; and that finally either this sickness was known before the coming of the Europeans, or that its introduction must have been brought by the French Ships of the Comte de la Perouse. It would be an idle rashness to wish now to entertain ourselves by examining this question: for our purpose it suffices to demonstrate that what will be easier and sooner will be the destruction rather than the civilisation of these unhappy people.' (King 1986, p. 54)) It has been suggested that either rogue convicts/settlers or the governing authority itself spread the smallpox when ammunition stocks ran low and muskets, when not faulty, proved inadequate to defend the outpost. It is known that several officers of the Fleet had experience of war in North America where using smallpox to diminish tribes had been used as early as 1763.

Several foreign reports, independent of English sources, such as those of Alexandro Malaspina in 1793 and Louis de Freycinet in 1802 give the impression that the settlers' relations with the Eora who survived the epidemic were generally amenable. Governor Phillip chose not to retaliate after he was speared by Willemering at Kayemai (Manly Cove) on 7 September 1790, in the presence of Bennelong who had, in the meantime, "gone bush". Governor William Bligh wrote in 1806: "Much has been said about the propriety of their being compelled to work as Slaves, but as I have ever considered them the real Proprietors of the Soil, I have never suffered any restraint whatever on these lines, or suffered any injury to be done to their persons or property."

Governor Macquarie established a Native Institution to house Aboriginal and also Māori children to civilize them, on the condition they could only be visited by their parents on one day, 28 December, a year. It proved a disaster, and many children died there. Aboriginal people continued to camp in central Sydney until they were evicted from their camps, such as the one at Circular Quay in the 1880s.

== Song ==
An Eora song has survived. It was sung by Bennelong and Yemmerrawanne at a concert in London in 1793. Their words and the music were transcribed by Edward Jones (Bardd y Brenin) and published in 1811. A modern version of the song was rendered by Clarence Slockee and Matthew Doyle at the State Library of NSW, August 2010, and may be heard online.

== Notable people ==
- Bennelong, a Wangal of the Eora peoples, served as a link between the British colony at Sydney and the Eora people in the early days of the colony. He was given a brick hut on what became known as Bennelong Point where the Sydney Opera House now stands. He travelled to England in 1792 along with Yemmerrawanne and returned to Sydney in 1795.
- Barangaroo, wife of Bennelong, was an important Cammeraygal woman from Sydney's early history who was a powerful and colourful figure in the colonisation of Australia. She is commemorated in the naming of the suburb of Barangaroo, on the eastern shore of Darling Harbour.
- Patyegarang, an Eora who taught her paramour William Dawes Eora languages
- Arabanoo, kidnapped by militia of the First Fleet to be trained as interpreter
- Pemulwuy, a Bidjigal clan warrior who led the Eora resistance for more than a decade
- Yemmerrawanne
- Tom Foster, a songwriter and boomerang expert

== Alternative names ==
- Bedia-mangora
- Cammeray, Cammera
- Ea-ora, Iora, Yo-ra
- Gouia
- Gouia-gul
- Gweagal (Eora horde on the south side of Botany Bay)
- Kadigal/Caddiegal (horde on south side of Port Jackson)
- Kameraigal (name of an Eora horde)
- Kem:arai (toponym of northern area of Port Jackson)
- Kemmaraigal Camera-gal, Camerray-gal, Kemmirai-gal
- Wanuwangul (Eora horde near Long Nose Point, Balmain, and Parramatta)

Source: Tindale 1974, p. 193

== See also ==
- History of Australia (1788–1850)

== Sources ==
- Anonymous (c. 1790). Vocabulary of the language of N.S. Wales in the neighbourhood of Sydney. (Native and English but not alphabetical). [unpublished manuscript]. p. 353.
- Attenbrow, Val (2010). Sydney's Aboriginal Past: Investigating the Archaeological and Historical Records. Sydney: UNSW Press. ISBN 978-1-74223-116-7.
- Barnes, Robert Winstanley (2009). An Unlikely Leader: The Life and Times of Captain John Hunter. Sydney University Press. ISBN 978-1-920-89919-6.
- Broome, Richard (2010). Aboriginal Australians: A History Since 1788. Allen & Unwin. ISBN 978-1-741-76554-0.
- Collins, David (1798). An Account of the English Colony in New South Wales. London: T.Cadell, W. Davies.
- Connor, John (2002). The Australian Frontier Wars, 1788–1838. University of New South Wales Press. ISBN 978-0-868-40756-2.
- Dawes, William. "The Aboriginal language of Sydney". Hans Rausing Endangered Languages Project, SOAS, Aboriginal Affairs NSW.
- Dawes, William (1790–1791). Vocabulary of the language of N.S. Wales, in the neighbourhood of Sydney, Native and English. [unpublished manuscript].
- Dixon, R. M. W. (1980). The Languages of Australia. Cambridge University Press. ISBN 978-0-521-29450-8.
- Dixon, R. M. W. (2011). Searching for Aboriginal Languages: Memoirs of a Field Worker. Cambridge University Press. ISBN 978-1-108-02504-1.
- Dosen, Anthony; Ballantyne, Tanya; Brumpton, Marcia; Gibson, Kim; Harris, Leon; Lippingwell, Stephen (2013). Investigating Legal Studies for Queensland. Cambridge University Press. ISBN 978-1-107-65346-7.
- Filling a void: a review of the historical context for the use of the word 'Guringai'. Sydney: Aboriginal Heritage Office. 2015. p. 40.
- Foley, Dennis (2007). "Leadership: the quandary of Aboriginal societies in crises, 1788 – 1830, and 1966". In Macfarlane, Ingereth; Hannah, Mark (eds.). Transgressions: Critical Australian Indigenous histories. Vol. 16. Australian National University Press. pp. 177–192. ISBN 978-1-921-31344-8. JSTOR j.ctt24hfb0.12.
- Fullagar, Kate (2015). "From Pawns to Players: Rewriting the Lives of Three Indigenous Go-Betweens". In Jackson, Will; Manktelow, Emily (eds.). Subverting Empire: Deviance and Disorder in the British Colonial World. Springer. pp. 22–42. ISBN 978-1-137-46587-0.
- Giacon, John (2020). Wiidhaa: an introduction to Gamilaraay. Canberra: ANU Press. p. 64. ISBN 978-1-76046-327-4.
- Heiss, Anita; Gibson, Melodie-Jane (2013). Aboriginal people and place. City of Sydney.
- Hinkson, Melinda (2002). "Exploring 'Aboriginal' sites in Sydney: a shifting politics of place?". Aboriginal History. 26: 62–77. JSTOR 24046048.
- Horton, David (1994). The encyclopedia of Aboriginal Australia. Australian Institute of Aboriginal and Torres Strait Islander Studies. OCLC 39026547.
- Hunter, John (1793). An Historical Journal of the Transactions at Port Jackson and Norfolk Island, ... including the journals of Governors Phillip and King, and of Lieut. Ball; ... London: John Stockdale.
- King, Robert J. (1986). "Eora and English at Port Jackson: A Spanish View" (PDF). Aboriginal History. 10 (1): 47–58.
- Kohen, James (1985). Aborigines in the West: Prehistory to present. Sydney: Western Sydney Project. p. 7. ISBN 0-949083-00-3.
- Macey, Richard (2007). "Settlers' history rewritten: go back 30,000 years". The Sydney Morning Herald.
- McGregor, William B. (2004). The Languages of the Kimberley, Western Australia. Abingdon: RoutledgeCurzon. p. 37. ISBN 0-415-30808-9.
- Meacham, Steve (20 September 2010). "Right back at us: Bennelong's song for 1793 London". The Sydney Morning Herald.
- "Protocols for welcome to country and acknowledgement" (PDF). Metropolitan Local Aboriginal Land Council. 2016.
- Smith, Keith Vincent (2005). "Tupaia's Sketchbook" (PDF). eBLJ. pp. 1–6.
- Smith, Keith Vincent (2009). "Bennelong among his people". Aboriginal History. 33: 7–30. JSTOR 24046821.
- Smith, Keith Vincent (2011). "1793: A Song of the Natives of New South Wales" (PDF). eBLJ. pp. 1–7. Archived from the original (PDF) on 14 February 2015.
- Smith, Keith Vincent; Burke, Anthony; Riley, Michael (June 2006). EORA: Mapping Aboriginal Sydney 1770–1850 (PDF). State Library of New South Wales. ISBN 0-7313-71615.
- Southwell, D (1788). "Extract of a copy of a letter from D. Southwell to the Rev. W. Butler, dated 12th July, 1788, from Sydney Cove, of which the original has not been preserved; and a list of words and an account". HR.NSW. 2: 696–704.
- "'Spine-tingling': Rugby viewers praise Australian national anthem sung in First Nations language". SBS News. 6 December 2020.
- Stockton, Eugene D.; Nanson, Gerald C. (April 2004). "Cranebrook Terrace Revisited". Archaeology in Oceania. 39 (1): 59–60. doi:10.1002/j.1834-4453.2004.tb00560.x. JSTOR 40387277.
- Thornton, G (1899). "Linguistics — Aboriginal names of places at Port Jackson and along the coast". Science of Man and Australasian Anthropological Journal. 11: 210–211.
- Tindale, Norman Barnett (1974). Aboriginal Tribes of Australia: Their Terrain, Environmental Controls, Distribution, Limits, and Proper Names. Australian National University Press. ISBN 978-0-708-10741-6.
- Troy, Jakelin (1992). "The Sydney Language Notebooks and responses to language contact in early colonial NSW" (PDF). Australian Journal of Linguistics. 12 (1): 145–170. doi:10.1080/07268609208599474.
- Troy, Jakelin (1994). The Sydney Language. Canberra. ISBN 0-646-110152.
- Warren, Chris (17 April 2014a). "Was Sydney's smallpox outbreak of 1789 an act of biological warfare against Aboriginal tribes?". ABC News. RN.
- Warren, Christopher (2014b). "Smallpox at Sydney Cove – who, when, why?". Journal of Australian Studies. 38 (1): 68–86. doi:10.1080/14443058.2013.849750. S2CID 143644513.
- Wentworth-Bucknell, W (1899). "A comparison of names in different languages". Science of Man and Australasian Anthropological Journal. 10: 195.
