= Yemmerrawanne =

18th-century Aboriginal Australian man

- Born: c. 1775; Australia
- Died: 18 May 1794 (aged 18–19); Eltham, England

Yemmerrawanne (c. 1775 - 18 May 1794) was a member of the Wangal clan, part of the Dharug people in the Port Jackson area at the time of the first British settlement in Australia, in 1788. Along with another Aboriginal man, Bennelong, he accompanied Governor Arthur Phillip when the latter returned to England in 1792–93. Yemmerrawanne did not return to Australia; he fell ill, died and was buried in England.

== In Australia ==
Yemmerrawanne was well-known to the British settlers; he was described by Captain Watkin Tench as a "good-tempered lively lad" who became "a great favourite with us, and almost constantly lived at the governor's house". Clothes were made for him, and he learnt to wait on the table.

In February 1791, aged about 16, Yemmerrawanne was initiated, as was the Aboriginal custom, by having a front tooth knocked out.

== Journey to England ==
In December 1792, Arthur Phillip left the colony on the convict transport ship Atlantic to return to England. Yemmerrawanne and Bennelong went with Phillip "voluntarily and cheerfully", knowing that their destination was "at a great distance". Atlantic called at Rio de Janeiro, where their presence was noted:

the said ship carried Arthur Filippe, the first Governor of that remote colony; this celebrated Officer, (well known for having served in the Portuguese Navy) among the many curiosities of animals and collections of the products of Nature, also brought two men from that new country, well proportioned, and in colour similar to the blacks, but with less curly hair; They were of a sweet nature, obliging to those who asked of them their dances and other strange gestures; and they had great facility in pronouncing Portuguese.

They arrived at Falmouth, Cornwall in May 1793.

== In England ==
After arriving in London, Yemmerrawanne and Bennelong were provided with fashionable clothing, suitable for wearing in English society. They stayed in Mayfair at the home of William Waterhouse, father of Henry Waterhouse, and visited a variety of shows and other entertainments in London. Tutors were hired to educate them in reading, writing and the English language.

While in Mayfair, Yemmerrawanne and Bennelong gave a recital of a native song accompanied by clapsticks. One of their audience, Edward Jones, wrote down and published the words and music (in Musical Curiosities, London, 1811), the oldest known published music from Australia.

== Illness and death ==
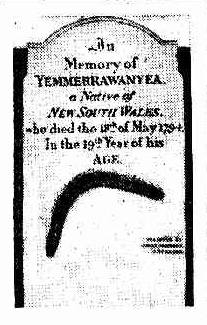
Yemmerrawanne's tombstone in a church yard in Eltham, Kent

In September 1793, Yemmerrawanne was ill and reportedly appeared "much emaciated". The following month he injured his leg, and his health continued to deteriorate. Both Aboriginal men were moved to Eltham, where Yemmerrawanne was treated by the physician Gilbert Blane. His illness persisted, despite a variety of treatments, and Yemmerrawanne died on 18 May 1794, aged about 19, from a lung infection. He was buried in the local churchyard.

There have been several campaigns, including plans by Burnum Burnum and Geoffrey Robertson, to return Yemmerrawanne's remains to Australia, but the current location of his remains is unknown. The gravestone's location is known, but it has been moved several times since his burial.

== Name variations ==
As is common with Aboriginal words, Yemmerrawanne's name has been recorded with several different spellings.

- Imeerawanyee, in Tench's A Complete Account of the Settlement at Port Jackson
- Yem-mer-ra-wan-nie, in David Collins' An Account of the English Colony of NSW
- Imerewanga, by Elizabeth Macarthur
- Yemmerawanya, in Phillip's letters
- Yemmurravonyea [sic] Kebarrah, in the Eltham parish register entry of his death. Kebarrah is an honorific indicating that he had been initiated by having his tooth knocked out.
- Yemmerrawanyea, on his gravestone
