= List of Indigenous Australian historical figures =

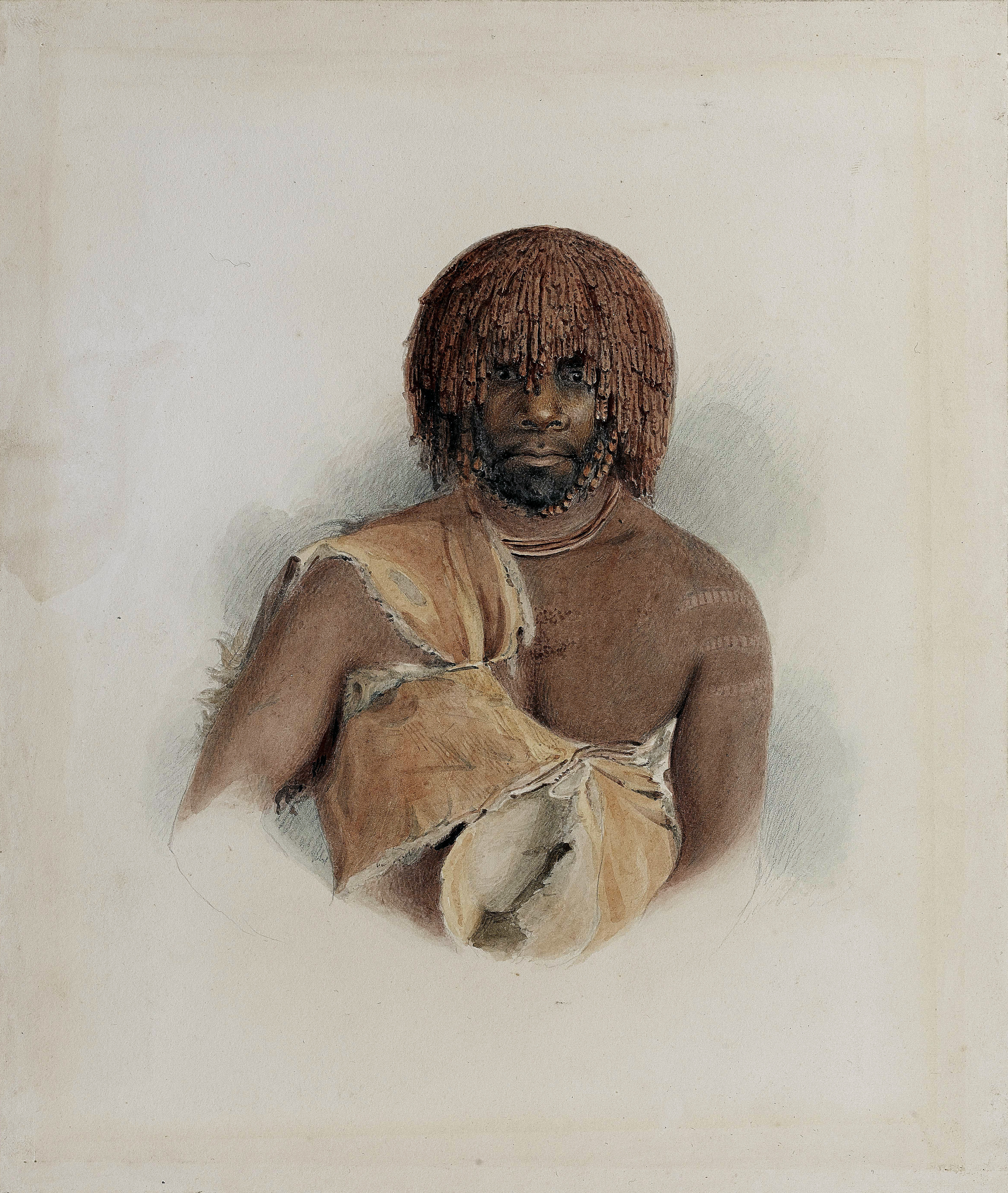
1835 painting of Woureddy by Thomas Bock

Some Indigenous Australians are remembered in history for their leadership during the British invasion and colonisation, some for their resistance to that colonisation, and others for assisting the Europeans in exploring the country. Some became infamous for their deeds, and others noted as the last of their communities. During the 20th century, some Indigenous Australians came to prominence to make significant contributions to Aboriginal human rights, land rights, to the armed services and to parliamentary representation.

== Prior to 1788 ==
- Cumbo Gunnerah – 18th century leader of the Kamilaroi people near Gunnedah, New South Wales

== 1788–1888 ==
- Arabanoo (c.1758–1789) Cammeraygal man forcibly abducted by the British to facilitate communication between the two groups
- Walter George Arthur (c.1820–1861) Indigenous Tasmanian survivor of the Black War and pioneering Aboriginal rights activist
- Ballandella (1832–1863) Wiradjuri girl taken by Sir Thomas Mitchell, who later became a notable member of the Hawkesbury River Aboriginal community
- William Barak (1824–1903) ngurungaeta of Wurundjeri, police tracker, then artist
- Barangaroo (c.1750–1791) prominent Cammeraygal woman during the first period of British colonisation
- Baulie (c.1835–1860) resistance leader and co-organiser of the Hornet Bank massacre
- Beilba (c.1825–1866) resistance leader and co-organiser of the Hornet Bank massacre
- Bennelong (c.1764–1813) representative of the Dharug people and pioneering interlocutor with the British
- Billiamook (c. 1853) Larrakia man and one of the first people to interact with white settlers in Garramilla (Darwin)
- Billibellary (1799–1846) ngurungaeta of the Wurundjeri-willam clan
- Biraban (c. 1800–1846) Awabakal man, who was employed by the British as an interpreter and interlocutor
- Biyarung (c. 1810–1888) Dharawal cultural leader, entrepreneur and tour guide
- Bob Barrett (c.1795–1833) Awabakal convict hunter
- Boorong (c.1777–c.1813) Burramattagal woman who was the first Indigenous female to establish communication with British colonists. Third wife of Bennelong
- Botany Bay Colebee (c. 1763–after 1790) Gweagal man who interacted with early colonists in Sydney
- Broger (c.1800–1830) a Dharawal outlaw
- Broughton (c.1798–c.1850) Dharawal explorer, guide and intermediary
- Harry Brown (1820–1854) Awabakal explorer who accompanied Ludwig Leichhardt
- Mary Ann Bugg (1834–1905) female Worimi bushranger who was intimately involved with the outlaw Captain Thunderbolt
- Bungaree (c.1775–1830) pioneering Awabakal sailor and explorer who travelled with Matthew Flinders and Phillip Parker King
- Burigon (died 1820) prominent Awabakal man whose murder resulted in the first legal case of a European being executed for the killing of an Aboriginal person.
- Calyute (c. 1833–1840) leader of the Pindjarup people at the time of the Battle of Pinjarra
- Johnny Campbell (1846–1880) Kabi man and bushranger
- Cannabaygal (c.1770–1816) Gandangara resistance leader who was killed during the Appin Massacre
- Thomas Chaseland (c.1800–1869) famous sailor and whaler who married a Maori woman and resided mostly in New Zealand
- Colebe (c.1754–1806) abducted with Bennelong by the British, later becoming an intermediator between the Gadigal and the colonists
- Colebee (Boorooberongal) (c.1800–1830s) Dharug man who worked with the British and obtained a land grant at Black's Town
- Mary Ann Coomindah (c.1865–1939) Karuwali/Mithaka woman who was a gdanja (herbalist), healer, smoke telegrapher and domestic servant. She was considered a polymath.
- Cora Gooseberry (c.1777–1852) wife of Bungaree and designated Aboriginal 'Queen of Sydney'
- Cowits (c.1832–1868) Western Australia's first Indigenous policeman, and a member of a number of early exploratory expeditions.
- Dalaipi (c.1795–c.1863) Turrbal leader and cultural knowledge keeper
- Derrimut (c.1810–1864) Bunurong elder during the British colonisation of Melbourne
- Dick-a-Dick (c.1834–1870) Wotjobaluk tracker and cricketer
- Dick Barkinji (?) explorer and guide who assisted in the Burke and Wills expedition
- Duall (c.1795–c.1840) Gandangara outlaw and explorer
- Dundalli (1820–1855) resistance leader in South East Queensland during European Settlement
- Eumarrah (c.1798–1832) Indigenous Tasmanian resistance leader and guide
- Joe Flick (c.1865–1889) Indigenous Australian outlaw who shot dead a Native Police officer
- Gajiyuma (?–1909) Marra man, Aboriginal elder and maritime pilot
- Gnunga Gnunga Murremurgan (c.1773–1809) Eora man who was the first Indigenous Australian to travel across the Pacific Ocean
- Kitty Hanley (c. 1845–1917) Wiradjuri matriarch and midwife
- Jackey Jackey (1833–1854) assisted Edmund Kennedy expedition into Cape York and awarded solid silver breastplate for heroic deeds.
- Jandamarra (c.1873–1897) – Bunuba man who resisted European occupation
- Kerwalli (c.1832–1900) Jagera headman and colonial Brisbane identity
- Kikatapula (c.1800–1832) Tasmanian Aboriginal resistance leader and guide
- Kudajarnd (c.1845–c.1905) Wakaya man and performer in the Wild Australia Show
- William Lanne (c.1835–1869) – also known as King Billy, last surviving male Aboriginal Tasmanian of unmixed heritage
- Maria Lock (c.1808–1878) – Boorooberongal Dharug student of the Native Institution who won first prize in the NSW examination for the year 1819
- Luggenemenener (c.1800–1837) Tasmanian Aboriginal woman who survived the Black War and was taken captive by John Batman who shot many of her people
- Tommy McRae (c.1835–1901) Wahgunyah man and artist
- Maggie of the Wando (c.1810–1853) Jardwadjali woman who guided the explorer Thomas Mitchell and survived a number of massacres.
- Mahroot (c.1795–1850) Kamaygal man from Botany Bay who successfully pioneered a lawsuit through the colonial British legal system and was a Sydney identity
- Major the Outlaw (c. late 1880s–1908) Wagiman man who was considered an 'Aboriginal outlaw' and bushranger.
- Mamitpa (c.1860s –1931) Iwaidja man who worked as a trepanger and boatman.
- Mannalargenna (c.1770–1835) Tasmanian Aboriginal leader of the Plangermaireener people
- Mathinna (c.1835–1852) Tasmanian Aboriginal girl who lived with Governor Franklin
- Maulboyheenner (c.1816–1842) Tasmanian Aboriginal resistance figure
- Robert Hobart May (c.1801–?) massacre survivor and first Aboriginal Tasmanian to be baptised and live in British colonial society
- Mildirn (c.1835–1918) Iwaidja-Garig leader and mariner who was kidnapped as a child and taken to Hong Kong
- Mokare (c.1800–1831) Noongar guide and peacemaker
- Montpelliatta (c.1790–1836) Aboriginal Tasmanian resistance leader
- Moorooboora (c.1758–1798) Eora leader after whom the suburb of Maroubra, New South Wales is named
- Moowattin (c.1791–1816) guide and assistant to the botanist George Caley. He was the first Aboriginal person to be legally hanged in New South Wales.
- Old Moppy (c.1787–c.1842) Yaggera leader, warrior and resistance fighter led the resistance in Moreton Bay
- Jupiter Mosman (1861–1945) discoverer of gold at Charters Towers, with Jupiters Casino being named in his honour
- Johnny Mullagh (1841–1891) Aboriginal cricketer who was known for his remarkable performance in the 1868 Aborigine cricket team's tour of England
- Mullawirraburka Kaurna leader preserving his language and culture during colonisation
- Multuggerah – resistance fighter of the Ugarapul nation from South East Queensland
- Musquito (c.1780–1825) resistance leader originally from Sydney, became a bushranger following transportation to Tasmania
- Nanbaree (c.1782–1821) Gadigal man who survived the smallpox epidemic as a child to become an important interpreter and sailor
- Nanya (c.1835–1895) one of the last Indigenous Australians to live a tribal traditional lifestyle in New South Wales
- Nora Hood (c. 1836–1871) Aboriginal Australian religious figure
- Patyegarang (c.1780–?) Cammeraygal girl who was the first to teach an Aboriginal Australian language in detail to the British
- Pemulwuy (c.1750–1802) member of the Dharug people (Botany Bay) area who had a leading role in resisting British colonisation
- Piper (c.1810–?) Wiradjuri explorer who guided Thomas Mitchell in his 1836 expedition
- Kitty Pluto (1877–1946) Kaanju woman who was a gold miner and prospector.
- Pluto (William Davis) (c.1869–1916) prospector and mining entrepreneur at the Batavia Goldfield.
- Pul Kanta (c.1815–?) Maraura man who survived the Rufus River massacre, gave evidence at a magisterial inquiry and later became a guide for Charles Sturt
- Fanny Cochrane Smith (1834–1905) first Tasmanian Aboriginal person born on Flinders Island
- Tanganutara (1805–1858) Palawa woman from Tasmania and mother of Fanny Cochrane Smith
- Tarenorerer (c.1800–1831) a female rebel leader of the Indigenous Australians in Tasmania. She led a guerrilla band against the British colonists during the Black War.
- Charley Tarra (c.1815–1847) Gandangara explorer who guided Paweł Strzelecki in his expedition across the Australian Alps and into Gippsland
- Tedbury (c.1780–1810) Aboriginal resistance fighter
- Emma Timbery (c.1842–1916) Dharawal upholder of culture
- Moses Tjalkabota (c.1869–1954) Western Arrernte man and evangelistst from the Hermannsburg region. He worked closely with Carl Strehlow and Ted Strehlow
- Tjintji-wara (c.1860–c.1950) Matuntara woman (Luritja) and leader of her people
- Tongerlongeter (c.1790–1837) Tasmanian Aboriginal resistance leader
- Toompani (c.1815–1886) Ngugi boatman from Moreton Island who helped save ten people from drowning in 1847
- Topar (1826–?) Barkandji man who led Charles Sturt into the Barrier Ranges, pioneering the establishment of Broken Hill
- Towterer (c.1800–1837) leading man of the Ninine people of south-western Tasmania whose daughter was Mathinna
- Truganini (c.1812–1876) last "full-blooded" Tasmanian Aboriginal person to have survived British colonisation
- Tullamareena (c.1820–?) also known as Tullamarine, a Wurundjeri man who burnt down Melbourne's first jail while escaping from it. The suburb of Tullamarine is named after him
- Tunnerminnerwait (c.1812–1842) Tasmanian Aboriginal Australian who acted as a guide for George Augustus Robinson and was executed for resisting British colonisation.
- Turandurey (c.1806–?) Wiradjuri woman who became a guide for the explorer Thomas Mitchell
- George Van Diemen (c.1812–1827) kidnapped Aboriginal Tasmanian boy who was probably the only Indigenous Tasmanian of unmixed heritage to visit England while living
- Wandi Wandi (c.1850–1893) Iwaidja resistance leader and outlaw from the Northern Territory
- Wild Toby (c.1840–1883) Aboriginal bushranger from central Queensland
- Willemering (c.1755–c.1800) Dharug man who speared Governor Arthur Phillip
- Winberri (c.1820–1840) Taungurung man who led an insurgency against the British in central Victoria and was killed during the Lettsom raid
- Tommy Windich (c.1840–1876) Western Australian Indigenous explorer
- Windradyne (c.1800–1829) Wiradjuri man, also known as "Saturday", a notable figure of the Aboriginal resistance during the Bathurst War
- Simon Wonga (1824–1874) ngurungaeta of the Wurundjeri people around Melbourne who secured land at Coranderrk, and the suburb Wonga Park was named after him
- Woretemoeteryenner (c.1795–1847) Tasmanian Aboriginal woman and sealer
- Woureddy (c.1790–1842) Aboriginal Tasmanian warrior and cleverman
- Wylie (c.1825–?) Aboriginal guide who stayed with Edward John Eyre in their crossing of the Nullarbor
- Yagan (c.1795–1833) Western Australian Indigenous leader of the 1830s
- Yarramundi (c.1760–c.1819) prominent Dharug man, also a karadji
- Yarri (c.1810–1880) famous flood rescuer from Gundagai
- Yemmerrawanne (c. 1775–1794) Dharug man who, along with Bennelong, was the first Aboriginal person to travel to England
- Yilbung (c.1815–1846) Turrbal man who actively resisted British colonisation in the Brisbane region
- Moses Yoolpee (c.1865–1940) Karuwali–Mithaka elder, stockman and tracker/translator
- Yuranigh (c.1820–1850) provided vital assistance to Thomas Mitchell's 1845 expedition. Highly honoured by the Wiradjuri

== 1888 onwards ==
- Alurrpa Pananga (c.1870–c.1940) Eastern Arrernte and Wangkangurru man and a leader of his people
- Alyandabu (c.1874–1961) Kungarakany woman and senior elder (Almiyuk).
- Undelya (Minnie) Apma (c.1909–1990) Arrernte woman from Horseshoe Bend Station who worked as a domestic servant for Herbert Basedow
- Ayaiga (c.1882–1952) also known as 'Neighbor', was an Alawa man who was the first Indigenous person to receive the Albert Medal for Lifesaving
- Dolly Gurinyi Batcho (c.1905–1973) Larrakia woman who served on Aboriginal Women's Hygiene Squad, 69th, as a part of the Australian Women's Army Service. She was also a signatory of the 1972 Larrakia Petition
- Beetaloo Jangari Bill (c.1910–1983) Gurindji and Warumungu Elder from Elliott, Northern Territory.
- David Burrumarra (1917–1994) Yolŋu man who was a philosopher, diplomat and leader
- Richard (Dick) Butler (1908–1987) Wugularri/Jawoyn sportsman, soldier and gardener from the Northern Territory
- Jimmy Clements (c.1847–1927) pioneering Wiradjuri Aboriginal rights campaigner
- William Cooper (c.1861–1941) political activist and community leader, first to lead a recognised national Aboriginal movement
- Joseph (Joe) Croft (c. 1925–1996) Gurindji and Mudburra man who was a member of the Stolen Generations and went on to become the first Aboriginal person to attend an Australian university
- Barbara Cummings (1948–2019) Nanggiomeri woman and member of the Stolen Generations and she was instrumental to the development of the Bringing Them Home report
- Hobbles Danayarri (1925–1988) Mudburra lawman and community leader who was involved in the Wave Hill walk-off
- Dexter Daniels (c. 1938–1999) Numamurdirdi (Yugul Mangi) man, union organiser and pioneering Aboriginal activist
- Billy Drumley (1853–1951) community leader
- Bill Dunn (c. 1911– ) involved in the Pilbara Strike, and the first Aboriginal man to be granted a pastoral lease in Western Australia.
- Charlie Flannigan (c. 1870–1893) stockman, artist and first person legally executed in the Northern Territory
- Nellie Flynn (1881–1982) Aboriginal and Māori woman who was the matriarch of her family and a community elder around Batchelor, Northern Territory
- Kapiu Masi Gagai (c. 1894–1946) pearler, boatman, mission worker and soldier who served in World War II.
- Rona Glynn (1936–1965) first Indigenous Australian school teacher and nurse in Mparntwe (Alice Springs)
- Tommy Governor father of Jimmy Governor, and discoverer of a lead-silver ore deposit at Leadville, NSW
- Jimmy Governor (c. 1875–1901) famous outlaw with his brother Joe Governor
- Donald Jupurrula Graham (c.1920–1989) Warumungu man and collaborator with researchers regarding the Warumungu language and culture. He was also the first person to be recorded speaking the Warlmanpa language.
- Douglas Grant (1885–1951) massacre survivor and soldier for the AIF during WWI
- Nipper Kabirriki (c.1910–1987) Kundjey'mi man and stockman and research collaborator; he was instrumental to the establishment of Kakadu National Park
- Doreen Kartinyeri (1935–2007) Ngarrindjeri historian and activist who had a key role in the Hindmarsh Island Bridge controversy
- Alec Kruger (1924–2015) Mudburra man and member of the Stolen Generations for which he unsuccessfully sued the government for compensation. He is the author of 'Alone on the Soaks' (2007)
- Amelia Kunoth (c. 1880s–1984) Arrernte woman who grew up at the Alice Springs Telegraph Station and went on the develop numerous Central Australian cattle stations
- Lazarus Lamilami (1908–1977) Maung man and Methodist preacher
- Gloria Ouida Lee (1908–1995) Chinese and Western Arrernte woman who worked as a miner
- Vincent Lingiari (1908 or 1919–1988) prominent Australian Aboriginal rights activist
- Maurice Jupurrurla Luther (c. 1945–1985) Warlpiri man and leader of the community of Lajamanu, Northern Territory
- Eddie Mabo (1936–1992) iconic Indigenous Australian man from the Torres Strait Islands known for successfully championing Indigenous land rights into Australian law
- Joe McGinness (1914–2003) Larrakia and Kungarakany man and Aboriginal rights activist
- Val McGinness (1910—1988) Larrakia and Kungarakany man and Aboriginal rights activist
- Cissy McLeod (1896–1928) first Indigenous woman to receive a bronze medal from the Royal Humane Society an act of bravery in Darwin
- Mijanu (c.1900–1978) stockman and police tracker from the Newcastle Waters region of the Northern Territory
- Minyana Tjakamara (c.1882–1969) Warlpiri leader and Elder
- Ben Murray (1893–1994) Afghan/Arabana/Thirari man who worked as a stockman, cameleer, linguist and story teller.
- Nayombolmi (c.1895–1967) Badmardi (Bininj) and Jawoyn man who was a rock artist and bark painter
- Nemarluk (c.1911–1940) leader of the Chul-a-mar, who fought European and Japanese around Darwin in the early 20th century
- Douglas Nicholls (1906–1988) first Aboriginal Australian to be knighted and hold a vice-regal office
- George John Noble (c.1840s–1928) pioneering Wiradjuri Aboriginal rights figure
- Jack Patten (1905–1957) civil rights activist, journalist and led some of the first organised Aboriginal protests
- Charles Perkins (1936–2000) pioneering Indigenous activist, sportsman and academic
- Hetty Perkins (c.1895–1979) Eastern Arrernte elder who worked for The Bungalow; she is the mother of Charles Perkins
- John 'Jacky' Owen Aboriginal prospector, who discovered quartz reef gold at Gilgunnia and copper ore at Shuttleton
- Reg Saunders (1920–1990) first Aboriginal Australian to be commissioned as an officer in the Australian Army
- Ray Raiwala (c.1907–1965) Yolngu man who worked with anthropologist Donald Thomson.
- Bob Randall (c.1934–2015) Yankunytjatjara man and member of the Stolen Generations who became an advocate for his community and a well-respected elder
- Silas Ngulati Roberts (1925–1983) Alawa man and Methodist lay preacher and a leader of his people.
- Katie Rodriguez (1920–1994) Nyigina woman who became a Catholic novice and later a cook, domestic and manager of pastoral stations.
- Darby Jampijinpa Ross (c. 1905–2005) Warlpiri man who became a well-known artist for Warlukurlangu Artists and often referred to as one of the last 'old people' at Yuendumu
- Daisy Ruddick (1915–2002) Gurindji woman and member of the Stolen Generations
- Marion Leane Smith (c.1891–1957) First World War nurse
- Tiger Tjalkalyirri (c.1906–1985) Pitjantjatjara man who was a guide, Elder and land-rights campaigner for Uluṟu-Kata Tjuṯa National Park
- Matthias Ulungura (1921–1980) Tiwi Islander who during WWII captured the first Japanese prisoner of war on Australian territory
- Umbarra (died 1904) late 19th century elder of the Yuin around Bermagui, New South Wales
- David Unaipon or David Ngunaitponi (1872–1967) Ngarrindjeri preacher, inventor, and author, who is featured on the Australian $50 note
- Sentah Sonny Leo Unmeopa (1944–1996) Torres Strait Islander activist
- Fred Nadpur Waters (c.1900–1958) Larrakia man who led a series of strikes by Aboriginal known as the Corroboree Strikes, (1950 to 1951)
- Len Waters (1924–1993) first Aboriginal Australian military aviator, and the only one to serve as a pilot for the RAAF during WWII
- Ronnie Wavehill (c.1936–2020) Gurindji stockman from Wave Hill Station who took part in the Wave Hill walk-of
- Nipper Winmarti (c.1920–1993) Pitjantjatjara man and Traditional Owner of Uluṟu-Kata Tjuṯa National Park. He worked as a tracker and provided evidence at the inquest into the Death of Azaria Chamberlain.
- Dhakiyarr Wirrpanda (c.1900–c.1934) Dhay'yi and Yolngu man accused of murder whose sentence was overturned by the High Court of Australia in Tuckiar v The King. He then disappeared, with foul play suspected, after his release.
- Yoolya (c.1899 – 4 July 1967) Nyigina man who was taken from his home to Drysdale River Mission and raised in the catholic church
- Yukun (Yokununna) (c.1905–1934) Anangu Pitjantjatjara man who was killed by police at Ayers Rock (Uluru)
