= George John Noble =

Aboriginal elder from the Wiradjuri tribe in Australia

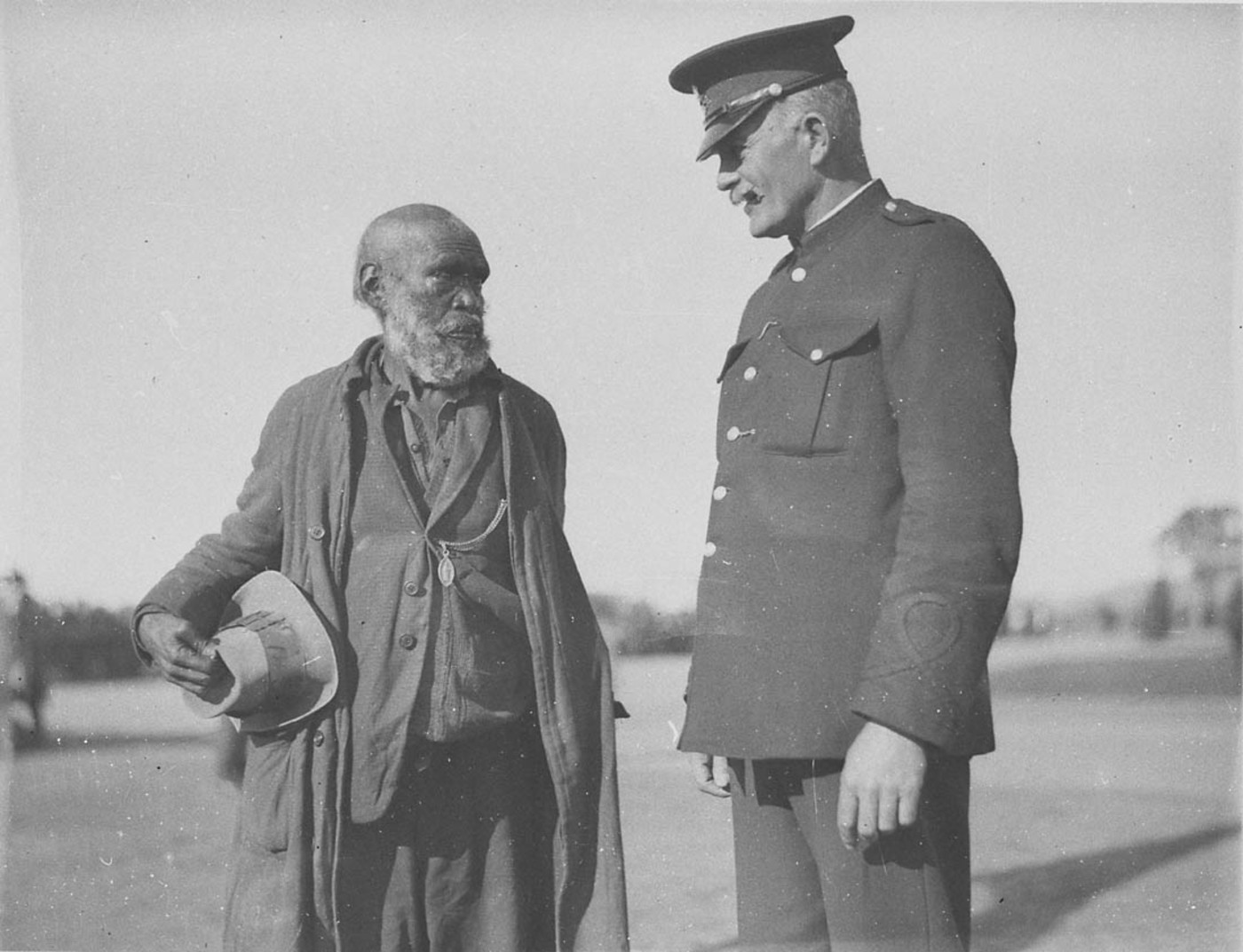
- George Noble (left) at the opening of Parliament House in May 1927
- Born: c. 1840s Muttama, New South Wales
- Died: 27 March 1928; Cootamundra, New South Wales, Australia
- Other names: Ooloogan; Marvellous
- Spouse: Ada Curran (1896–1909)
- Children: 7

George John Noble (c. 1840s – 27 March 1928) was an Aboriginal elder from the Wiradjuri tribe in Australia. He was born at Muttama Station in New South Wales and lived intermittently at Gundagai while travelling across the Riverina, the Central and Southern Tablelands, the South Coast and Greater Sydney regions. Noble obtained the nickname Marvellous due to his regular use of the word in conversation.

Along with fellow Wiradjuri elder Jimmy Clements, Noble walked from the Brungle Mission, near Gundagai, to Canberra to attend the opening of the Provisional Parliament House in May 1927. They were the only Aboriginal representatives at the event, with the intent of demonstrating their sovereign rights on behalf of their people.

Noble was found in a serious condition in Cootamundra in early March 1928 and was taken to Cootamundra District Hospital. He died on 27 March and was buried in the Roman Catholic section of the Cootamundra Cemetery.

== See also ==
- List of Indigenous Australian historical figures
