= Deborah Rose =

Deborah Rose may refer to:

- Deborah Bird Rose (1946–2018), Australia-based ethnographer
- Debi Rose (born 1951), member of the New York City Council
