= Colebee (disambiguation) =

Colebee or Colebe may refer to:

- Colebe (c. 1754 – after 1806), Aboriginal Australian of the Gadigal people, who was abducted with Bennelong in 1789
- Botany Bay Colebee (c. 1763 – after 1790), Gweagal man of the Dharawal people, namesake of the above person
- Colebee (Boorooberongal) (c.1800 – 1830), Boorooberongal man of the Dharug people, associated with Nurragingy
