= Matuntara people =

The Matuntara are an Indigenous Australian people of the Northern Territory.

== Language ==
Though called "Southern Luritja", the Matuntara seems to have been Antakarinya.

== Country ==
Norman Tindale estimated the Matuntara tribal lands to cover approximately 14,000 square miles (36,000 km^{2}). Their nomadic lives were spent south of the Levi Range around the Palmer River tributary of the Finke River. Their eastern extension ran over to Erldunda, while their westerly boundary lay at Curtin Springs. Their lands extended across what is now the state border, into South Australia.

Their neighbours to the south were the Antakirinja. Their neighbours to the northwest were the Gugadja, with whom they are sometimes confused, being considered by some early explorers to have been a southern horde of the latter.

== History ==
Some time around the turn of the 19th and 20th centuries, the Matuntara absorbed a branch of the Pitjantjatjara known as the Maiulatara clan, when the latter migrated eastwards to Tempe Downs from their grounds that lay to the north of the Petermann Range.

A notable Matuntara person is Tjintji-wara, who was a leader of her people.

== Alternative names ==
- Matutara
- Matjutu
- Maduntara (pejorative Pitjantjatjara exonym)
- Madutara, Maiulatara (Antakirinja and Yankuntjatjarra) (Note: These were, according to Tindale, usesd to refer to a clan of the Pitjantjatjara which had melted into the Matuntara tribe.)
- Maiuladjara
- Southern Loritja
- Aluna (Pitjantjatjara name for those who spoke the Matuntara language)
- Ku'dadji (Again a Pitjantjatjara term distinguishing them from the Mangawara)

== Sources ==
- "AIATSIS map of Indigenous Australia". AIATSIS. 28 July 2023.
- Planert, Wilhelm; Strehlow, Carl (1908). "Einige Bemerkungen über die von Dr. Planert auf Grund der Forschungen des MissionarsWettengel veröffentlichte Aranda-Grammatik". Zeitschrift für Ethnologie (in German). 40 (5): 698–703. JSTOR 23030339.
- Róheim, Géza (January–June 1933). "Women and Their Life in Central Australia". Journal of the Royal Anthropological Institute of Great Britain and Ireland. 63: 207–265. doi:10.2307/2843917. JSTOR 2843917.
- Strehlow, Carl (1907). von Leonhardi, Moritz (ed.). Die Aranda- und Loritja-stämme in Zentral-Australien (PDF) (in German). Frankfurt am Main: Städtisches Völker-Museum.
- Tindale, Norman Barnett (1974). "Matuntara (NT)". Aboriginal Tribes of Australia: Their Terrain, Environmental Controls, Distribution, Limits, and Proper Names. Australian National University. ISBN 978-0-708-10741-6. Archived from the original on 20 March 2020.
