= Gnunga Gnunga Murremurgan =

Pioneering Indigenous Australian sailor

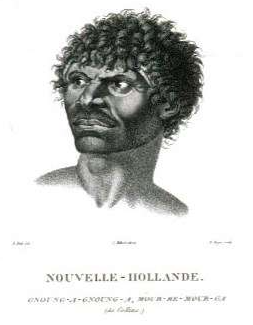
Portrait of Gnunga Gnunga Murremurgan by Nicolas-Martin Petit

Gnunga Gnunga Murremurgan (c.1773 – 12 January 1809), also known as Collins, was an Eora man who, in 1793–1794, was the first Indigenous Australian to travel across the Pacific Ocean, visiting Yuquot, California and Hawai'i as part of Captain George Vancouver's Pacific expedition.

== Friendship with David Collins ==
Gnunga Gnunga first made contact with the British at the nascent military outpost of Sydney in November 1790. He immediately made a good impression on the colonists who regarded him as having an agreeable and gentle disposition. The Judge Advocate of New South Wales, David Collins, held him in particular esteem and gave him his own name of Collins, which Gnunga Gnunga readily adopted.

== Voyage to America ==
In April 1793, the storeship Daedalus under the command of Lieutenant James Hanson, arrived in Sydney with orders to resupply the expedition of Captain George Vancouver which was stationed on the west coast of America. Daedalus was short of crew and the Lieutenant Governor of New South Wales, Major Francis Grose, ordered that Gnunga Gnunga join the vessel so that he could more fully learn the English language, and that if he survived the voyage, he was to be brought back "safe to his friends and countrymen".

Despite Gnunga Gnunga having a pregnant wife, Warreweer who was the sister of Bennelong, he happily boarded Daedalus on its voyage which left in early July 1793.

Daedalus sailed across the Pacific Ocean to its agreed rendezvous point with the Vancouver expedition at Friendly Cove on Nootka Island which is now part of Canada. They arrived on 8 October 1793, but had missed Vancouver who had sailed south. After a few days at Nootka, the vessel journeyed south where they met with Vancouver's ships anchored off the Californian coast near San Francisco in late October.

Vancouver's expedition involved negotiations with the Spanish Empire over ownership of the ports on the west coast of America and his expedition was often denied full access to these ports. However, at the Presidio of Santa Barbara, his fleet was given open access and the crew, including Gnunga Gnunga, were allowed recreation at the settlement as long as they were back onboard their ships by nightfall. A large population of Indigenous Californians was located at a nearby mission and village, and these people regularly interacted with the crew of Vancouver's fleet. Vancouver wrote that they had an "extremely pleasant" week at Santa Barbara.

After departing Santa Barbara, the Vancouver expedition continued south, briefly visiting the Mission San Buenaventura, the Presidio of San Diego and northern Baja California. However, under instructions to return Daedalus to Sydney with provisions for that settlement, Vancouver abandoned further southerly exploration and decided to sail his fleet to Hawai'i.

== Hawai'i ==
Vancouver's expedition arrived at Hawai'i in January 1794 where they were warmly greeted by Kamehameha the Great and provided with supplies. While there, Gnunga Gnunga conducted himself with "the greatest propriety" and did not incur "the dislike or ill-will of any person on board the ship". Like the other sailors, he "discovered that favours from the females were to be procured at the easy exchange of a looking-glass, a nail, or a knife, he was not backward in presenting his little offering, and was as well received as any of the white people in the ship".

Kamehameha was very impressed with Gnunga Gnunga and "earnestly wished to detain him on the island, making splendid offers to Mr. Hanson, of canoes, warlike instruments, and other curiosities, to purchase him". But Gnunga Gnunga was anxious to return to New South Wales and Lieutenant Hanson had promised Major Grose that he would be returned.

While at Hawai'i, Gnunga Gnunga would have witnessed the negotiations between Vancouver and Kamehameha to cede Hawai'i to the British Empire, which was completed in late February. He also would have observed the execution of three O'ahu men for the killing in 1792 of Lieutenant Richard Hergest and William Gooch, former officers of Daedalus.

== Return to New South Wales ==
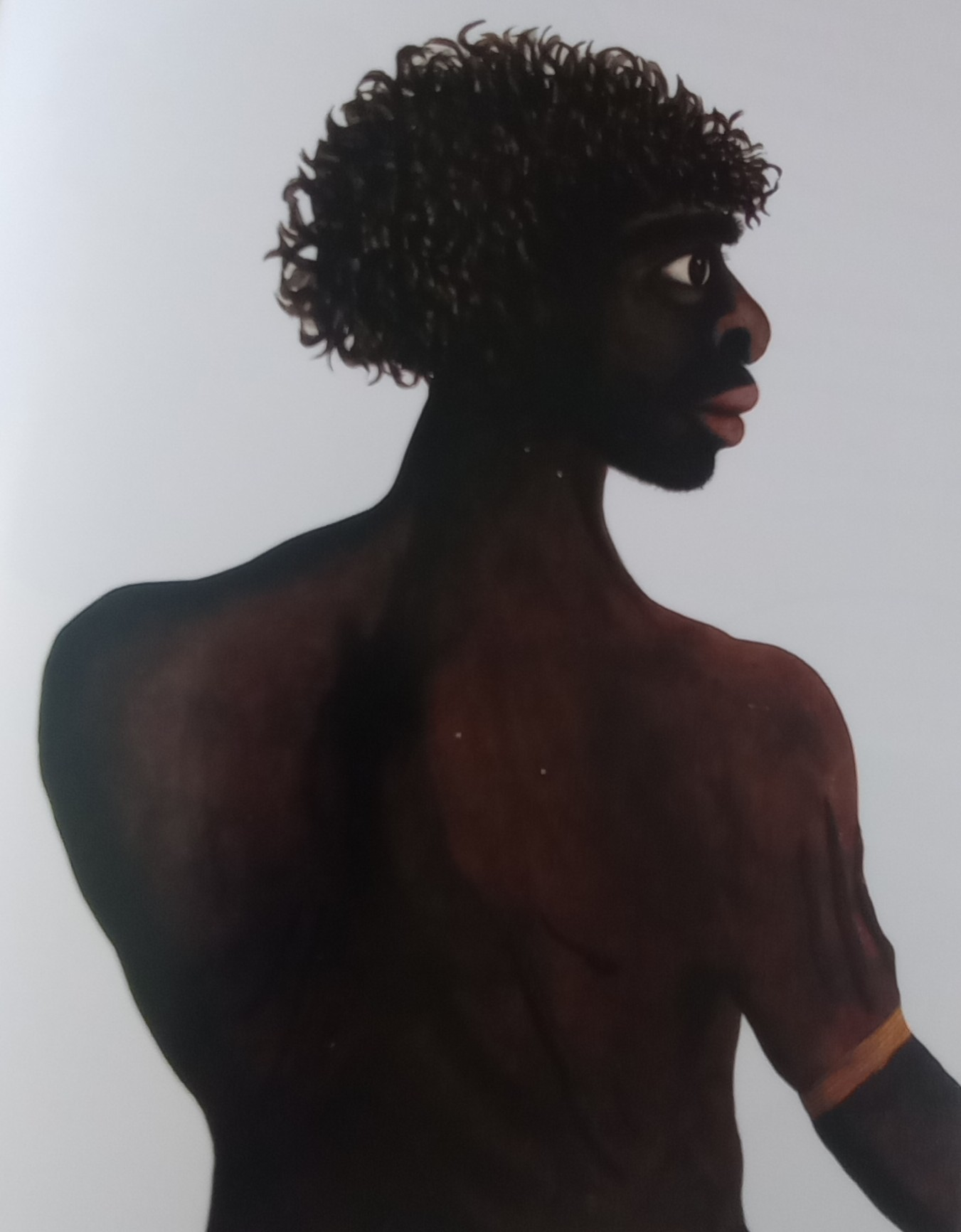
Portrait of Gnunga Gnunga (Collins) by Thomas Watling

The fully supplied Daedalus under the command of Lieutenant Hanson, left Hawai'i in February 1794 with Gnunga Gnunga on board bound for New South Wales. After stopping at Norfolk Island, the vessel arrived in Sydney in April 1794.

On his arrival at Sydney, it was found that Gnunga Gnunga did not acquire much English during the voyage. He did find out, however, that his wife had given birth to their daughter (who soon after died in early infancy) but had also acquired a new husband, an Aboriginal man named Wyatt. In a ritual contest, Gnunga Gnunga wounded Wyatt with a spear and thus Warreweer "became the prize of the victor".

In December 1795, Gnunga Gnunga fought another ritual battle in Sydney, this time with the Bidjigal warrior, Pemulwuy. Gnunga Gnunga lost this contest and received a barbed spear in "his loins close by the vertebrae of the back". British surgeons could not remove the spear and for several weeks he was seen "walking about with the spear unmoved". His wife, Warreeweer, later apparently dislodged the barbed tip with her teeth and although Gnunga Gnunga recovered, the incident left him disabled for the rest of his life.

== Death and legacy ==
On 12 January 1809, Gnunga Gnunga was found dead behind the Dry Store (present day Macquarie Place Park in Sydney), the cause of death believed to be related to his injuries inflicted by Pemulwuy.

He was remembered "for the docility of his temper, and the high estimation in which he was universally held among the native tribes, he had extended to many an orphan a fostering hand, and, as his own children, provided for their infant wants". Gnunga Gnunga was also "much esteemed by every white man who knew him, as well on account of his personal bravery, of which we had witnessed many distinguishing proofs, as on account of a gentleness of manners which strongly marked his disposition".

Two visual representations of Gnunga Gnunga made during his lifetime are known to exist. One is a painting by convict artist Thomas Watling and the other is an engraving created by French artist Nicolas-Martin Petit who visited Sydney in 1802.

== See also ==
- List of Indigenous Australian historical figures
