= George Van Diemen =

Indigenous Tasmanian traveller to England

George Van Diemen (c.1812 – 3 December 1827), also known as George Vandiemen, was a Tasmanian Aboriginal boy who was acquired by the Lieutenant-Governor of Van Diemen's Land, William Sorell in 1819 and later sent to England to be educated under the British system. He appears to have been the first and only documented Indigenous Tasmanian of unmixed heritage to visit England while alive.

== Early life ==
George was born around the year 1812 close to what is now known as the locality of New Norfolk in Tasmania. His parents were Indigenous Tasmanians who were still living a mostly traditional Aboriginal lifestyle despite the increasing presence of British colonists taking their lands and killing their people. It is not known what George's traditional name was.

== Taken by the British ==
In early 1819, convict servants of British colonists working in the Plenty River region, encountered a group of Aborigines. This "sudden interruption" caused the Aboriginal people to flee and two Indigenous children were subsequently captured by the convicts. One of these children was George, aged around seven, and the other was a much younger child who died not long after being captured.

== Placed in the household of William Sorell ==
George was taken to Hobart, where the Lieutenant-Governor, William Sorell, took an interest in his welfare and placed him under his care. Sorell had him baptised and named as George Van Diemen. George would have been traumatised by the experience of being displaced from his family, seeing at least one close relative die, and being placed in a completely alien environment. However, according to Sorell he adapted well to British expectations by:

"been taught his letters and his prayers and...has become obedient and tractable and is weaned from his wandering habits"

== Sent to England for education ==
In 1821, Sorell decided to attempt an "experiment of instructing and civilizing a being of a race so little known" by sending George to England to be educated. He placed George in the care of a Liverpool merchant named William Kermode with whom he instructed to "leave George...in any hands that you may consider fit to ensure his good treatment and education".

In September 1821, George, then aged around nine, sailed with Kermode for England on board the small trading vessel Mary. After a long journey of approximately twelve months, they reached Liverpool where George's arrival was described in the local newspaper as an "object of curiosity". Further Liverpool news reports went on to state that George could be

"seen at Mr Kermode's...he is, in our opinion deserving of the countenance of the benevolent and humane. The land of his birth is at present uncilivized but the education of a few of its natives...will be the most effectual means of reclaiming the whole native population from the state of barbarism in which they are now sunk"

Soon after arriving in Liverpool, George was transferred from Kermode's care and sent to the nearby village of Southport to be educated under the patronage of Reverend George Greatbatch. Greatbatch was surprised by the child's affection and gratitude as he previously thought his race was unable to display such feelings. By 1823, George was able to write brief letters in English to Lieutenant-Governor Sorell, was receptive to instruction and became well-liked within the Southport community.

In 1825, George's encouraging progress saw him transferred for further education to the residence of a Liverpool schoolmaster named John Bradley where he was taught arithmetic, geography and religion. Bradley was very pleased with George's demeanour and his ability and enthusiasm to learn. However, by the following year, it was decided to return George to Van Diemen's Land. It is unclear why the decision was made to return him, but it may have been George's own wish to see his homeland again.

== Return to Van Diemen's Land ==
In September 1826, George boarded the vessel City of Edinburgh bound for Australia, accompanied by Kermode. He arrived in Hobart in February 1827. By this stage, George's patron in Van Diemen's Land, William Sorell, had been replaced as Lieutenant-Governor by the austere George Arthur. Written requests from Bradley and others in England that George should be well cared for and have his education continued, saw Governor Arthur place George, who was still only aged 14, under the care of the schoolmaster Thomas Stone who headed a National School in Hobart. This reputable school was for the children of white colonists, which indicates the potential seen in George.

However, despite George seemingly doing well at his studies, being "observed among the boys let loose from Mr Stone's school, a native black boy playing with his school fellows at marbles", Governor Arthur was recalcitrant in providing funds for his education and board. This possibly impacted his care and toward the end of 1827, George fell ill with tuberculosis.

== Death and legacy ==
George Van Diemen died in Hobart of tuberculosis on 3 December 1827. He was almost certainly the first and only Aboriginal Tasmanian of unmixed heritage to visit England while still living.

== See also ==
- List of Indigenous Australian historical figures
