= Jimmy Clements =

Aboriginal elder from the Wiradjuri tribe in Australia

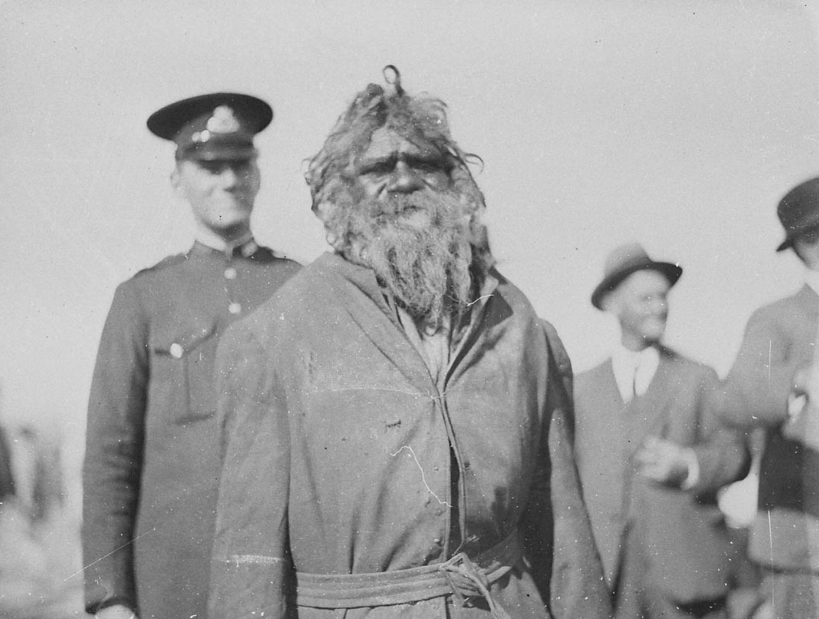
- Jimmy Clements, also known as "King Billy", at the opening of the Australian Federal Parliament, 1927.
- Born: c. 1847; Australia
- Died: 28 August 1927; Queanbeyan, New South Wales, Australia
- Other names: King Billy, Nangar, Yangar
- Known for: Activist for indigenous land rights

Jimmy Clements (c. 1847 – 28 August 1927) was an Aboriginal elder from the Wiradjuri tribe in Australia, and was present at the opening of the Provisional Parliament House in Canberra on 9 May 1927. He explained that he was there to demonstrate his "sovereign rights to the Federal Territory", making this the first recorded instance of Aboriginal protest at the Parliament.

He was also known as "King Billy" and also as Nangar or Yangar.

Clements and another Wiradjuri man, George Noble, had walked for nearly a week over the mountains from Brungle Mission near Gundagai, New South Wales. The two men were the only Indigenous people to attend the first opening of parliament. Clements was initially told to move on by police at the ceremony due to his attire but due to popular support from other members of the crowd he was among prominent citizens who were presented to the Duke and Duchess of York.

Clements died on 28 August 1927, aged 80, in Queanbeyan, New South Wales near Canberra. The newspaper report noted that he was buried in Queanbeyan cemetery "outside consecrated ground". (Indigenous Australians were not buried in consecrated ground at the time.)

== See also ==
- List of Indigenous Australian historical figures
