= Black Uhlans Motorcycle Club =

Australian Outlaw motorcycle club

Black Uhlans MC
- Founded: 1970s
- Founding location: Queensland, Australia
- Territory: Albury; Devonport; Geelong; Gladstone; Gold Coast; Smithton
- Membership: ~80 members (2006)
- Leaders: Steven Hooker (National President); Derek Lyons (Gladstone Chapter President); David Kurtzman (Gold Coast Chapter President)
- Activities: Drug trafficking, money laundering, gunrunning, assault, intimidation and murder
- Rivals: Hells Angels MC; Finks MC; Comanchero MC; Rebels MC

The Black Uhlans Motorcycle Club are an Australian outlaw motorcycle club. Maintaining several chapters throughout the country, the club has been described by law enforcement as one of the most dangerous organized crime gangs in the state of Victoria and are said to be among the wealthiest, if not, wealthiest of Australia's outlaw bikie groups.

Orchestrated by one of their 10 co-founders, the motorcycle gang held a fifteen-year reign as one of the country's largest suppliers of illicit amphetamine. Since then, however, they have reportedly become less organized and have lost a considerable amount of influence over the Australian underworld.

== Overview ==
The Black Uhlans were initially established in the 1970s in Acacia Ridge Brisbane. Before they establish their mark in Mayview st Milton in Brisbane city.

Adopting their name from Germany's historical military regiment, the Black Uhlans MC modelled themselves after the influential Hells Angels Motorcycle Club. Nevertheless, they remained independent and unaffiliated from the latter group.

After acquiring a recipe from ex-Hells Angels member Peter Hill to concoct the stimulant drug known as "speed", Black Uhlans constructed a lucrative narcotic network for the club - which proved to be extremely profitable. The Black Uhlans MC also deal in other drugs including heroin and cocaine. To further gang revenue, the gang would later become heavily involved in gun trafficking rackets from the Philippines.

In addition to generating income from organized crime operations, the Black Uhlans Motorcycle Club has also made money from financial investments in lawful business ventures such as (alleged) retirement homes in the city of Melbourne.

== Criminal allegations and incidents ==
Throughout May 1999, several violent clashes took place in Gladstone, Queensland between Black Uhlans MC and the (initially) rivaling Rebels Motorcycle Club. The two motorcycle gangs, however, eventually reached a truce - as both have since been known to associate with one another on friendly terms.

High-ranking Black Uhlans member Sydney "Syd" Collins was reported missing on September 1, 2002 during a trip from his Gold Coast residence to northern New South Wales to recover an underworld debt. During a 2009 interview with 60 Minutes, infamous Australian criminal figure Mark "Chopper" Read confessed that he had killed Collins out of revenge for an incident that occurred back in 1992 where Collins reported Chopper to the police for shooting him in the stomach. As a result of Sydney reporting Chopper Read to the authorities for the crime, Chopper ended up receiving a prison sentence of eight years at the Risdon Prison Complex that same year. According to Chopper's confession, he murdered Sydney Collins in Casino, NSW and buried his body near a football field within the town.

== In popular culture ==
A brief representation of the Black Uhlans MC (under a fictitious name) was depicted on the two-part miniseries Underbelly Files: Chopper, which stars Todd Lasance as Sydney "Syd" Collins.

== Notable members and former members ==
- Joe Kilroy, an Australian former rugby league footballer.
- Sentah Sonny Leo Unmeopa; a Torres Strait Islander activist.

== See also ==
- Comanchero Motorcycle Club
