= Tjintji-wara =

Indigenous Australian leader (c.1860 – c.1950)

Tjintji-wara (c. 1860 – c.1950) was a Matuntara woman (Luritja) and leader of her people who was born at Walker Creek in the Palmer River, a tributary of the Finke River approximately 250 kilometres (160 mi) from Alice Springs.

== Life ==
Tjintji-wara's father was Patila and her totem was the Nyarua, which is also known as Horsfield's bronze cuckoo, which has a distinctive whistle. She spent much of her early life in this region and her earliest memories are of the Ilara waterhole there with her extended family during a period of severe drought.

As Tjintji-wara got older and the drought broke the family travelled to the west, including country near Watarrka National Park and, as they travelled, she became a skilled tracker and food gatherer. Additionally, under the guidance of her uncle Mutu-tani and another relation Lunkuta-tukulta, was able to become an expert at the use of the woman's pointing bone.

There was also during this period (c1875 - c1880) feuding happening between Aboriginal groups in the region and, following the deaths of her father and grandfather, she and her mother returned to their home country. This was, in part, to avoid Tjintji-wara's marriage to her promised husband Yuna as she had chosen to marry Merikna instead.

The region was changing following the completion of the Overland Telegraph Line and, in 1885, Tempe Downs Station was established on Walker Creek. This saw the introduction of 6,000 cattle over a short period of time which drank and fouled the water that Tjintji-warra and her family relied on. This led to many of the Matuntara people spearing the cattle and being punished for doing so.

Until 1887 Tjjinti-wara avoided the station and attempted to keep away but then she and her mother came across a murdered Matuntara warrior who had been killed by her own people for breaking sacred men's law and she escaped for the area into the station itself. The then manager of the station, RF Thornton, took great interest in her and 'gave her plenty of flour and bread' before locking her in a room and raping her. He is recorded to have done this to many other young Aboriginal women nearby to the station also. Described as being 'strikingly handsome' and blonde, Thornton took particular interest in her and convinced her, for a time, to be his 'wife'.

In 1891 Tjintji-wara provided evidence at the murder trial of William Willshire in a Port Augusta court but conflicting 'Aboriginal evidence', including from Tjinti-wara's rejected promised husband Yuna, meant that Willshire was found not guilty. Tjintji-wara was able to return to her home country and, around 1893, Thornton left his role as the station manager and Tjintji-wara later married a man recorded only as 'Friday'.

'Friday' was a cattle killer and Charles Ernest Cowle, the constable at the newly established Illamurta police station, recorded Tjintji-wara's involvement in cattle killing in a report made in May 1896 and infrequent spearing of cattle occurred over the following 20 years; she was not arrested or tried for any involvement.

In 1927, with the region again in severe drought, Tjintji-wara migrated to the Hermannsburg Mission due to a lack of food sourced. While there, in 1929, Tjintji-wara was interviewed by Géza Róheim, a psychoanalyst and anthropologist who, while encouraging her to talk about her dreams, described her as:

Old Chinchi-wara [Tjinti-wara] is decidedly what we would call a "chief" among the women. Her prestige is undoubtedly connected with her knowledge of evil magic.

— Geza Roheim, 'Dreams of women in Central Australia' (1950)

When the drought broke Tjintji-wara again returned to her home and, some time later was sent back to the mission when she was unwell by the then manager of the station, for them to nurse her. However, she returned a short time later stating 'Too much soup! Too much Jesus!'.

She died on her home country in around 1950.

Most of what is known about Tjintji-wara's life is from research done by historian Dick Kimber.
