= Kitty Pluto =

Kaanju gold miner and prospector (1877–1946)

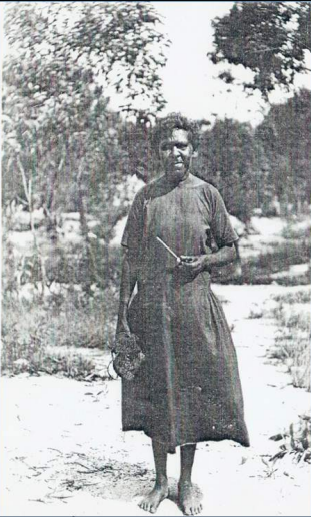
Kitty Pluto as pictured in the Queenslander Illustrated Weekly, 1932

Kitty Pluto or Altengen (1877–1946) was a Kaanju woman from the Cape York Peninsula in North Queensland who worked as a gold miner and prospector. She is credited as finding the largest gold deposits at the Batavia Goldfield. This discovery made her a household name and she was credited as being the only woman to discover a goldfield in the state of Queensland.

== Biography ==
Pluto was born in 1877 nearby the Wenlock River and many of her family members worked for William Davis who was better known as 'Pluto', who was an Indigenous Australian miner from the early 1910s. Soon after this the pair married, through tribal law, and they remained together until his death in 1916. Together the couple prospected together at the Batavia Goldfield where they claimed an area that became known as 'Plutoville' which they had found while on their honeymoon. In order to hold their claim there is had to be registered under the name of a non-Aboriginal friend as they were not able to hold their own legal rights to it as Aboriginal people.

As an Aboriginal miner, Pluto and her husband were able to work with minimal government interference, despite the restrictions listed by the Aboriginals Protection and Restriction of the Sale of Opium Act 1897, due to the remote areas in which they worked. It was also easy for miners with limited financial backing to mine alluvial gold as complex equipment was not required.

Writing of her later the Chronicle (South Australia) wrote:

For nearly two years Kitty was the only women, black or white, on the lonely goldfield, and she became something of a local heroine because of the way she worked on the claim. Almost every day from daylight to dark she toiled - wielding a pick and shovel underground, turning the windlass for lifting heavy buckets of ore from the mine, and washing dirt.

— EKP, [Aboriginal people] as gold miners, The Chronicle (South Australia), 18 July 1940

In 1915 Pluto found a large gold deposit on the goldfield after she found a large nugget there by accident and this became the richest area of the field. To mine this claim Pluto employed Aboriginal miners to work alongside her and they included William (Billy/Willie) Fox, Tuesday Smith, and Friday Wilson.

This discovery would trigger a new rush to the area (leading to the foundation of the town of Wenlock) and, for the discovery, she is recognised as being the only woman recorded as discovering a goldfield in the state of Queensland. This discovery, however, brought her and the other Aboriginal people on the field under increased control and government intervention. Because of this, in 1921, she was removed from the goldfield and sent to Yarrabah Mission alongside her son, Young Pluto, her new husband Jacky Flat and Friday Wilson. Despite the order, they never arrived there and were soon able to return to the goldfield where, in 1922, Pluto made another large discovery, this time at Kitty Gully (named for her) where she found a gold nugget weighing 92 ounces (2.6 kg).

Despite this achievement, there was a second attempt to remove Pluto from there in 1932 when, on 24 December a police constable, Alex Theis, who also served as a local 'protector of Aborigines', arrived there in order to remove Aboriginal women who were suspected of having had sexual relationships with non-Aboriginal men. At the goldfield he assaulted numerous men and destroyed many people's possessions. He left with four women, including Pluto, with an order to take her either to Yarrabah or to Palm Island. It is again not known how she escaped but she never arrived at either place.

This incident did lead to protests and public discussion of the brutality of the treatment they received. These complaints also led to an official investigation.

In 1933 in Cape York Pluto was examined by Raphael Cilento who found her to be suffering from an infection caused by untreated gonorrhea.

Little is known of Pluto's life from this point until 1939 when she was living at the Lockhart River Mission on a special pension from the Queensland government as recognition of her discovery of the goldfield. She died there in 1946.
