= Hobbles Danayarri =

Aboriginal leader in Australia (c. 1925–1988)

Hobbles Danayarri (c. 1925 – 24 March 1988) was a Mudburra man, born on Wave Hill Station, Northern Territory, Australia and he was a stockman, Aboriginal lawman and community leader.

== Life in the Northern Territory ==
Danayarri's totem was the barramundi and it is said that when his father speared the fish, and his mother ate it, the spirit of the fish became Danayarri. This was evidenced by a small mark on the right side of his forehead which showed where the fish had been speared. He was born into relationship with country and grew up learning his culture and living with his people; as a part of this he learned songs, visited sacred places and performed ritual associated with his land. He became a respected lawman.

As a young man Danayarri begun working on Wave Hill and Victoria River Downs Stations as a stockman and became aware of the injustices of this kind of work for his people. This was driven home for Danayarri before he even began working as, when he was only a small boy, still held on his father's shoulders, he went to watch Aboriginal men and women, directed by a white overseer, constructing a dam using back breaking labour. There he saw the clear demarcation of the food, clothing and types of work done by the two groups.

When he began working as a stockman he, and the other workers, did not receive adequate wages and faced discrimination as Aboriginal people. As an Aboriginal man he also did not hold citizenship rights at this time and was legally considered a ward of the state with his choices moderated by the Protector of Aborigines, and later, the Department of Native Affairs. Because of this, in 1966, he joined the Wave Hill walk-off, in which he and 200 of his countrymen, demanded land rights and fair wages.

After the walk-off, which ended in 1975, Danayarri travelled with his wife Lizzie Wardaliya, a Ngarinman woman, to Yarralin where they helped found the community.

Danayarri was a deep thinker and he told many of his own stories, many of which were formed from historical rather the Dreaming time and, to record these, he worked closely with Deborah Bird Rose and they worked together for three decades. As an example of these he would tell stories of Captain James Cook to show how his people where dispossessed of their land and forced to work on cattle stations. This account of Cook's story was designed to tell the story of the colonisation of Australia from "the other side of the beach" and his view that Cook was trespassing. He said of this:

[Cook] should have asked him – one of these boss for Sydney – Aboriginal people. People were up there, Aboriginal people. He should have come up and: ‘hello’, you know, ‘hello’. Now, asking him for his place, to come through, because [it’s] Aboriginal land. Because Captain Cook didn’t give him a fair go – to tell him ‘good day’, or ‘hello’, you know.

— Hobbles Danaiyarri, via NITV

Rose believes that Danayarri's stories, which are a form of spoken-word poetic history, are some of the greatest pieces of Australian literature and that they deserve to be significantly more well-known then they are.

Danayarri also resented the presence of 'the church' in his community and frequently asked them the leave. On one occasion he cut open a Bible with a butcher's knife and shouted:

Strike me dead, God, if this is your book, strike me dead!

— Hobbles Danayarri, via Australian Dictionary of Biography

He wanted his people to follow their own law rather than that of the white man's god.

Danayarri died of cancer on 24 March 1988 at Katherine Hospital and was buried at Wave Hill station. Following his death Danyarri believed that his body would become a shooting star and that his spirit would become a new life and that another spirit would be created that would stay forever on his country.
