= Deborah Bird Rose =

American ethnographer of Aboriginal peoples

- Born: 1946; United States
- Died: December 21, 2018 (aged 71–72); Sydney, Australia
- Occupation: Anthropologist
- Years active: 1980-2018
- Known for: Aboriginal ecological ethnography

Deborah Bird Rose (1946-2018) was an Australia-based ethnographer of Aboriginal peoples. She was an ecological, multi-species ethnographer and leader in multidisciplinary ethnographic research.

Her research since the 1980s has focused on entwined social and ecological justice, based on long-term fieldwork with Aboriginal people in Australia. Her approach has drawn on elements of anthropology, history, philosophy, cultural studies, religious studies, and animal studies and has led to innovative understandings of ethnographic and ecological knowledge, most recently in the new area of multispecies ethnography.

— Ann Standish, "Rose, Deborah Bird", The Encyclopedia of Women & Leadership in Twentieth-Century Australia (2014)

== Early years ==
Born in 1946, Deborah Bird Rose was the eldest of four siblings (Betsy, Mary, Martha, and Will) growing up in Seattle, Washington; Rock Springs, Wyoming; Salem, Oregon; Salem, Massachusetts' and Le Chambon-sur-Lignon, France. By the early 1970s Rose was attending the University of Delaware, where she worked as a research assistant and helped teach within the university's Department of Anthropology, in 1973 completing a Bachelor of Arts in anthropology.

From 1973 to 1974, Rose was a coordinator of and teacher at the Women's Education Collective of the Women's Resource Centre in Newark, Delaware. In 1977, she completed a Master of Arts in anthropology at Bryn Mawr, and for a brief period in 1979 lectured on cultural and social change at Trenton State College, New Jersey.

By 1980 Rose had enrolled in a PhD program at Bryn Mawr College and obtained a National Science Foundation grant to undertake research on the Aboriginal Australian community of Yarralin, Northern Territory. Rose also obtained an Australian Institute of Aboriginal Studies grant to study and research the cultural identity of Aboriginal peoples at Yarralin.

== Ethnographic fieldwork ==
From September 1980 to July 1982, Rose conducted twenty-two months of immersive ethnographic research within the Northern Territory Aboriginal communities of Yarralin and Lingarra, observing and interviewing mostly Ngaringman and Ngaliwurru speakers who had otherwise lived the whole of their lives on Anglo-Australian owned cattle stations. Rose participated in, photographed, and learned about their public ceremonial life, women's secret ceremonial life, and daily life in town and in the bush.

Yarralin (Australia)

From this initial period of ethnographic research, Rose learned that local Aboriginal peoples of the Victoria River District "possess their own exegesis of cosmos and humanity," also known in Australian Aboriginal English as the Dreaming, and, in 1983–84, she obtained a grant from the Australian Institute of Aboriginal Studies to write about and report on "the religious identity of the Aboriginal peoples of the Victoria river," culminating in her 1984 Bryn Mawr College PhD dissertation:

"This [...] is an ethnographic study of an Australian Aboriginal group's conceptualization of the cosmos and of the role of human being within the cosmos. The analysis is interpretive, focusing on domains of meaning which can be summarized as cosmos and humanity. I focus the analysis on the dialectics of Dreaming law, human action, and actions of other portions of the cosmos, showing how Dreaming law is both a model for, and commentary on, the life of all living beings. Dreaming law and human action both indicate that the cosmos is seen as a system which works because all its parts (humans, other living beings, the country, the seasons, and so on) are conscious and because they act according to a few fundamental principles, the goal of which is to produce a life enhancing cosmos."

In 1984 Rose presented some of her doctoral findings on the Yarralin peoples' religion and religious identity to the Australian Association for the Study of Religions, with a summary paper entitled "Consciousness and Responsibility in an Australian Aboriginal religion" which was later included in W.H. Edwards' Traditional Aboriginal Society: A Reader (1987). Rose's ethnography eventually became an influential Australian anthropological book entitled Dingo Makes Us Human: Life and Land in an Australian Aboriginal Culture, published first by Cambridge University Press in 1992 and winning the Stanner Prize for a work on Aboriginal issues.

== Postcolonial histories ==
One reviewer of Dingo Makes Us Human observed: "The author’s research is an example of [a] wave of anthropological writing, with [an] emphasis on community involvement, ownership and control." Rose herself said: "My Aboriginal teachers were particularly interested in sharing the history of colonisation with outside readers – especially with white Australians and Americans."

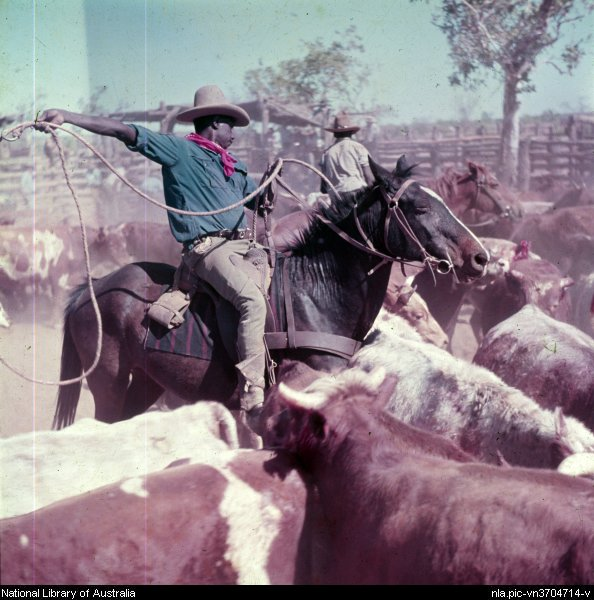
Victoria River Downs Station, Northern Territory, handling of fully grown cleanskin cattle which had been captured in trap yard, 1953

At the same time as she submitted her dissertation, in 1984, Rose submitted for publication the first of the Aboriginal histories she learned while undertaking her ethnographic fieldwork, entitled The Saga of Captain Cook: Morality in Aboriginal and European Law (1984). It was followed shortly afterwards with Ned Lives! (1986), later reissued as Ned Kelly Died for our Sins (1994), then Remembrance (1986) and Signs of Life on a Barbarous Frontier: Intercultural Encounters in North Australia (1998), all published during a stint as a visiting fellow at the Australian National University's History Department writing the Yarralin Aboriginal teachers' Hidden Histories: Black Stories from Victoria River Downs, Humbert River, and Wave Hill stations, North Australia (1991).

Rose also saw Aboriginal teachers, elders, and historians Humbert Tommy Nyuwinkarri and Hobbles Danayarri formally acknowledged in The Encyclopaedia of Aboriginal Australia (1994), also seeing Danayarri included and acknowledged in the 1996 Northern Territory Dictionary of Biography and the 2007 Australian Dictionary of Biography.

== Land rights ==
As a visiting fellow (1984–1988) with the Australian Institute of Aboriginal Studies (AIAS), whom had funded Rose's doctoral research, Rose collaborated with archaeologist and historian Darrell Lewis to co-author a paper on ethical issues for archaeologists recommending Aboriginal consultation methodologies (1985), document and assess the cultural significance of rock art in the Victoria River district (1987), and co-write a book about the latter entitled The Shape of the Dreaming: The cultural significance of Victoria River rock art (1988).

Rose and Lewis also researched, wrote, and provided expert opinion for the Kidman Springs/Jasper Gorge (1986) and Bilinarra (Coolibah-Wave Hill Stock Route) (1989) land claims under the Aboriginal Land Rights (Northern Territory) Act 1976.

Later (1993–1998) as a fellow with the Australian National University's Darwin-based North Australia Research Unit, Rose undertook further statutory Northern Territory land rights work, including writing senior anthropological reports and providing expert opinion for the Kamu Country Land Claim (1993) and the Kenbi (Cox Peninsula) Land Claim on behalf of the Tommy Lyons Group (1995).

Rose played a major role in the Victoria and New South Wales Yorta Yorta Native Title claim in the 1990s, supporting the claimants against the Kennett ministry's intransigence.

Rose was also consulted by, and provided specialist anthropological advice to the Aboriginal Land Commissioner, Justice Peter Gray, in relation to the Central Mount Wedge Land Claim (1998), Palm Valley Land Claim (1999), Alcoota Land Claim (2007), and the Wangkangurru Land Claim (2014).

== Publications ==
=== Books ===
==== As author ====
- Rose, Deborah Bird and Darrell Lewis (1988). The Shape of the Dreaming: the Cultural Significance of Victoria River Rock Art. Canberra: Aboriginal Studies Press. ISBN 0855751878.
- Rose, Deborah Bird (1991). Hidden Histories: Black Stories from Victoria River Downs, Humbert River and Wave Hills Stations. Canberra: Aboriginal Studies Press. ISBN 978-0855752248. OCLC 24405276.
- Rose, Deborah Bird (1992). Dingo Makes Us Human: Life and Land in an Aboriginal Australian Culture. Cambridge, England: Cambridge University Press. ISBN 978-0521392693.
- Rose, Deborah Bird (1996). Nourishing Terrains: Australian Aboriginal Views of Landscape and Wilderness. Canberra: Australian Heritage Commission. ISBN 978-0642235619.
- Rose, Deborah Bird, Kathy Devereaux, Margaret Daiyi, Linda Ford, April Bright and Sharon D'Amico (2002). Country of the Heart: An Australian Indigenous Homeland. Canberra: Aboriginal Studies Press. ISBN 0855757760.
- Rose, Deborah; James, Diana; Watson, Christine (May 2003). Indigenous Kinship with the Natural World in New South Wales (PDF) (Report). NSW National Parks and Wildlife Service. ISBN 0-73136-7049.
- Rose, Deborah Bird (2004). Reports from a Wild Country: Ethics for Decolonisation. Sydney. ISBN 978-0521794848. OCLC 63187291.
- Rose, Deborah Bird (2011). Wild Dog Dreaming: Love and Extinction. University of Virginia Press. ISBN 9780813930916. OCLC 663101308.
- Rose, Deborah Bird (2022). Shimmer: Flying Fox Exuberance in Worlds of Peril. Edinburgh University Press. ISBN 978-1-4744-9039-9.

==== As editor ====
- Rose, Deborah Bird, Thom van Dooren and Matthew Chrulew (2017). Extinction Studies: Stories of Time, Death, and Generations. Columbia University Press. ISBN 9780231178815.
- Gibson, Katherine, Deborah Bird Rose and Ruth Fincher (2015). Manifesto for Living in the Anthropocene. New York: Punctum Books. ISBN 978-0-9882340-6-2.
- Rose, Deborah Bird and Richard Davis (2006). Dislocating the Frontier: Essaying the Mystique of the Outback. Australian National University Press. ISBN 9781920942366.
- Rose, Deborah Bird and Anne Clarke (1997). Tracking knowledge in Northern Australian landscapes: studies in indigenous and settler ecological knowledge systems. Australian National University Press. ISBN 0731528832.
- Rose, Deborah Bird (1995). Country in flames: Proceedings of the 1994 symposium on biodiversity and fire in North Australia. Canberra: Biodiversity Unit, Australian National University.
- Rose, Deborah Bird and Tony Swain (1988). Aboriginal Australians and Christian missions: ethnographic and historical studies. Bedford Park: Australian Association for the Study of Religions. ISBN 0908083157.

=== Selected articles and book chapters ===
- Rose, Deborah Bird (1989). "Remembrance". Aboriginal History. 13 (1/2): 135–148. ISSN 0314-8769.
- Rose, Deborah Bird (1990). "A distant constellation". Continuum. 3 (2): 160–173. doi:10.1080/10304319009388170. ISSN 1030-4312.
- Rose, Deborah Bird (1996). "Land Rights and Deep Colonising: The Erasure of Women". Aboriginal Law Bulletin. 3 (85).
- Bird Rose, Deborah (2013), "Common property regimes in Aboriginal Australia: totemism revisited" (PDF), The Governance of Common Property in the Pacific Region (2nd ed.), ANU Press, doi:10.22459/gcppr.03.2013.09, ISBN 978-1-922144-75-1
- Rose, Deborah (February 2001). "Aboriginal life and death in Australian settler nationhood" (PDF). Aboriginal History Journal. 25: 148–162. doi:10.22459/AH.25.2011.09. PMID 19514156.
- Rose, Deborah Bird (2005), Sherratt, T.; Griffiths, T.; Robin, L. (eds.), "Rhythms, patterns, connectivities: indigenous concepts of seasons and change, Victoria River District, NT", A Change in the Weather: Climate and Culture in Australia, Canberra: National Museum of Australia, pp. 32–41
- Rose, Deborah (December 2005). "An Indigenous Philosophical Ecology: Situating the Human". The Australian Journal of Anthropology. 16 (3): 294–305. doi:10.1111/j.1835-9310.2005.tb00312.x. ISSN 1035-8811.
- Rose, Deborah Bird (June 2005). "Pattern, Connection, Desire: In honour of Gregory Bateson". Ecological Humanities (35).
- Rose, Deborah Bird (Spring 2012). "Multispecies Knots of Ethical Time". Environmental Philosophy. 9 (1): 127–140. doi:10.5840/envirophil2012918. ISSN 1718-0198.
- Rose, Deborah Bird (2013). "Anthropocene noir". Arena Journal (41/42): 206–219.
- Rose, Deborah Bird (May 2013). "Val Plumwood's Philosophical Animism: Attentive Interactions in the Sentient World". Environmental Humanities. 3 (1): 93–109. doi:10.1215/22011919-3611248. ISSN 2201-1919.
