= Pluto (William Davis) =

(1869–1916) prospector and mining entrepreneur

Pluto or William Davis (c.1869 – 16 January 1916 ) was an Aboriginal Australian man who worked as a prospector and mining entrepreneur primarily within the Batavia Goldfield in Queensland, Australia. Later in his life he worked alongside his wife Kitty Pluto (Altengen).

== Biography ==
Pluto was born in Charters Towers and little is known of the early details of his life, including his specific Aboriginal heritage, although it is known that he began working as a stockman by the time he was a young man, primarily at stations in the region of the Burdekin River. In 1889, when he was around 20, he was jailed for two months in Townsville Gaol for assaulting a police constable and later, in 1890, spent two years at the Boggo Road Gaol for burglary. When not in jail he appeared regularly in court on various charges including for fighting, vagrancy and public drunkenness.

After being release from jail Pluto travelled north and, by 1896 begun trying his luck as a gold prospector. He first worked at the goldfields at Coen before moving onto the Batavia Goldfield in 1905; here he discovered a large deposit of gold which he named 'Chock-a-Block'. In early 1910 Kitty Pluto, and many of her family members, came to work for Pluto and the pair married sometime after then. Together, in October 1910, they discovered another large deposit on the goldfield which was named 'Pluto’s Lead No. 1' and it caused a small rush to the field. This rush was delayed until 1911 as news of the discovery was suppressed so that local miners had their first choice of ground. However, the eventual rush did lead to the formation of 'Plutoville', a town founded on the goldfield, to house the miners brought there and it remained in use until 1922.

In order to be able to mine legally and stake their claims the pair had to have the help of a non-Aboriginal friend, Wade Robinson, as their rights were restricted as Aboriginal people and under the Aboriginals Protection and Restriction of the Sale of Opium Act 1897. Additionally, records also showed that Pluto often worked alongside a non-Aboriginal man known only as 'Anderson', but no one of that name is shown to have held a miner's right there, it is likely that they either partnered to allow Pluto more rights or that he was 'made up' by Pluto to avoid discriminatory legislation.

After this Pluto and Kitty also made other gold discoveries including; 'Pluto’s Lead No. 2' (1911), 'Pluto's Gully' (1912) and 'The Tunnel' (1914) and, in their work, they often worked alongside other Aboriginal miners. For these discoveries he became known as "the black gold-tracker".

Pluto died on 16 January 1916 in Coen where it was rumoured he had found more gold deposits. After his death it was claimed that his major discovery at 'Pluto’s Lead No. 1' had been made by "pure accident" when driving a tent peg into the ground in an attempt to discredit him.
