= Wenlock Goldfield =

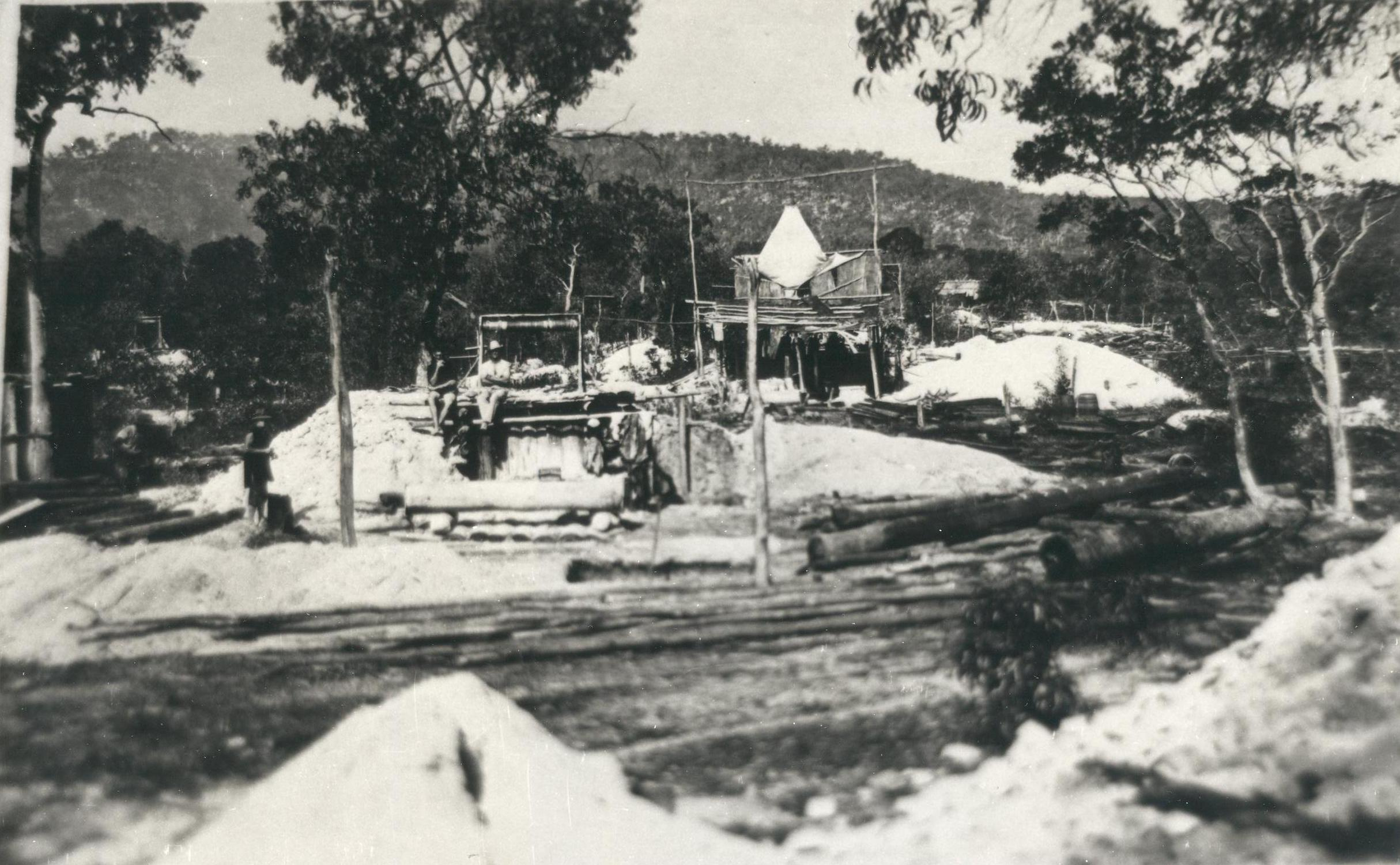
- Wenlock Gold Mine, 1930s

- Location within Queensland Location within Australia
- 13.0894°S 142.9435°E
- Location: Archer River, Shire of Cook, Queensland, Australia

History
- Design period: 1870s–1890s (late 19th century)
- Built: 1892–1950s

Queensland Heritage Register
- Official name: Wenlock Goldfield, Batavia Goldfield, Lower Camp (Wenlock)
- Type: state heritage (archaeological, built)
- Designated: 3 March 2006
- Reference no.: 601862
- Significant period: 1890s–1950s (fabric, historical)
- Significant components: mullock heap, pathway/walkway, workings - shallow, footings, machinery/plant/equipment - mining/mineral processing, alluvial workings, mining camp/settlement site, tailings dump, trees/plantings, garden edging/balustrades/planter boxes, shaft, burial/grave

Wenlock Goldfield is a heritage-listed mine in Archer River, Shire of Cook, Queensland, Australia. It was built from 1892 to 1950s. It is also known as Batavia Goldfield and Lower Camp (Wenlock). It was added to the Queensland Heritage Register on 3 March 2006.

== History ==
Wenlock Goldfield (formerly Batavia Goldfield) and the settlement of Lower Camp are situated along the eastern bank of the Wenlock River on Cape York Peninsula, about 100 kilometres (62 mi) north of Coen. The Batavia Goldfield was proclaimed in 1892, following discovery of gold at Retreat Creek (a tributary of the Wenlock). In subsequent years camps known as Bairdsville, Top Camp (Plutoville), and Lower Camp (Wenlock) were established and supplied from Coen. The settlement of Lower Camp was formed after Kitty Pluto discovered gold there in 1915. It became the main township on the Batavia Goldfield in the 1930s and was officially named Wenlock in 1938. It is around this time also, that the Batavia Goldfield became known as the Wenlock Goldfield.

Alluvial gold had been discovered on the Cape York Peninsula as early as 1876, on the Coen River, after attention was drawn to the region by the Palmer goldfield. A small rush ensued in 1878. Although this soon dissipated, by the late 1880s a small township had been formed at Coen. In 1892 the Coen Goldfield was proclaimed officially and reefing work commenced. Although production totals paled in comparison with fields such as the Palmer, within the next few years the erection of batteries and a cyanide works at Coen gave the northern Peninsula a permanent base for prospecting expeditions. Gold was found on the Starcke River in 1890, at Batavia (Wenlock) in 1892, Ebagoola in 1899 and Potallah in 1902.

Following William Baird's discovery of gold at Retreat Creek in 1892, a 13 kilometres (8.1 mi)^{2} area around the camp of Bairdsville was proclaimed as the Batavia Goldfield. Output for 1892–1893 was an estimated 2,000 ounces of alluvial gold worth £4 per ounce. Miners continued prospecting the area. In 1906 gold was discovered at the Tunnel, 2 kilometres (1.2 mi) northeast of Lower Camp. The discovery of gold at Plutoville (Top Camp) by an Aboriginal man named Pluto in 1910 was suppressed, to allow Coen and Ebagoola miners first choice of the ground, and a rush did not take place until mid 1911.

Despite being so close to the workings at Top Camp (Plutoville), gold was not discovered at Lower Camp until January 1915 when an Aboriginal woman, Pluto’s wife, Kitty Pluto, accidentally discovered a nugget while carting surface wash from Top Camp (Plutoville) to the Wenlock. Both Top Camp and Lower Camp workings are situated on the east bank of the Wenlock River, close to the edge of a low Mesozoic sandstone tableland rising above the workings. However the main centre remained at Plutoville (Top Camp) from 1911 to 1922. Stores owned by Dehn, Armbrust and Shepherd traded at Top Camp.

The original shallow alluvial area at Lower Camp covered less than 0.4ha and by 1916 most miners either had returned to Plutoville, prospecting the surrounding countryside, or had left the region altogether. In 1922, a group of miners attempted to locate the main leader's northern extension beneath the mantle of Mesozoic sediments. After sinking several shafts, they came across an auriferous lead at a depth of 5.4 metres (18 ft) and at a distance of 20 metres (66 ft) from a reef, which provided rich specimen stone. From then until the late 1930s, the Lower Camp was in constant production and has officially returned a yield of 35,016 ounces of gold.

The most productive area was confined to deeper ground to 25 metres (82 ft) and contained within the New Year's Gift, Prohibitionist, Double Chance, Band of Hope, Golden Casket and Hidden Treasure claims, all of which were later converted into general mining leases.

The Batavia was the most productive goldfield in Cape York during the economic depression of the early 1930s, with six payable mines. In 1932 it produced 2,793 ounces of recorded gold valued at £9,287, compared to 3,342 ounces valued at £11,114 in 1931. The use of motor lorries greatly assisted operations on the field. Two batteries had been established by the end of 1931 to crush the one-ounce stone. One of these was Forsythe's, formerly at Belmore Creek near Croydon, which had been shifted to the Batavia field in November 1931. Peninsula Mines Limited had taken over two leases at the beginning of 1932. Two boarding houses were established at Lower Camp during 1932 with 75 people on the field. A crude-oil engine driven Huntington mill began work in November 1932. Sheppard erected a six head stamp battery driven by suction gas. The Peninsula Mines Limited was using an oil engine driven boring plant. By 1935 the yield was 1,326 ounces of gold (more than the previous year) from the New Year's Gift, Golden Casket, Reform, Black Cat, United, Double Chance, Hidden Treasure and Duke leases. By the mid-1930s there was a population of about 160.

In 1938 Larsens' Consolidated Pty Ltd who were employing 20 men on the Prohibitionist, Winner, Dole, Tin Hare and Rose leases, moved their battery closer to the Duke and other leases. The battery output was 1,122 ounces of gold from the mines and dumps. Additional drills, a generator and a Wilfley table were purchased. The mill used several Berdan Pans to further grind the coarse mills tails in amalgam. Three head of stamps, driven by a diesel engine, were erected at the Golden Casket mine in 1938.

Also in 1938, The mine was officially named Wenlock.

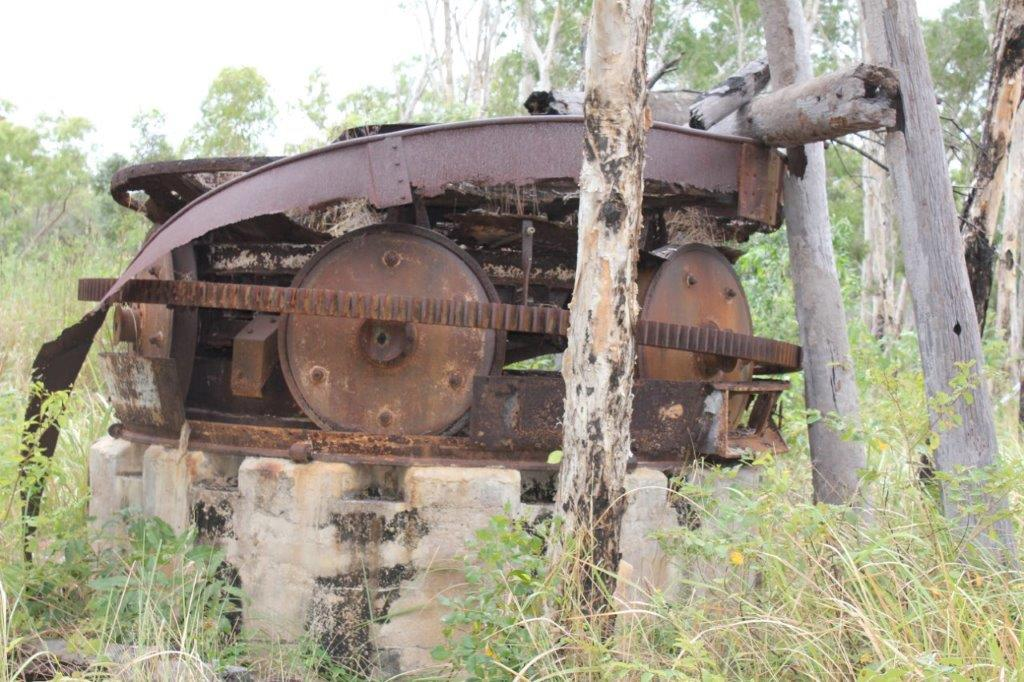
Remains of the Empire mill installed at Wenlock in 1939

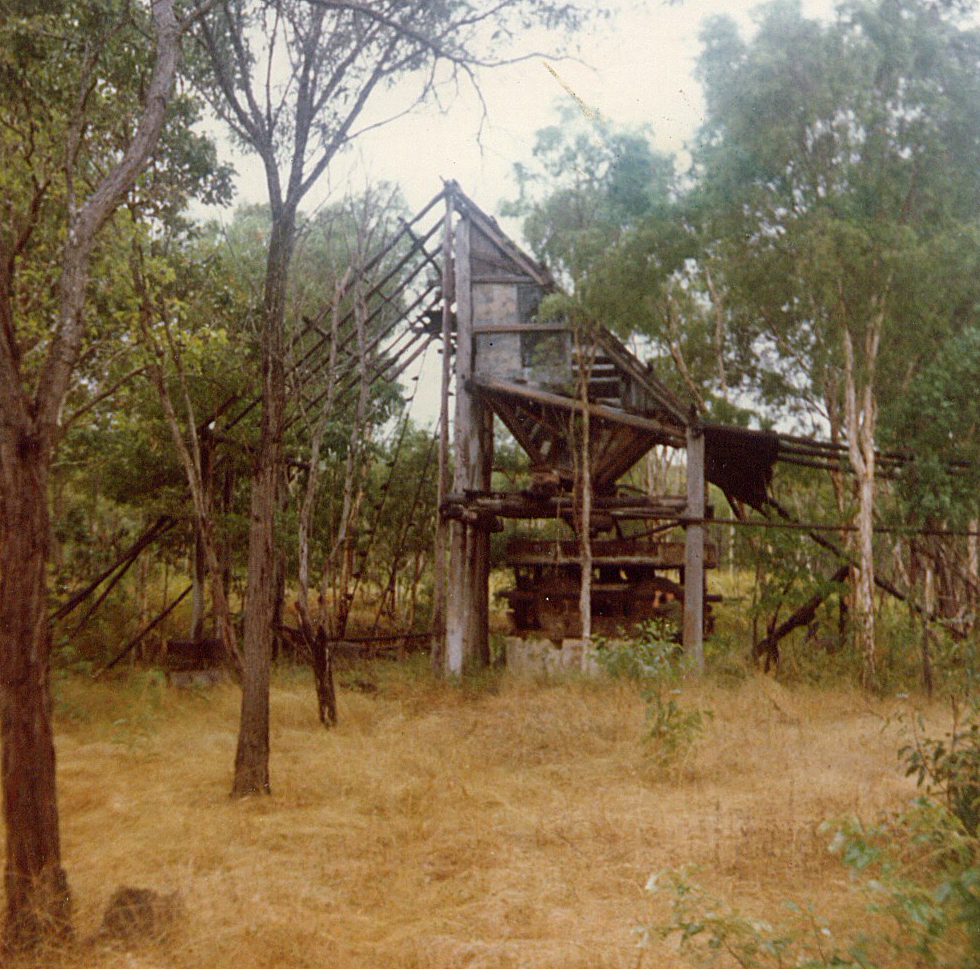
Larson’s Empire Mill Building - 1979

Miner Frank White told the story that the Three headed Battery ran for 24 hours per day and would run through the night while miners were trying to sleep. The miners thought the stamper battery was making a very good return. They lulled themselves to sleep with words in their heads of “Quid - A - Minute” “Quid - A - Minute” in time with the Battery’s three head rhythm of “thud - thud - thud” pause “thud - thud - thud”. A miners wage for working shift work was 5 quid (Pounds) per week. A new multi-tubular boiler and five foot Empire roller mill were installed at the Black Cat Amalgamated Mine in 1939–40 by Peter Larsen.

In 1942 the Australian Army dismantled and removed smaller, more portable equipment from the mines and mills of the Wenlock Goldfield. This was to prevent the Japanese from utilising the mines should they invade. This episode is one of the few examples of the scorched earth policy implemented on the northern part of Cape York Peninsula when invasion seemed imminent.

In 1946, in the wake of World War II, the Golden Gate, Reform, Black Cat Amalgamated, Golden Casket, Wasp and Black and White mines were reopened. Joseph Fisher and Sons constructed a road from Portland Roads to Wenlock, which necessitated seven bridges. The central pier of the bridge over Garraway Creek can be seen on the northern side of the present road to Portland Roads.

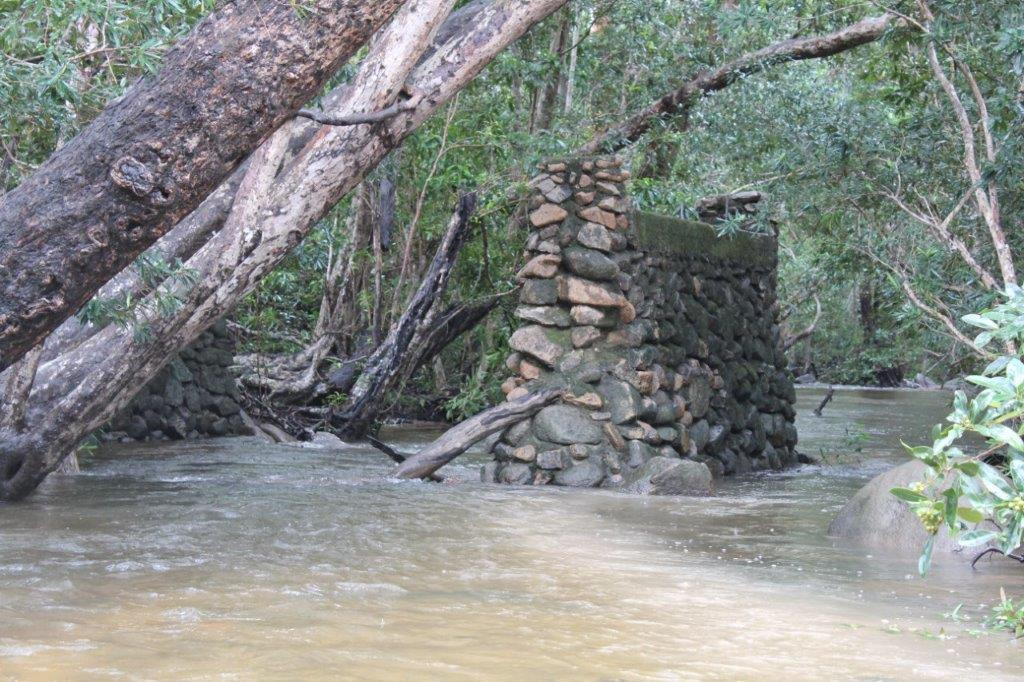
Remnant central pier of the Garraway Creek bridge constructed by the Fishers in 1946 to access Wenlock from Portland Roads

Sheds and huts were erected and machinery was installed at the mines. At the Black Cat Amalgamated mine a Marshall portable steam engine, a rock drill sharpener, air compressor, air hoist, Blake steam duplex pump and a Worthington steam duplex pump were installed in the re-equipping of the mines.

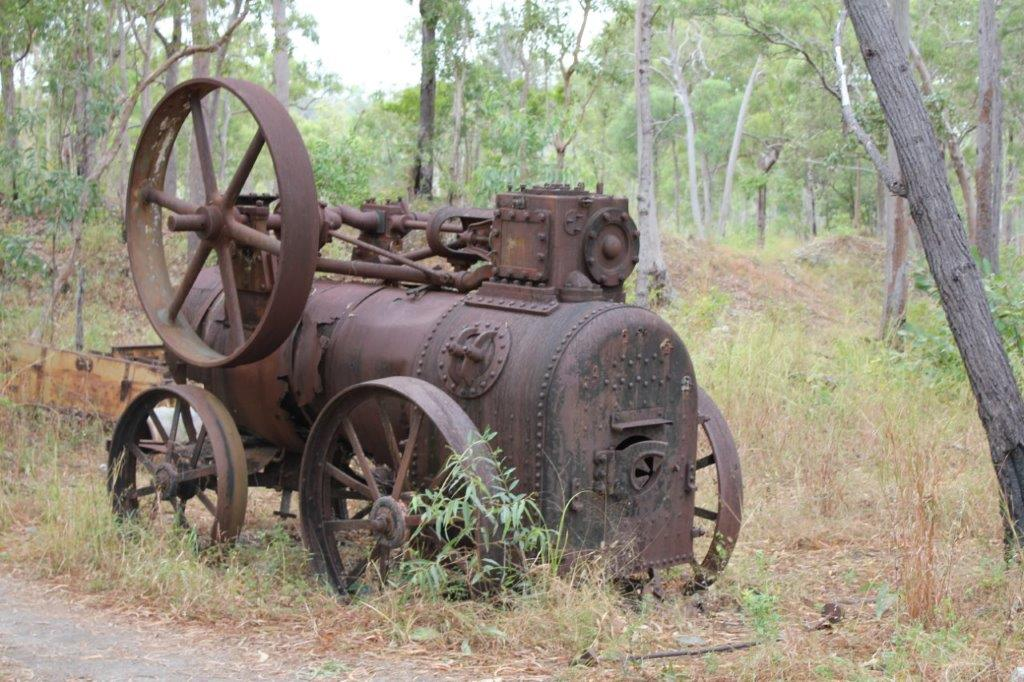
Old steam engine - Wenlock Goldfields

In 1947 Joseph Fisher and Sons purchased Zammit's mines to obtain a complete block. After finishing carting their machinery from Portland Roads harbour they commenced reconditioning the Black Cat Amalgamated mine. The first crushing was put through the battery by June 1947 and 239 ounces of gold valued at £2,264 was obtained by the end of December 1947. A total of 517 tons of stone was crushed in the first year for a total return of 296 ounces, and dewatering was commenced and completed down to below the No.1 level. The main shaft was re- timbered, a new headframe and brace constructed, and a 2,000 gallon tank installed. Also that year the Wasp Syndicate, working on the Edna May Extended and Golden Casket leases, produced 520 tons of stone for a return of 349 ounces of gold.

In July 1948 an agreement was signed between miner William Charles “Frank” White as holder of Miners Right Claim 115 over the area known as the “Hidden Treasure” Claim and Joseph, Norman and William Joseph Fisher in a 50:50 arrangement whereby Frank White would use the Fishers equipment as necessary and via shafts and drives owned by the Fishers to access the Hidden Treasure claim. The Wenlock was still the best producing field in Cape York in 1949, although production was far below that of 1948 (364 ounces compared to 557 ounces). In 1950, 324 ounces of gold were produced from the Black Cat Amalgamated mine, 47 ounces from Edna May and 26 ounces from the Golden Casket. All the mines were flooded in April when the Wenlock River broke its banks. Dewatering was completed by the end of May by obtaining a Mines Department pump. Production declined markedly in 1951 to 203 ounces of gold and there were only the Fishers and one other person mining there. There were only four miners there in 1952 - the Fishers, George Scowan and Fred Taylor. Fisher and Sons put through 51 tons of Black Cat Amalgamated stone for a return of 2.63 fine ounces and another 11 tons from underground yielded 14 ounces of gold; 206 tons of dump yielded 27 ounces of gold. The total production amounted to £526. In 1953 FH Taylor, lessee of the Wasp and Edna May Extended, was carrying out improvements. He hired a Southern Cross diesel engine and pump from the Mines Department preparatory to sluicing the Edna May dump and deepening the Wasp.

As noted above production declined after the 1950 floods due to the lack of suitable pumps and many workings were abandoned. William Stanley, the last inhabitant from this earlier period, lived at Wenlock until his death in 1957. Prospectors continued fossicking around the old workings and during 1964–65 the recovery of two tons of handpicked specimen stone yielding 2,787 ounces of gold was reported. In 1986 claim holders used excavators to rework the Top Camp diggings and some coarse nugget gold was recovered before the field was abandoned. All evidence of the early Plutoville settlement and Top Camp workings were lost during this operation.

== Description ==
=== Wenlock Goldfield ===
The place comprises an area of intensive surface workings, mine shafts, mullock dumps, plant and equipment and structural foundations. One partly collapsed headframe of bush timber remains over the Golden Casket shaft. A concrete tank and structural foundations to its north indicate the remains of a tailings treatment area. The three main areas of surviving plant were associated with Fisher's Black Cat Amalgamated group of leases, Larsen's Consolidated leases, and Larsen's Deep mine.

The remains of the Black Cat group include several caved shafts, a Marshall portable steam engine, a vertical boiler, a colonial boiler and a more recent Southern Cross diesel engine. Larsen's Consolidated plant, to the north, is located alongside a large tailings dam site over Tunnel Creek. The area of mill sands extends north for over 200 metres (660 ft). The Consolidated plant is centred around a partly intact Huntington mill, which is seated on a heavy concrete base. A suction gas producer is situated alongside. Larsen's Deep shaft, to the east, includes several small concrete machinery mounts around a caved shaft and a vertical boiler and winch. Scowan's workings, comprising an extensive area of surface diggings, extend east from the area.

Extensive surface workings also extend south and west of the described area. A recent hut and campsite is located 150 metres (490 ft) north-west in association with another large area of tailings.

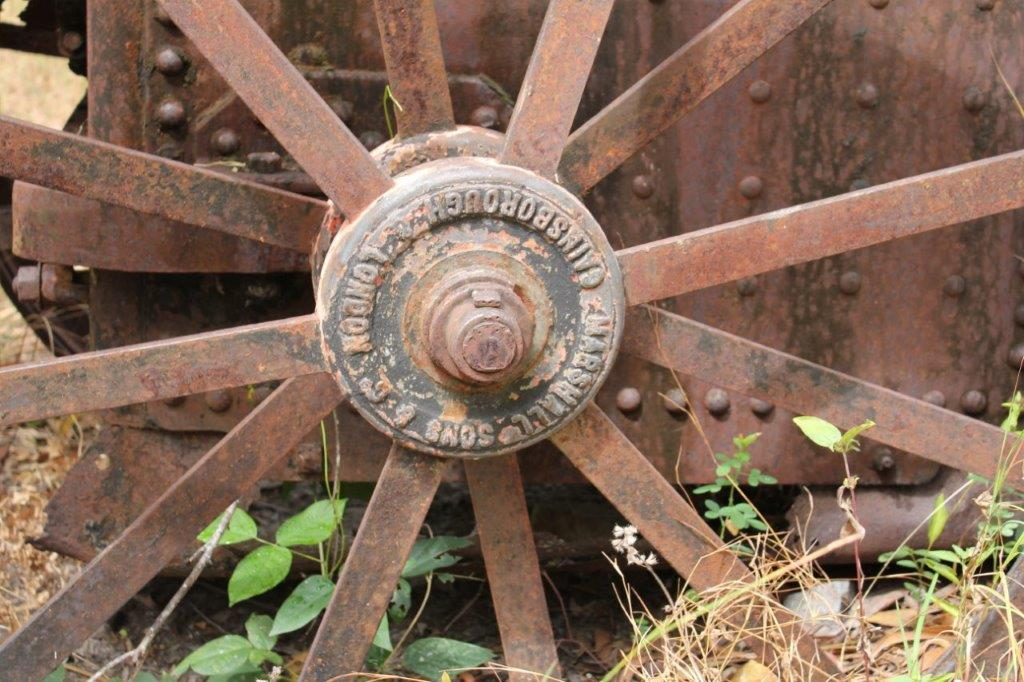
Old steam engine manufacturers plaque on wheel

==== Plant ====
Surviving plant at the site includes:

- One-cylinder portable steam engine - Marshall Sons & Co. Gainsborough & London.
- One-cylinder horizontal suction gas engine - Ruston Proctor & Co Lincoln.
- Vertical boiler - no brand.
- Truck chassis with engine - International (engine no. 437DA).
- Colonial boiler - no brand.
- Four-cylinder diesel engine - Southern Cross.
- Huntington mill - Manufactured by Babcock & Wilcox Limited Regent Park N.S.W.
- Gas producer - Hoskins Ltd Co. Makers.
- Vertical boiler - no brand.
- Two-cylinder one drum winch - no brand.

=== Lower Camp Settlement ===
The Lower Camp settlement area is centred on the east bank of the Wenlock River, extending from the vicinity of the grave of Thomas Power 200 metres (660 ft) north of the crossing, for about 1 kilometre (0.62 mi) northward to the junction of a small creek with the river.

The grave of Thomas Power is located on the bank of the Wenlock River and is surrounded by a tube steel rail. It contains a form-cast concrete headstone inscribed - "In Memory of Thos Power Died 10 2 30". Thomas Power reputedly died in a gunfight in 1930.

The settlement area, which extends up to 200 metres (660 ft) east of the riverbank, is profusely covered with large stands of mature mango trees. There is some evidence of campsite surfaces, bottle dumps, fence posts, as well as a large number of 44 gallon drums scattered about the site. A path and garden edging made of upturned beer bottles covering an area of approximately 3 by 6 metres (9.8 ft × 19.7 ft) is visible in close proximity to a number of mango trees and scattering of fibrous cement strips. About 40 metres (130 ft) north of the beer bottle garden are a series of 6 linear ditch and mound features that run parallel to the riverbank and measure about 13 metres (43 ft) in length. Each ditch is approximately 1 metre (3 ft 3 in) wide and its associated mound about 1.5 metres (4 ft 11 in) wide. These may provide evidence of a level of self- sustainable agricultural practice or communal vegetable patch that helped support the residents of this isolated mining settlement.

One concrete slab or floor surface is evident in the settlement site, which measures approximately 6 by 4 metres (20 ft × 13 ft) and is associated with a metal scatter, but no structures are apparent. However, housing and roofing materials including corrugated iron sheeting and fibrous cement strips/roof capping are scattered throughout the site. An old truck body can also be seen in the Lower Camp settlement site.

=== Forsythe's Batavia Battery site ===
Forsythe's Batavia Battery site is located on the riverbank at the junction of a small creek, about 1 kilometre (0.62 mi) north-west of the main Wenlock Lower Camp workings and mill. The site is identifiable by several small concrete engine mounts. No plant or structures remain.

== Heritage listing ==
Wenlock Goldfield was listed on the Queensland Heritage Register on 3 March 2006 having satisfied the following criteria.

The place is important in demonstrating the evolution or pattern of Queensland's history.

Wenlock Goldfield is significant historically as the most productive goldfield on Cape York Peninsula during the depression years of the early 1930s. Its richness has contributed to constant reworking and fossicking since then. The role of Aboriginal peoples (Pluto, Kitty Pluto, Friday Wilson) in discovering and working the mining claims is significant. In addition, Kitty Pluto is the only woman recorded as discovering a goldfield in Queensland. The removal of portable mining machinery from the Wenlock by the Australian Army during World War Two is an example of the tactical action of denying the enemy resources which could be useful to an advancing enemy.

The place demonstrates rare, uncommon or endangered aspects of Queensland's cultural heritage.

Lower Camp Goldfield incorporates a wide range of diversified equipment and is comparable to many examples across the state. Isolation has been a factor in the survival of the plant as there were significant access problems. The Huntington mill is rare and the most intact of the two recorded in North Queensland.

The place has potential to yield information that will contribute to an understanding of Queensland's history.

Wenlock Goldfield has the potential to provide valuable information contributing to an understanding of Queensland's history. Analysis of the spatial positioning of dwelling sites in relation to mine workings, would provide new information about life at isolated mines on Cape York goldfields in the late 19th and early 20th centuries. The diversified collection of surviving mining plant has the potential to contribute significantly to our understanding of early to mid- 20th century gold mining techniques.

The place is important in demonstrating the principal characteristics of a particular class of cultural places.

Wenlock (Lower Camp) is significant as the focal settlement of the most productive goldfield on Cape York Peninsula during the 1930s. Surviving evidence includes a lone grave, a concrete surface, scatters of housing materials, garden bed edging constructed of beer bottles, remnant vegetable garden/landscaping, and the largest concentration of mango trees recorded in association with a North Queensland mining camp.

The place is important because of its aesthetic significance.

The place possesses an evocative quality, engendered by the cultural landscape value of remnant workings and camp remains set within natural bush, which generates aesthetic significance.
