= Cissy McLeod =

Australian Aboriginal woman

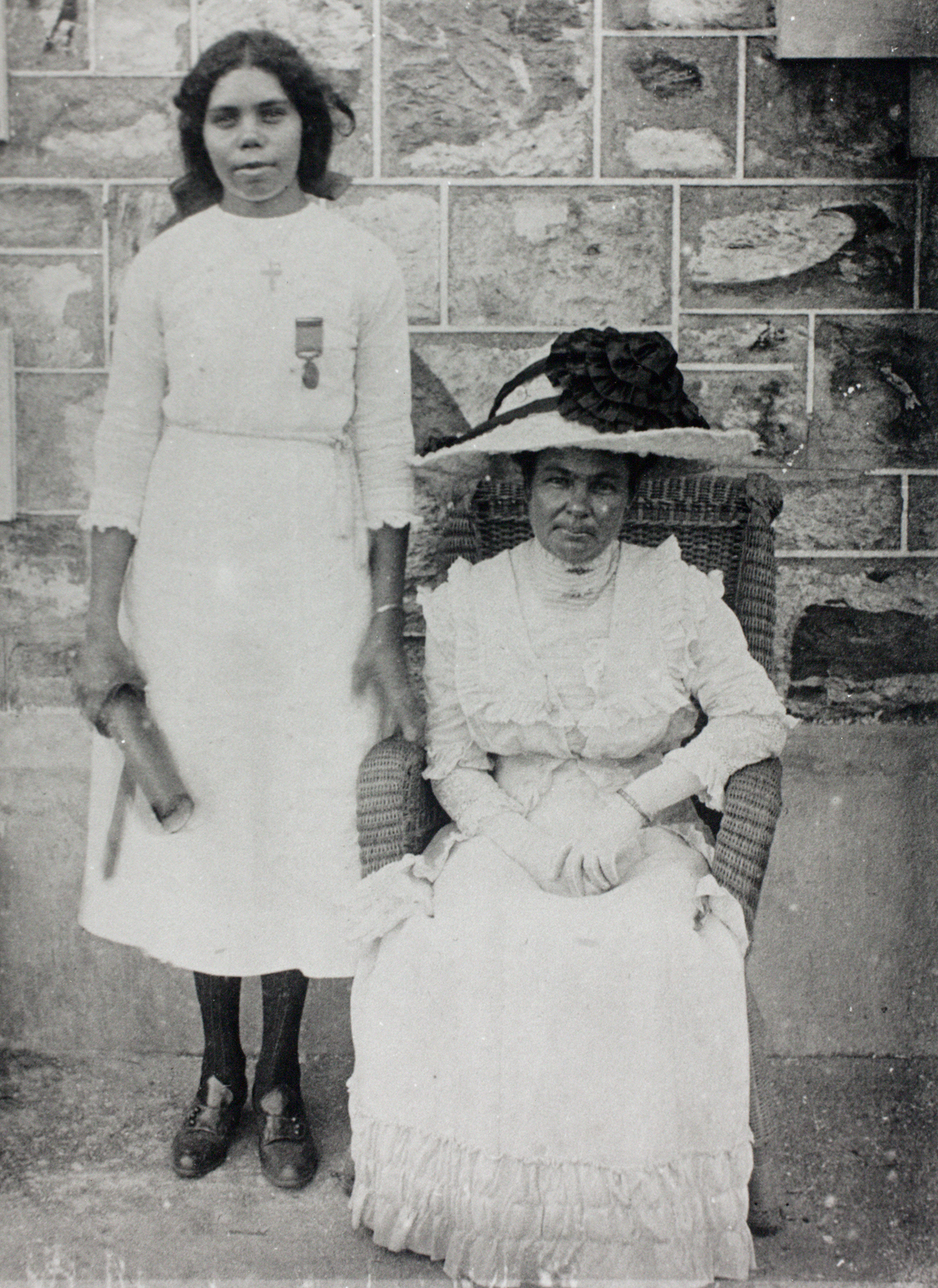
Cissy McLeod and Mrs Mugg

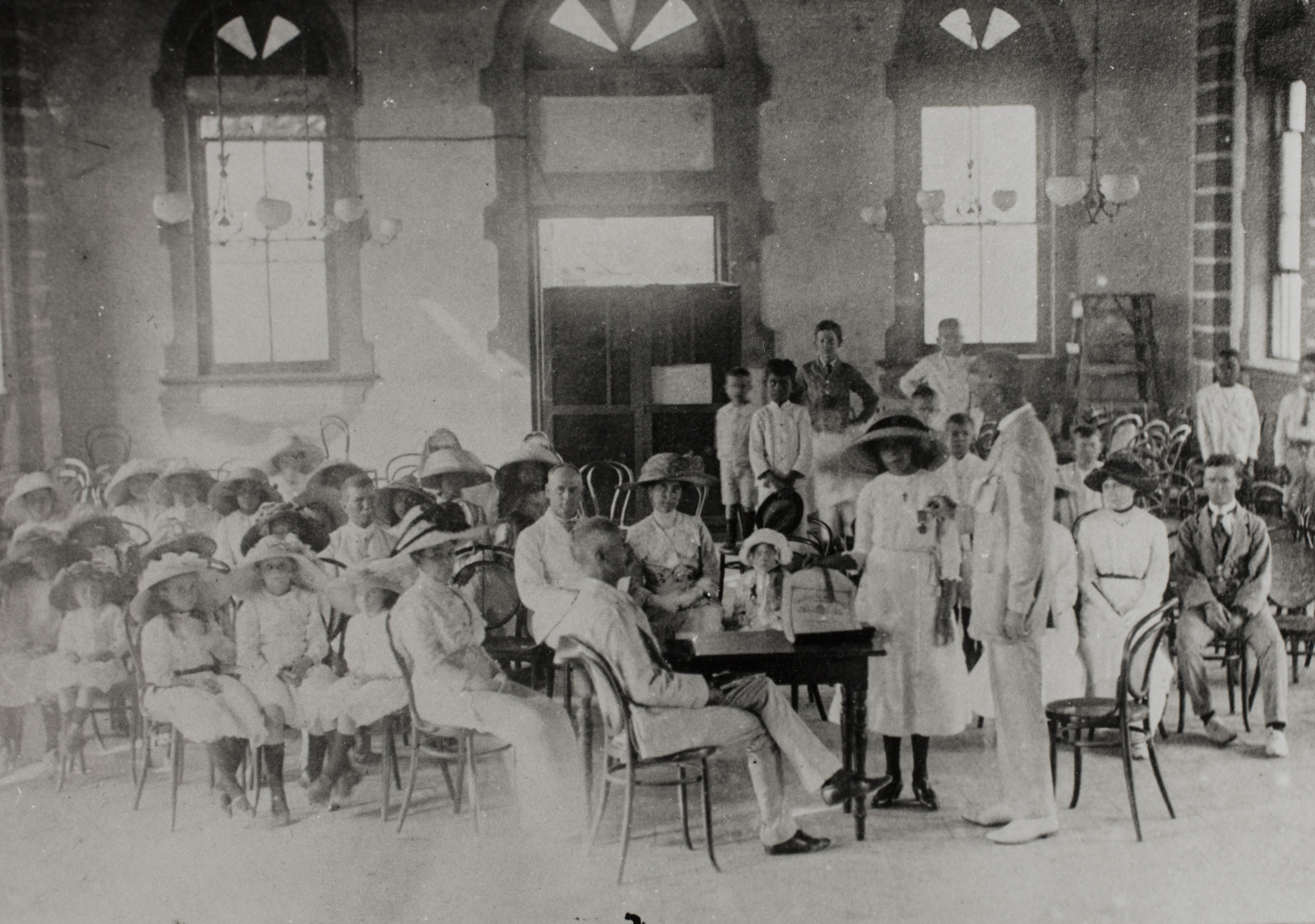
Cissy McLeod receiving her medal for bravery at Palmerston Town Hall in 1913.

Cissy McLeod sometimes spelt Cissie McLeod (c.20 July 1896 (Note: McLeod's exact birth date is contentious. Her birth date is recorded as 20 July 1896 in South Australian records (the Northern Territory was part of South Australia at the time). She was reported as being 13 years old at the time of her act of bravery in 1912 and 31 at the age of her death in 1928.) – 6 February 1928) was the first Indigenous woman in Australia to receive a bronze medal from the Royal Humane Society for her act of bravery when saving her adoptive mother in Darwin in the Northern Territory of Australia.

== Early life ==
McLeod was born in Borroloola, the daughter of Arthur McLeod and an Aboriginal woman recorded only as 'Polly'. Arthur McLeod was the resident policeman, justice of the peace, local magistrate and storekeeper who managed Jolly's Store and he and Polly had two children together Cissy and Clara. They are both recorded as having other children. McLeod, and her sister, were adopted by Captain Frederick Mugg, of the Government Steamer in Darwin, and his wife Mrs Mary Mugg.

The nature of this adoption is not clear and the sisters were referred to as both the couples 'adopted children' and 'foster children'; it is worth noting that at this time the Northern Territory operated under South Australian legislation where there were no formal adoption laws until 1925. It is also unclear how the children came to be living with the Muggs and, in letters, Percy Kelsey, claimed that Arthur McLeod had been 'unable to look after' his 'illegitimate children'; what is very unclear is the feelings and intentions of their mother Polly whose say in the matter is not recorded. it is, however, clear that the Muggs offered a loving home and McLeod and her sister were well cared for and Kelsey wrote that '[t]hey were nice girls and the Muggs treated them as if they were their own children'.

Upon moving to Darwin McLeod attended the Convent school in Darwin where, despite there being a facility specifically for 'half-caste' girls to receive basic literary and housekeeping skills, she was able to attend the 'main' part of the school In 1910 McLeod was awarded for achieving the 'highest mark for school work' in her class.

== Act of bravery ==
On 9 January 1912, McLeod, who was 13 at the time, saved her adoptive mother Mary, who, on a dark night, fell off a jetty and disappeared into the waters of Darwin Harbour. Against the strong tide, McLeod jumped in the water and brought Mugg, who was unable to swim, to a pillar where she kept her afloat until they received assistance from a steamer SS Suffolk (Note: Other sources state the assisting vessel was the Guthrie.) that was moored at the pier.

The incident was brought to the attention of the Minister of External Affairs, who notified the Royal Humane Society. She was then awarded a bronze medal by the for her bravery on 12 September 1913 in front of a crowd of more than 100 people. At the ceremony it was stated that "it was no light thing for this child without a moment's hesitation, into the darkness of the night, to leap down into a sea known to be alive with sharks and alligators, to help one she loved."

McLeod worked as a teacher and organist at the Methodist Sunday School and at the Kahlin Compound, before moving to Singapore with her sister Clara and the Muggs. She then visited England and France, where she contracted tuberculosis and died on 6 February 1928, aged 31. She was buried at Sutton in Surrey.

== Publications ==
Cissy's story is recorded in the following books:

- Farram, Steven (2018). 'Two excellent girls' : Cissy and Clara McLeod, the Northern Territory 'half-caste' foster daughters of Captain and Mrs Mugg. Historical Society of the Northern Territory, Casuarina, NT
- Smith, Robyn Stafford (2020). Quincy and Cissy. NA, Casuarina, NT
