= Muttama, New South Wales =

Muttama New South Wales
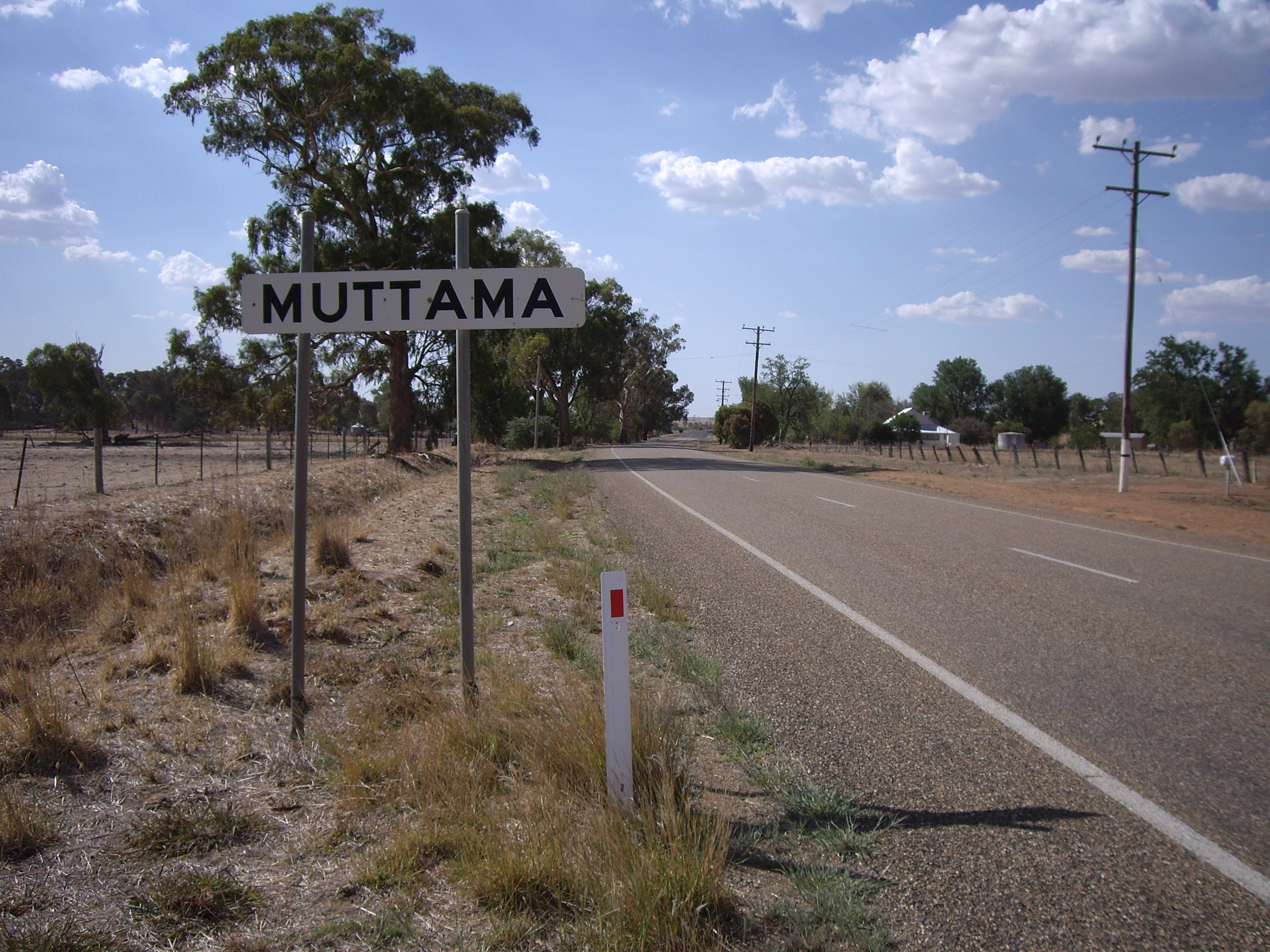
- Entering Muttama

- Coordinates: 34°48′10″S 148°07′01″E
- Population: 140 (SAL 2021)
- Postcode(s): 2722
- Elevation: 357 m (1,171 ft)
- Location: 24 km (15 mi) from Cootamundra; 17 km (11 mi) from Coolac
- LGA(s): Cootamundra-Gundagai Regional Council
- County: Harden
- State electorate(s): Cootamundra
- Federal division(s): Riverina
Localities around Muttama:
Cootamundra
Bethungra	Muttama	Jugiong
	Burra Creek	Coolac

Muttama is a rural community in the central east part of the Riverina. It is situated by road, about 24 kilometres south of Cootamundra and 17 kilometres north of Coolac.

The name Muttama is derived from the local Aboriginal word meaning "like it" or "take it". Others who should know are not so sure.

Mining in the area began in the 1860s and Muttama prospered with the discovery of gold at Muttama Reef in 1882. Muttama Reef Post Office opened on 1 February 1876, was renamed Muttama in 1889, and closed on 12 October 1979. The village was served by a railway station on the Tumut branch from 1886 to 1975, when passenger services were discontinued. All goods traffic on line was suspended after flooding in 1984.

The Memorial Hall was erected as a tribute to the settlers of the area who enlisted for service in the Great War of 1914–1918. A poster in the hall gives a timeline of Muttama history:

1826 – Governor Darling proclaimed the "limits of location" to try to regulate settlement, with additions made in 1829 and formalised in the Nineteen Counties. Squatters had already pushed past the boundaries.
1828 – Francis Taffe squatted on vast tracts of land from Jugiong to Mingay and to Gobarralong. The stations were collectively known as the Muttama Run. Leases had been granted through the 1830s – 1840s.
1836 – Governor Burke's Act allowed squatters to run stock for £10 per year under an annual Depasturing Licence beyond the "Limits of Location".
1847 – The Squatters' Act allowed leases for 14 years.
1852 – Francis Taffe JP reportedly "generously provided materials from his store for the destitute people of Jugiong after the breaking of the 1850–51 drought by the devastating flood in 1852. The flood obliterated the settlement, wiping out homes, the store and the original Sir George tavern, owned and operated by the popular innkeeper, John Patrick Sheahan.
1861 – South Western District Gold Fields proclaimed
1862 – Gold rush ensued in and around Muttama and production commenced.
1876 – Muttama Reef Post Office opened. Renamed Muttama Post Office in 1889.
1879 – Muttama Gold Field Extended was proclaimed on 20 May.
1882 – Approximately 800 men reportedly had been prospecting in the Muttama area.
1882 – Muttama Public School opened
1885 – Village of Muttama was proclaimed on 20 March.
1886 – Railway line at Muttama opened
1902 – Immaculate Conception of Christ Church was built by Father Butler and opened by Bishop William Lanigan
1903 – Presbyterian Church build was initiated
1903 – Muttama Run was broken up into 107–2600 acres and auctioned during October
1910 – The Closer Settlement Promotion Act allowed three to five discharged soldiers to purchase privately-owned land, in accordance with the Minister of Lands' terms. The land was occupied as a Settlement Purchase Area.
1914–18 World War
1916 – Returned Soldiers Settlement Act provided loans from the Commonwealth Government and land from the State Government on Crown and Closer Settlement lands.
1920 – Gazette of Soldier Settlement of land from the Bongolong Estate
1925 – Muttama Hall opened on 20 May
1929 – Great Depression
1939–45 World War II
1968 – Muttama Public School closed
1976 – Railway line was closed to the community
1977 – Presbyterian Church became Uniting Church
1979 – Muttama Post Office closed
1984 – Railway line was closed for transportation of goods
1995 – Title deeds of Muttama Hall transferred to Gundagai Council
2010 – Uniting Church was sold for $32,000
2016 – Muttama Hall closed for public use due to its deterioration
2018 – Last service was held at Immaculate Conception of Christ Church by Fathers Brian Hennessy and Joshy Kurien.
2020 – The Church of the Immaculate Conception of Christ was sold for $55,000
2021 – Muttama Hall reopened after multiple grants funded its reconstruction and conservation

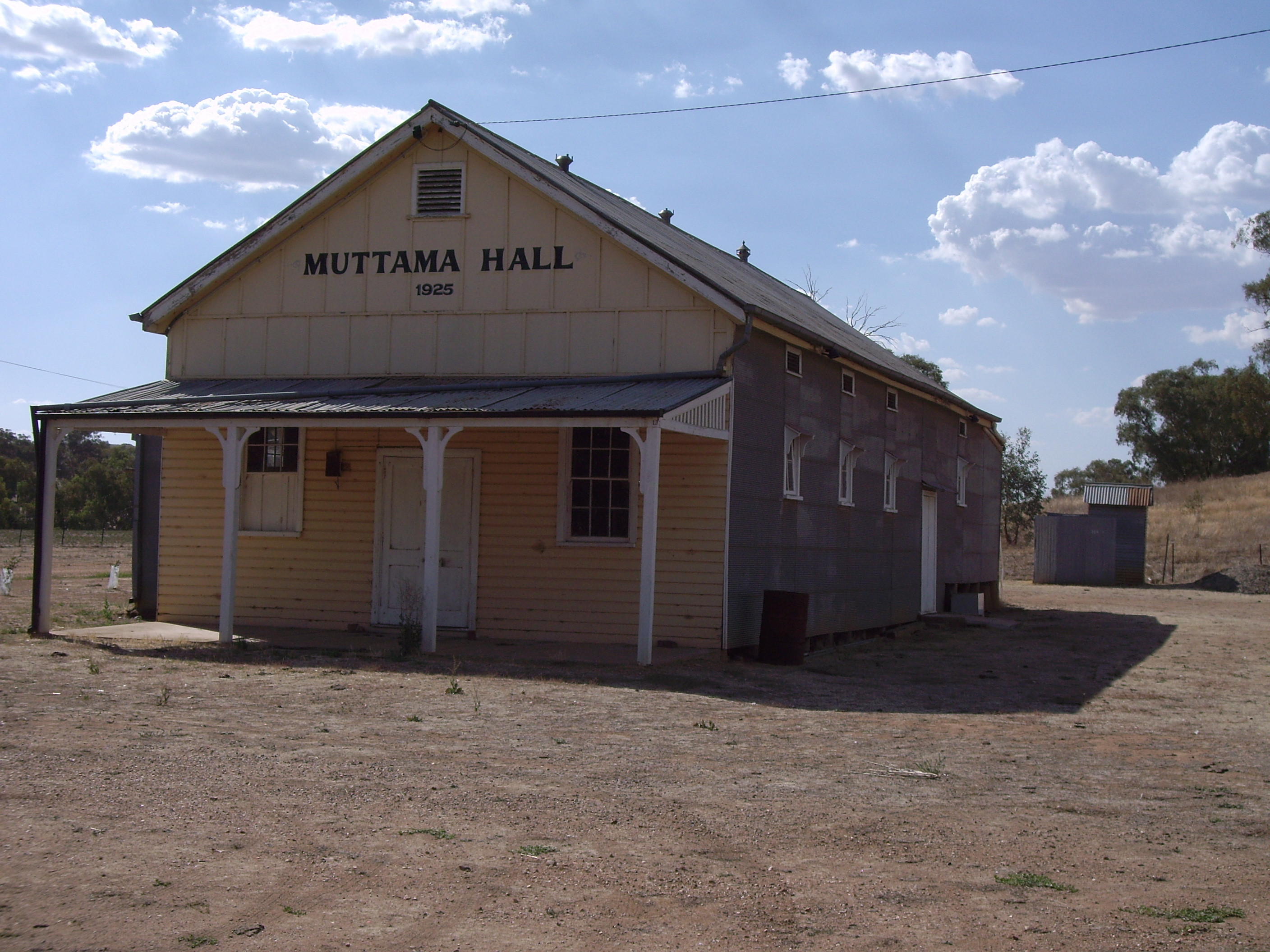
Muttama Hall 2007

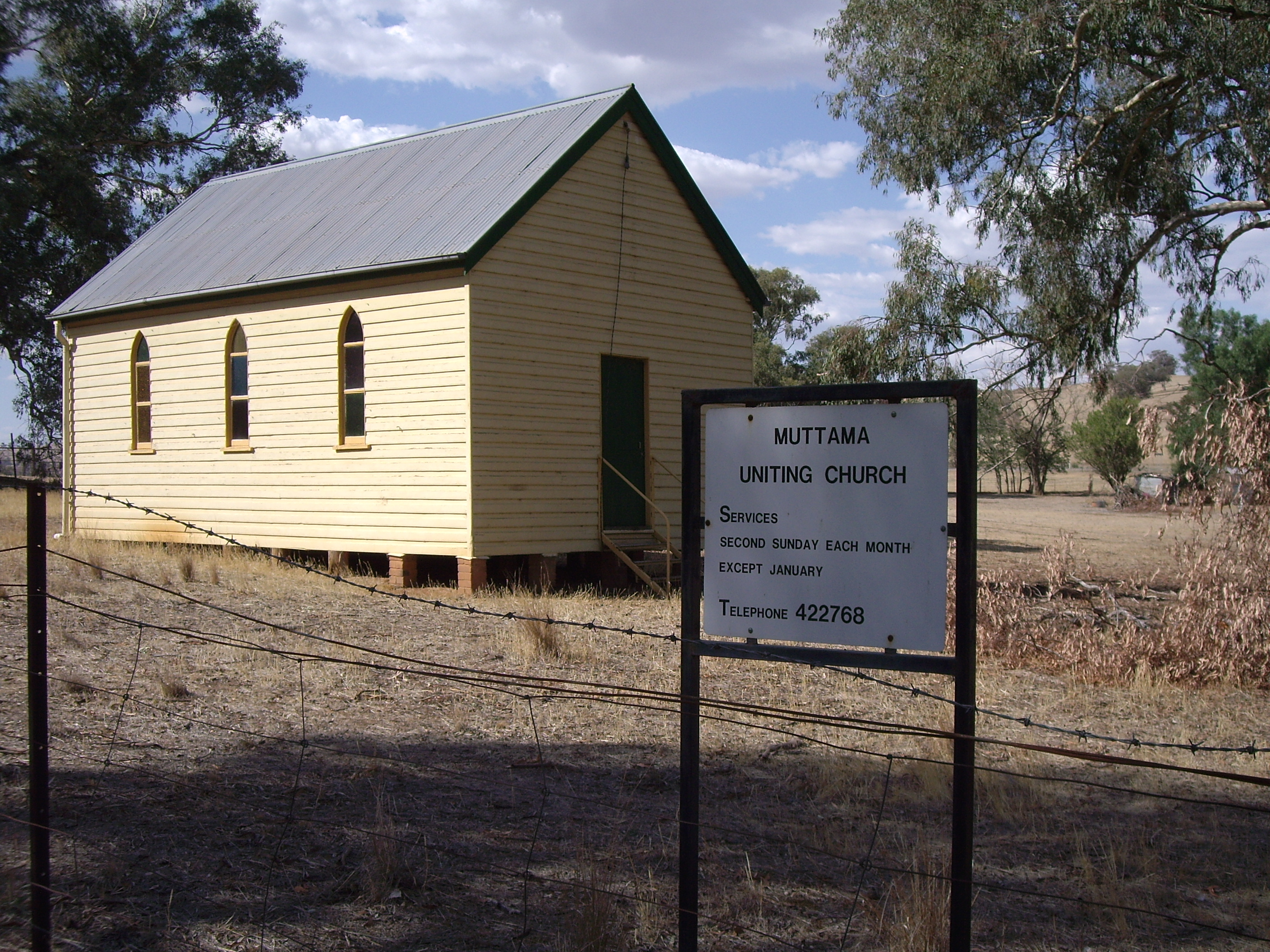
Muttama Uniting Church

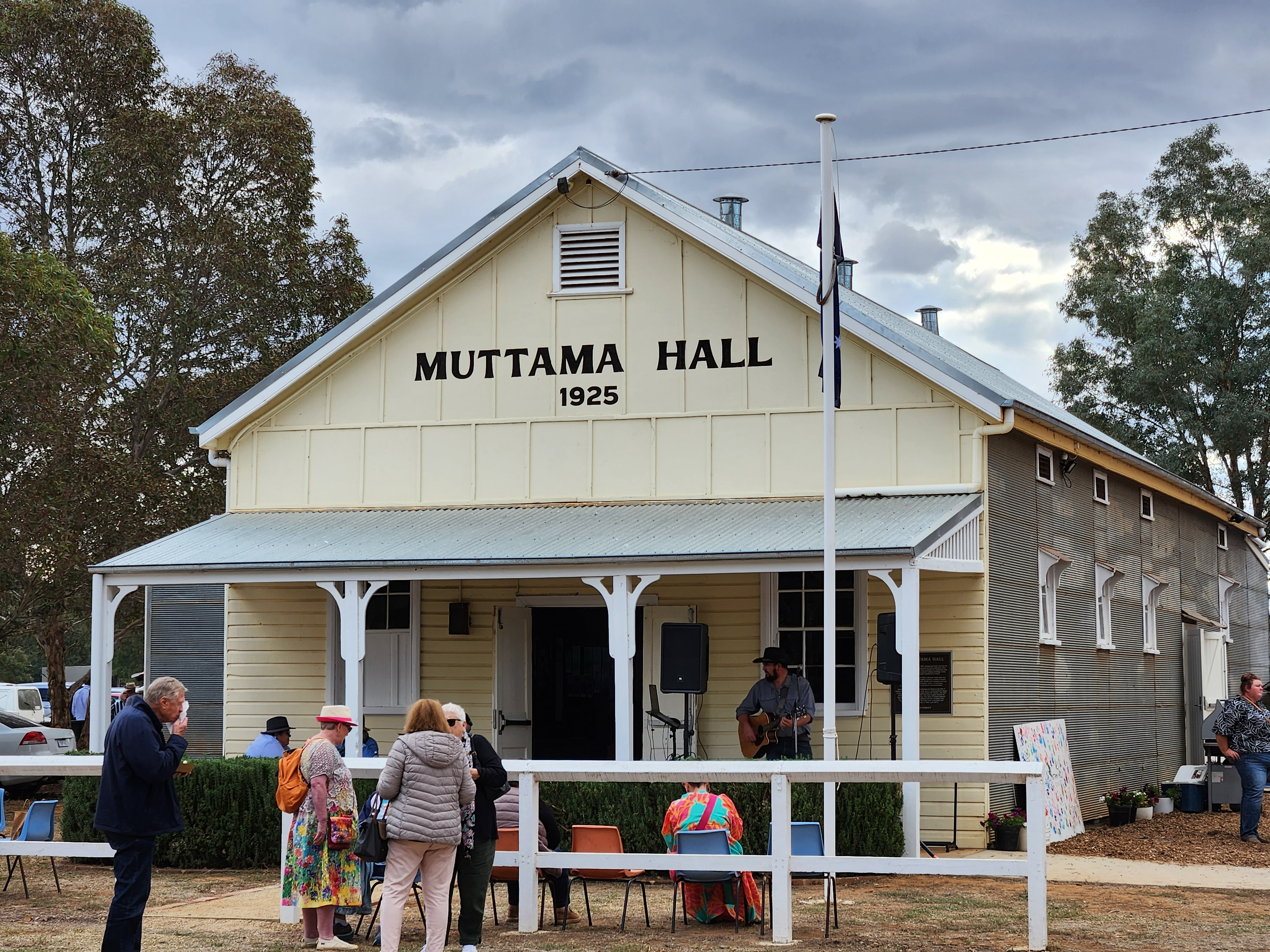
Muttama Hall 2025
