= Sentah Sonny Leo Unmeopa =

Indigenous leader and activist (1946-1996)

Sentah Sonny Leo Unmeopa also known as Santa Unmeopa (12 January 1944 - 22 June 1996) was an Australian Torres Strait Islander man who was an Indigenous leader and activist for his people. He spent much of his life in Queensland where he was involved in activism throughout his life including as a leader in protests against Joh Bjelke-Petersen's government from the 1960s to the 1980s and other protests relating to land rights and self-determination for Australian First Nations people.

He was also later chairperson of ATSIC's South-East Queensland Indigenous Regional Council from 1993 until his death.

== Early life ==
Unmeopa was born in Mackay, in Queensland, and he was the youngest of three children born to Koostantinoes (Koos) and Ramina Maraia Unmeopa. His father worked as a farm labourer and he was of Indonesian descent, having gone to Thursday Island in the Torres Strait in 1926 as an indentured labourer/seaman within the pearling industry. It was there that he met Ramina who was of Torres Strait Islander and Indonesian background and she had a daughter from a previous relationship.

Unmeopa's parents moved away from the Torres Strait, and on to the mainland, shortly before his birth due to the civilian evacuation of the island during World War II in March 1942; this took place after Japan entered the war. This meant that each of their three children were born here. They would later separate in the 1950s.

By the mid-1940s to family settled in Mackay where Unmeopa attended local schools and, as a young man, trained as a boxer with the Waratah Amateur Boxing and Wrestling Club.

== Career ==
In 1961, when Unmeopa was 17, he and his brother Koostantinoes William (Bill) Unmeopa signed up as divers on the Sari Rizah which was collecting Trochus throughout the Torres Strait. This ship was skippered by Douglas Pitt senior until around 1968.

In 1968 Unmeopa spent a month in the army as a national serviceman and then joined the Australian Merchant Navy. During this period he settled in Brisbane and become involved in the politics of the day. He joined mass protests against Joh Bjelke-Petersen, the then Premier of Queensland, and his governments role in suppressing civil and human rights.

In 1978 Unmeopa left the merchant navy and began working for the Aboriginal and Torres Strait Islanders Corporation in Queensland, this was later known as the National Aboriginal Conference, as the office manager for the legal services department. During this time he was involved in organising numerous protests and sit-ins, mostly in regards to land rights, and some of the most famous of these took place in the lead up to the 1982 Commonwealth Games which took place in Brisbane; these protests were designed to urge the government to implement the recommendations of the Royal Commission into Aboriginal Deaths in Custody. During these protests he was arrested at least once and was, in the media coverage of it, the only Aboriginal person to be interviewed or named. One later arrest was on 29 April 1986, when he was involved in a sit-in at the Brisbane offices of the Aboriginal Development Commission and was charged with trespass; he was convicted but the charge was later overturned.

In the 1980s he was also, alongside footballer Joe Kilroy, one of the only Indigenous members of the Black Uhlans Motorcycle Club.

His time at the corporation was dogged with allegations of financial misconduct, including improper use of corporate credit cards, unapproved travel and undocumented cash spending and he was removed from his position in the early 1990s. However, in 1996, the office, and therefore Unmeopa, was cleared of any wrongdoing.

In 1990 Unmeopa was elected to ATSIC's South-East Queensland Indigenous Regional Council but resigned shortly afterwards; he was later reelected in 1993 at which point he was its chairperson until his death on 1996. Under his leadership the Council worked to improve the social and economic lives of the people living in South-East Queensland with the aim of self-determination.

== Later life ==
Unmeopa died on 22 June 1996 at Coopers Plains, a suburb of Brisbane.
