= Géza Róheim =

Hungarian-American psychoanalyst & anthropologist (1891–1953)

- Born: 12 September 1891; Budapest, Austria-Hungary
- Died: 7 June 1953 (aged 61); New York City, U.S.
- Scientific career
- Fields: Psychoanalyst, anthropologist

Géza Róheim (Hungarian: Róheim Géza [ˈroːhɛjm ˈɡeːzɒ]; September 12, 1891 – June 7, 1953) was a Hungarian psychoanalyst and anthropologist.

Considered by some as the most important anthropologist-psychoanalyst, he is often credited with founding the field of psychoanalytic anthropology; was the first psychoanalytically trained anthropologist to do field research; and later developed a general cultural theory.

== Life ==
The only child of a prosperous Budapest family, Róheim studied geography and anthropology at the universities of Leipzig, Berlin and eventually Budapest, where he received his doctorate in 1914. In 1919 he became the first professor of anthropology at the University of Budapest and a member of the local psychoanalytic society.

Róheim was analysed by Sándor Ferenczi and became a training analyst with the Budapest Institute of Psychoanalysis. Being Jewish, he was forced to leave Hungary in 1939, on the eve of the Second World War. He settled in New York City; and unable to return to communist controlled Hungary after the war, he spent the rest of his life in New York.

While unable to fit comfortably into academic anthropological circles in the U.S. — despite receiving support from figures like Margaret Mead and Edward Sapir — Róheim published prolifically there, and taught through a privately organised seminar.

== Work ==
Róheim is best known for his (and his wife Ilonka's) nine-month stay at or near Hermannsburg Lutheran Mission in central Australia in 1929 — a trip which generated great interest in psychoanalytic circles — and for his subsequent writings about Arrernte and Pitjantjatjara people. His research was used to support Ernest Jones in his debate with Bronislaw Malinowski over the existence of the Oedipus complex in matrilineal societies.

He also did fieldwork in Melanesia, native North America and the Horn of Africa.

His theory of culture stressed its rootedness in the long period of juvenile dependence in humans, which allowed for the possibility of exploration and play.

== Publications (select) ==
- Mirror Magic (1919)
- The Riddle of the Sphinx (1934)
- The Origin and Function of Culture (1943)
- In the Gates of the Dream (1952)
- The Psycholanalytic Study of Society (1960-67) Eds.Muensterberger & Axelrad
- Fire in the Dragon (1992)

== See also ==
- Dreamtime
- Folktales
- Life Against Death
- Magical thinking
- Neoteny
