= Botany Bay Colebee =

18th-century Aboriginal Australian

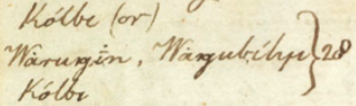
Kólbi's name, written by William Dawes

Wárungin Wángubile Kólbi (Note: Wárungin Wángubile Kólbi is how William Dawes originally spelt his name, though it has also been spelt Warrungin Wabgubile Coleby and Warungin Wangubilye Kolbi.) (c. 1763 – after 1790), better known as Botany Bay Colebee, was an 18th-century Aboriginal Australian man of the Gweagal people.

== Family ==
Kólbi's was born c. 1763 into the Gweagal clan, which lived on the area of the southern side of the Georges River and Botany Bay stretching towards the Kurnell Peninsula. His father's name was Mety.

In the Dharawal language, 'Warangan' means boomerang. According to convict Thomas Watling, Kólbi was a common Aboriginal name in the Sydney area.

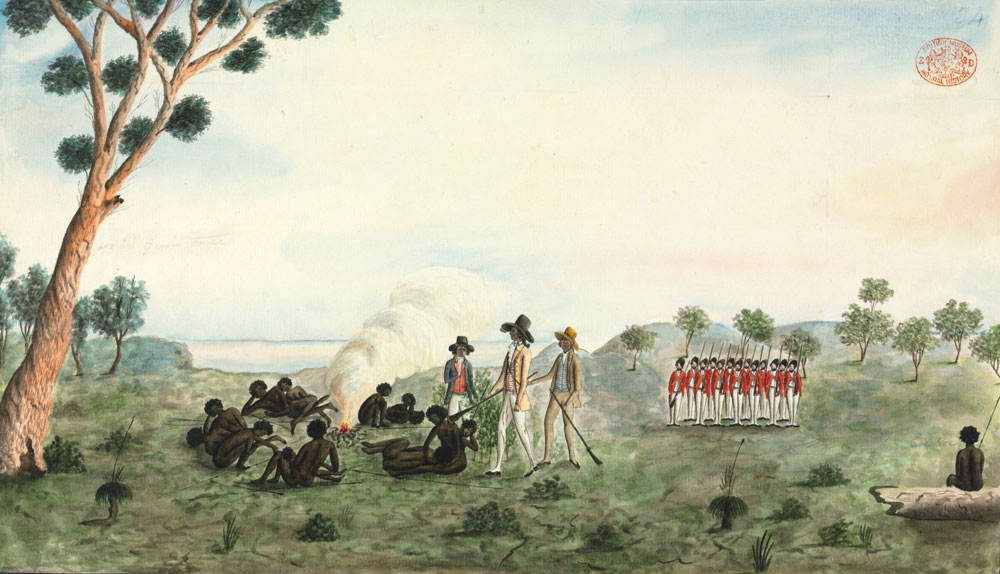
This watercolour depicts Botany Bay Colebee wounded after an attack, c. 1790–1797.

Kólbi had at least one sister, Kurubarabulu (c. 1774 – after 1805), who married Gringerry Kibba Colebee. Kólbi exchanged names - a symbolic act of friendship - with Colebee. To distinguish the two men, the Gweagal prefixed Colebee's name with "Cadi" - referencing his belonging to the Cadigal people. As the British colonists had encountered Colebee first, they referred to Kólbi as "Botany Bay Colebee".

Kólbi's wife was Karangarang, Wadigabú Murianang Kurut Kurut (born c. 1766). It is likely she exchanged names with Bennelong’s sister Carangarang.

== Interaction with colonists ==
It appears Wárungin Wángubile Kólbi was wounded at some point, possibly in a skirmish with colonists. A watercolour by the Port Jackson Painter is captioned "Mr White, Harris and Laing with a party of Soldiers visiting Botany Bay Colebee at that place, when wounded". Cadi Colebee is depicted sitting on a log nearby. As a friend of White, a British surgeon, he may have asked White to attend to Kólbi's injuries.

Art historian Bernard Smith suggested that the watercolour depicted a known "headhunt" in December 1790. However, historian Michael Flynn notes that Laing did not arrive in Australia until February 1792, and he left in December 1794. Historian Grace Karskens argues that the caption could have been added afterwards, and the writer may have been mistaken about the surgeons being depicted. This seems to be supported by the different spellings of the name Kólbi written on the watercolour.

According to Governor Arthur Phillip, Kólbi once rescued a soldier of the New South Wales Corps. The soldier was travelling from Parramatta with his comrades to acquire sweet sarsaparilla. He left his group to chase a kangaroo, but lost himself in the bush. He eventually came among a group of Aboriginals, most of which fled after seeing his gun. Kólbi, being a frequent visitor of the colonial settlements, understood the soldier's plight. The soldier offered to give Kólbi his clothing, but it was not until he offered his gun that Kólbi agreed to guide the soldier back to safety. Kólbi and his companion led the soldier back to Sydney, and before departing, he gave the soldier his gun back.
