= Maroubra =

Maroubra could refer to:

== People ==
- Moorooboora, an Indigenous Australian Eora leader from the area around what is now called Maroubra, New South Wales

== Places in Australia ==
- Maroubra Beach, a beach in Maroubra, Sydney, Australia
- Maroubra, New South Wales, a suburb in Sydney, Australia
- Maroubra Junction, New South Wales, an unbounded locality of the suburb of Maroubra in Sydney
- Electoral district of Maroubra, an electoral district of the Legislative Assembly in the Australian state of New South Wales

== Genus ==
- Maroubra (fish), a genus of pipefishes
  - Maroubra perserrata
  - Maroubra yasudai

== Army ==
- Maroubra Force, an infantry force that defended Port Moresby
