= Deserter (radio play) =

1956 radio play by William Jenner

- ABC Weekly 7 May 1955
- Genre: drama play
- Running time: 60 mins (8:00 pm – 9:00 pm)
- Country of origin: Australia
- Language: English
- Home station: 2FC
- Syndicates: ABC
- Written by: William Jenner
- Directed by: Leslie Rees
- Original release: May 14, 1955

Deserter is a 1955 Australian radio play by William Jenner.

Jenner was a former sailor who later wrote the radio plays Last Trip, They Sailed on Friday and Stowaways. He wrote it when living on a lighthouse on the Great Barrier Reef.

The play was repeated later in 1955 and produced again in 1956.

== Premise ==
"Joe Belamy is a seaman in the Royal Navy, which he does not like because conditions are so much harder than in the Merchant Navy. So, when an acquaintance, Frank Butler, dies in a street accident, leaving Joe in possession of the man’s papers, Joe decides to desert and join up under Butler’s name in the Merchant Service. He is no shirker. When a bomb his ship in convoy and fails to explode, he volunteers to descend through Uie broken decks and render the bomb harmless. There is talk of the George Cross, but Joe talks the captain out of that. Is he not under an assumed name? While this is a story of adventure, the plight of Joe’s wife and child-ren left at home also occupies the playwright’s attention. Over all, it is a study of an individualist, who loves his family but pleases himself what he does."
