= Matthew Flinders' Cat =

2002 novel by Bryce Courtenay

- First edition
- Author: Bryce Courtenay
- Subject: Australian fiction, homeless persons
- Genre: Adult fiction
- Set in: Sydney
- Publisher: Penguin Books Australia Ltd
- Publication date: 2002
- ISBN: 0670910619

Matthew Flinders' Cat is a 2002 novel by Bryce Courtenay (ISBN 0670910619), published by Viking Press. It records the relationship between a homeless former lawyer and alcoholic, and a young skateboard riding boy with a troubled background, who slowly bond over tales of Matthew Flinders and "Trim", the ship's cat who travelled with him on a number of his voyages, including the circumnavigation of Australia.

Reviewer Charles Waterstreet, felt that the characters in the novel were "created from the comics, not the mind", and that the story was "distilled from headlines writ small, the novel's equivalent of elevator music".
