= Bungaree =

Indigenous Australian explorer and celebrity

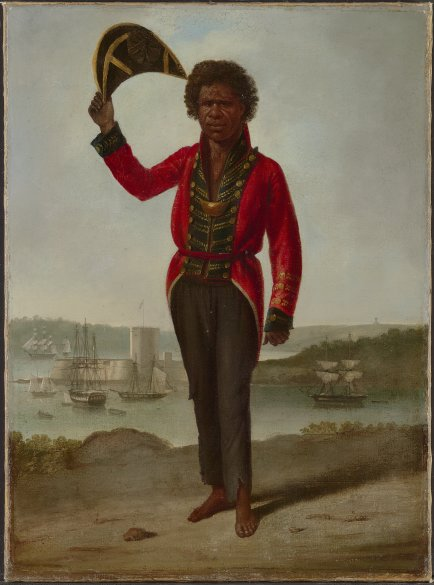
1826 portrait of Bungaree by Augustus Earle

Bungaree, or Boongaree (c. 1775 – 24 November 1830), was an Indigenous Australian Awabakal man from the Broken Bay and Central Coast region north of Sydney, who was known as an explorer, entertainer, and Aboriginal community leader. He is also significant in that he was the first person to be recorded as an Australian, and the first Australian-born person to circumnavigate the Australian mainland.

== Early life ==
Bungaree was probably born around 1775 north of the Broken Bay region of New South Wales. His father was a man possibly of the Garigal clan, while his mother is likely to have been an Awabakal woman from the lower Hunter River area.

== Voyage to Norfolk Island ==
When Bungaree moved to the growing settlement of Sydney in the 1790s, he established himself as a well-known identity able to move between his own people and the newcomers. He joined the crew of HMS Reliance with another keen Indigenous mariner named Nanbaree on a trip to Norfolk Island in 1798, during which he impressed Matthew Flinders.

== Voyage to Hervey Bay ==
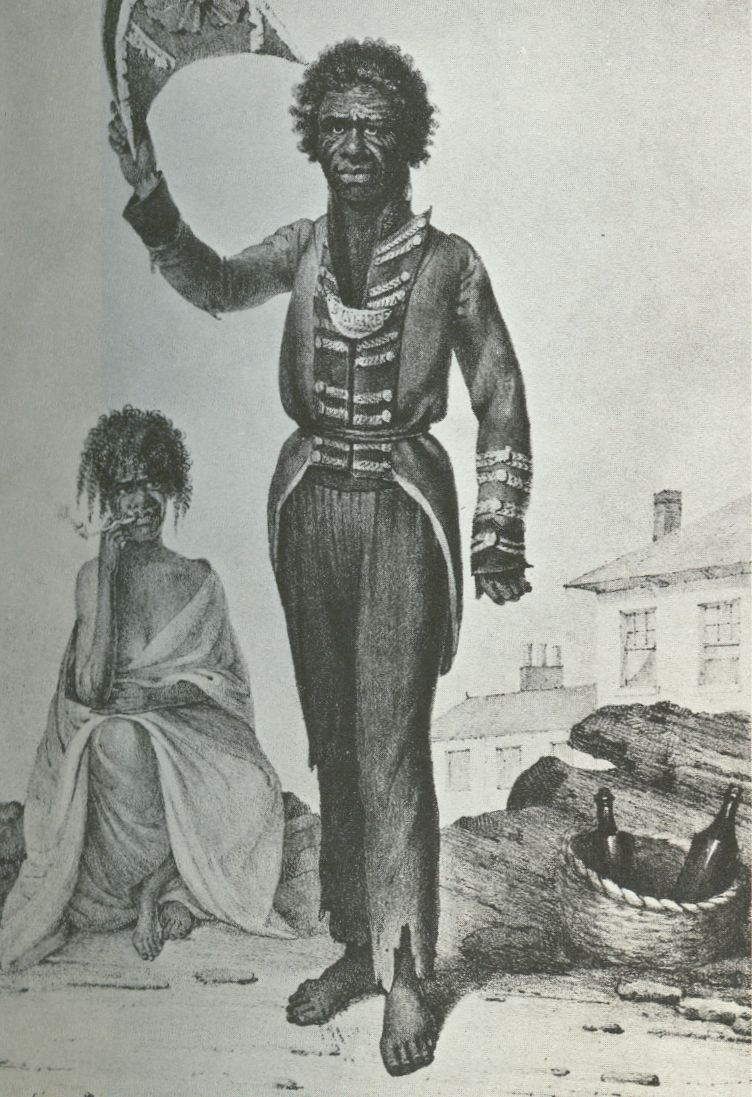
Bungaree with one of his wives

In 1799 he accompanied Flinders (and his brother, Samuel Ward Flinders, a midshipman from the Reliance) on a coastal survey voyage in the sloop Norfolk to Hervey Bay. Bungaree acted as an interpreter, guide and negotiator with local Indigenous groups.

Despite the lack of a common language, the local Indigenous people they met on the journey persistently sought out Bungaree to speak to rather than Flinders, and his mediation skills were greatly appreciated by the British with whom he shared the ship. To reach an agreement with local people in one particular situation, Bungaree gave them a spear and a spear thrower as gifts, showing them how to use them. It is referred to by Bronwen Douglas as a "cross-cultural act, signifying a reciprocal rather than a hierarchical relationship and challenging the reified notion of 'cross-cultural' as contact between opposed, homogenized 'cultures'", adding that "the Moreton Bay people probably took Bungaree for the leader of the expedition and the white men for his followers".

During the voyage, Flinders and Bungaree went ashore at Bribie Island, where Bungaree attempted to interact with the local Djindubari people. A dispute over a hat resulted in the ship's sailors firing at the Djindubari, which Bungaree later reported as resulting in the wounding of two men. The place became known as Point Skirmish and a later settlement nearby was named Bongaree after Bungaree.

== Circumnavigation of Australia with Matthew Flinders ==
Bungaree was again recruited by Flinders to accompany him on his circumnavigation of Australia in Investigator, between 1802 and 1803. Flinders was an enthusiastic explorer and the most prominent advocate for naming the continent "Australia". He noted that Bungaree was "a worthy and brave fellow" who, on a number of occasions, proved vital to the expedition.

Bungaree was not the only Indigenous Australian on the expedition, with the Cadigal youth Nanbaree also joining the crew, having previously sailed with Flinders and Bungaree on HMS Reliance. However, Nanbaree became homesick upon reaching the Cumberland Islands and returned to Sydney on a supply ship.

Bungaree continued on the voyage and played a vital diplomatic role as the expedition made its way around the coast, overcoming considerable language barriers in places. According to historian Keith Vincent Smith, Bungaree chose the role as a go-between, and was often able to mollify Indigenous people who were about to attack the sailors, by taking off his clothes and speaking to people, despite being in territory unknown to himself. In his memoirs, Flinders wrote of Bungaree's "good disposition and open and manly conduct" and his kindness to the ship's cat, Trim.

The expedition landed at several places along what is now the Queensland and Northern Territory coastline. Bungaree successfully interacted and initiated peaceful meetings with the various local Indigenous people at places such as K'gari, Shoalwater Bay and Caledon Bay. He was also onboard when the expedition encountered Pobasso and his Makassan trepang fishing fleet on the northern shores of Arnhem Land.

With much of his crew suffering from scurvy, Flinders sailed to the Dutch colony at Timor, where Bungaree and the others recuperated for a week. The Investigator then rapidly circumnavigated the remaining part of Australia offshore, only stopping at the Recherche Archipelago before returning to Sydney. Bungaree thus became the first Australian-born person to circumnavigate the continent.

== Newcastle ==
In 1804, Bungaree was sent by Governor Philip Gidley King to the newly re-opened convict settlement at the mouth of the Hunter River named King's Town, now called Newcastle. Bungaree's mother was a local of the region and therefore Bungaree had strong links with the resident Awabakal people. Indeed, Bungaree had been sent by Governor King in 1801 to create dialogue with the Awabakal as part of the original expedition to establish the settlement, but upon arrival Bungaree abandoned the British to be with his mother's people.

By 1804, the Newcastle convict settlement housed dozens of mostly Irish dissidents captured during the Castle Hill convict rebellion. Bungaree was employed by the settlement's superintendent, Charles Menzies, to act as intermediary between the Awabakal and the colonists. He was also utilised to track down runaway convicts. Menzies praised Bungaree's work, writing that he enabled "the most friendly terms" between the British and the Awabakal, and that he was "the most intelligent of that race".

However, Bungaree's role in capturing armed convicts proved tragic for his family, with his own father being killed in "the most brutal manner" by runaway convicts on their way to Sydney.

Bungaree probably remained in the Newcastle area until around 1808 before returning to the Sydney region.

== Recognised as a "Chief" and awarded a land grant ==
Bungaree
- Chief of the Broken Bay Tribe; King of Port Jackson; King of the Blacks
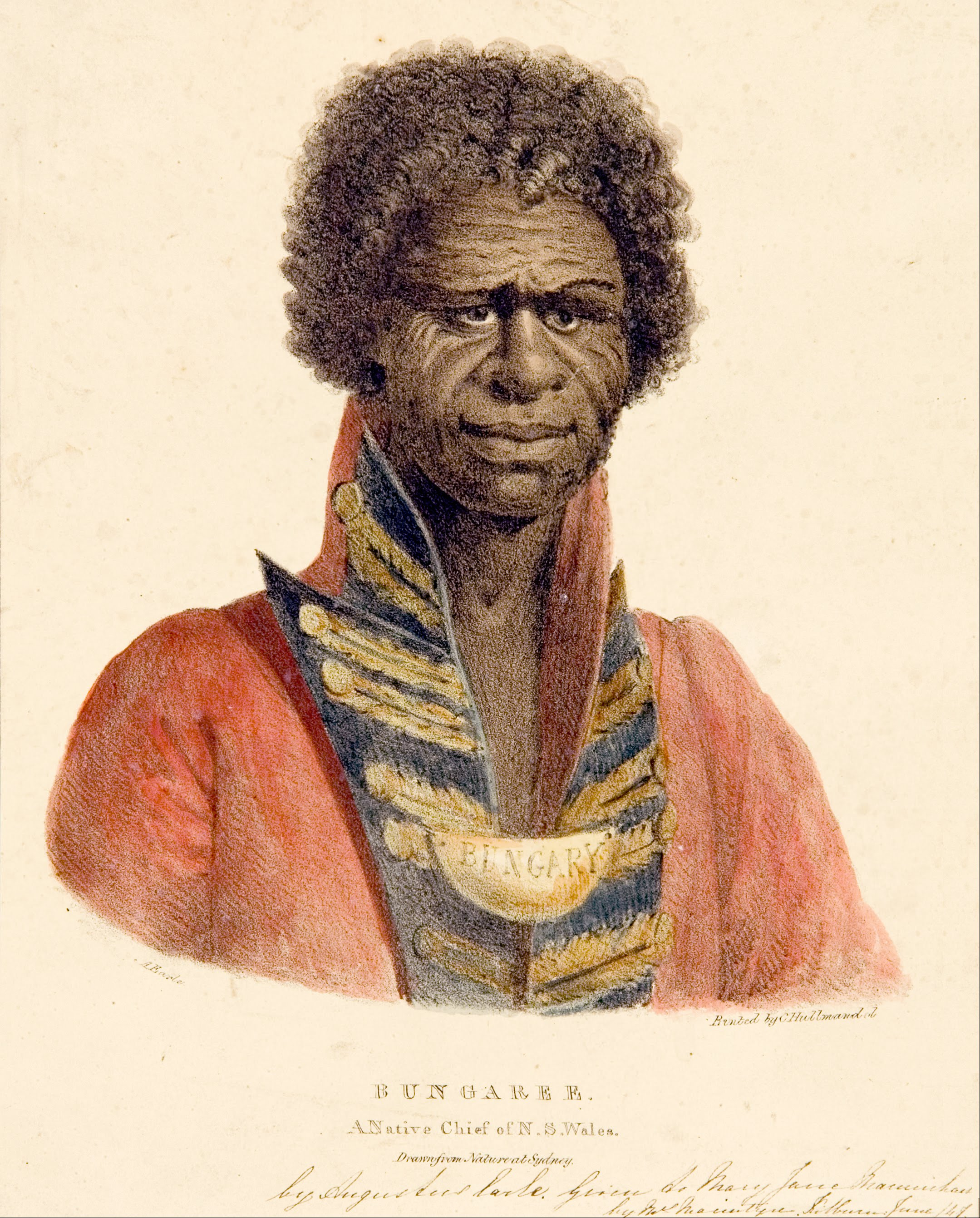
- Portrait by Augustus Earle
- Reign: 1815 – 1830
- Born: Boongaree c. 1775; New South Wales
- Died: 24 November 1830; Garden Island
- Burial: Rose Bay
- Consort: Cora Gooseberry
- Spouses: Matroa
- Issue: Boin (Bowen) Bungaree; one son; one daughter
- Occupation: Explorer, Entertainer

In 1815, Governor Lachlan Macquarie dubbed Bungaree "Chief of the Broken Bay Tribe" and presented him with 15 acres (61,000 m^{2}) of land on Georges Head, as well as a breastplate inscribed "BOONGAREE – Chief of the Broken Bay Tribe – 1815". Bungaree was also known by the titles "King of Port Jackson" and "King of the Blacks", with one of his wives, Cora Gooseberry, known as his queen.

His other main wife was Matora, with whom Bungaree had at least one daughter and two sons. Their eldest son was named Boin (Bowen) Bungaree, who also became a noted identity and traveller, voyaging to San Francisco to join the California gold rush.

== Voyage to North-Western Australia ==
Bungaree continued his association with exploratory voyages when he accompanied Captain Phillip Parker King to north-western Australia in 1818 in the Mermaid. Amongst other things, Bungaree acted as an interlocutor with the Indigenous people encountered, gave advice on which plants were safe to eat, led the crew to fresh water and also, being an expert fisherman, provided seafood for the ship.

Captain King described Bungaree as "sharp, intelligent and unassuming". When the expedition had to go to Timor for supplies, Bungaree (who had been there as part of Matthew Flinders' voyage fifteen years beforehand) demanded facetiously the change he had not been given for a glass of gin he bought there in 1803.

== Later life ==
Bungaree spent the rest of his life ceremonially welcoming visitors to Australia, educating people about Aboriginal culture (especially boomerang throwing), and soliciting tribute, especially from ships visiting Sydney. He was also influential within his own community, taking part in corroborees, trading in fish, and helping to keep the peace. Captain Faddei Bellingshausen referred to Bungaree's welcoming visit to the Russian exploration ship Vostok in 1820.

By the end of his life, he had become a familiar sight in colonial Sydney, dressed in a succession of military and naval uniforms that had been given to him. His distinctive outfits and notoriety within colonial society, as well as his gift for humour and mimicry, especially his impressions of past and present governors, made him a popular subject for portrait painters, with eighteen portraits and half a dozen incidental appearances in wider landscapes or groupings of figures. His were among the first full-length oil portraits to be painted in the colony, and the first to be published as a lithograph.

== Death ==
In 1828, he and his clan moved to the Governor's Domain, and were given rations, with Bungaree described as 'in the last stages of human infirmity'. He died at Garden Island on 24 November 1830 and was buried in Rose Bay next to the grave of his first wife, Matora. Obituaries of him were carried in the Sydney Gazette and The Australian.

In 1857, it appears that the skull of Bungaree (or possibly that of his son Bo-un "Bowen" Bungaree) was removed from his grave to be used as a museum-piece. What happened to the skull is unknown, but in 1919 a wooden box containing the skull of an Aboriginal man was dug up on Rose Bay beach. Rose Bay was a significant Indigenous burial site with multiple disinterments occurring over the years with the various redevelopments of the Royal Sydney Golf Club located there.

== Legacy ==
- Boongaree Island, located off the Kimberley coast of Western Australia, was named after him by Captain King in 1820.
- The suburb of Bongaree, Queensland, is named after him.
- Norah Head was originally named Bungaree's Norah by the British in honour of Bungaree. The main road of the town, Bungary Road, is also named after him.
- Bungaree Road in Toongabbie, New South Wales is named after him.
- HMAS Bungaree, originally built in Dundee as a cargo vessel in 1937 for the Adelaide Steamship Company, but commissioned by the Royal Australian Navy after conversion into a minelayer in June 1941 at Garden Island, Sydney, was named after him.
- In 2017, a Sydney Ferries Emerald-class ferry was named Bungaree.
- A primary school was named Bungaree in late 1960's in the suburb of Rockingham, Western Australia.
- However, Bungaree's important role in the exploration of Australia appears to have been almost forgotten. There are statues to Flinders and the cat Trim, but as at January 2019, not a single statue to Bungaree recognizing his achievements. On November 28 2023, a sculpture honouring Bungaree was unveiled at Bongaree on Bribie Island. The sculpture included Flinders and the cat 'Trim'. It is located at the Seaside Museum at the Pumicestone Passage side of the island.

== See also ==
- List of Indigenous Australian historical figures

== Sources ==
- Pollon, F. (ed.) [1988] (1996). The Book of Sydney Suburbs, Angus & Robertson Publishers: Sydney. ISBN 0-207-19007-0.
- Smith, Keith Vincent, (1992) King Bungaree, Kangaroo Press, Kenthurst. ISBN 0 86417 470 5.
