= Flinders bar =

A Flinders bar is a vertical soft iron bar placed in a tube typically on the fore side of a compass binnacle. The Flinders bar is used to counteract the horizontal effect of vertical magnetism induced by the Earth's magnetic field in the steel of a ship, an effect which varies with latitude. It is usually calibrated as part of the process known as swinging the compass or compass adjustment, where compass deviations caused by the ship's magnetism are negated by the use of various permanent and induced magnets in close proximity to the compass, called correctors.

Where the deviation from a compass point cannot be counteracted through the use of Flinders bar, Kelvin's balls (aka quadrantal spheres), heeling error magnets, and horizontal magnets, a deviation card or graph is produced. This card, or graph, lists the deviation for various compass courses and is referred to by the navigator when compass courses need to be corrected.

It is named after the English navigator Matthew Flinders (1774-1814) who wrote a paper on ships' magnetism for the Royal Navy. He discovered the addition of a bar of iron would compensate for errors caused by his cargo during his travels to Australia.
