= Cora Gooseberry =

Aboriginal Australian Murro-ore-dial woman and cultural knowledge keeper

- Caroo
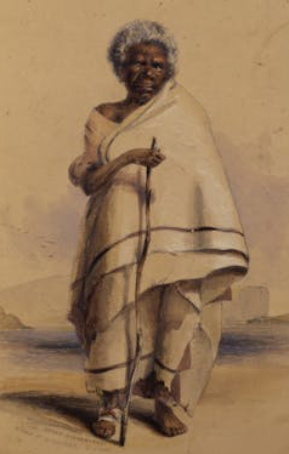
- 1845 portrait of Cora Gooseberry by George French Angas
- Born: Caroo c. 1777
- Died: July 30, 1852 (aged 74–75); Sydney, Australia
- Body discovered: Sydney Arms Hotel, Castlereagh Street
- Other names: Queen Gooseberry; Lady Gooseberry
- Occupations: Clan monarch cultural knowledge keeper
- Spouse: Bungaree (w. 1830)
- Parent: Moorooboora (father)

Cora Gooseberry (also known as Queen Gooseberry and Lady Bungaree; (Note: Also recorded as Kaaroo, Carra, Caroo, Car-roo or Ba-ran-gan. Her native name was Caroo.) c. 1777 – 30 July 1852) was an Indigenous Australian woman and cultural knowledge keeper of the Murro-ore-dial clan of the Eora nation. In popular culture, she is often depicted smoking a pipe and wearing a scarf on her head. She received two breastplates, one of which was inscribed "Cora Gooseberry/ Freeman/ Bungaree / Queen of Sydney and Botany". It is held by the Mitchell Library.

== Early life ==
Cora Gooseberry was born Caroo, her given Aboriginal Australian name, circa 1777. She was the daughter of Moorooboora (also known as Maroubra; circa 1758–1798), an important man of the Murro-ore-dial (Pathway Place) clan from what is now the Maroubra area of eastern Sydney, Australia.

== Personal life ==
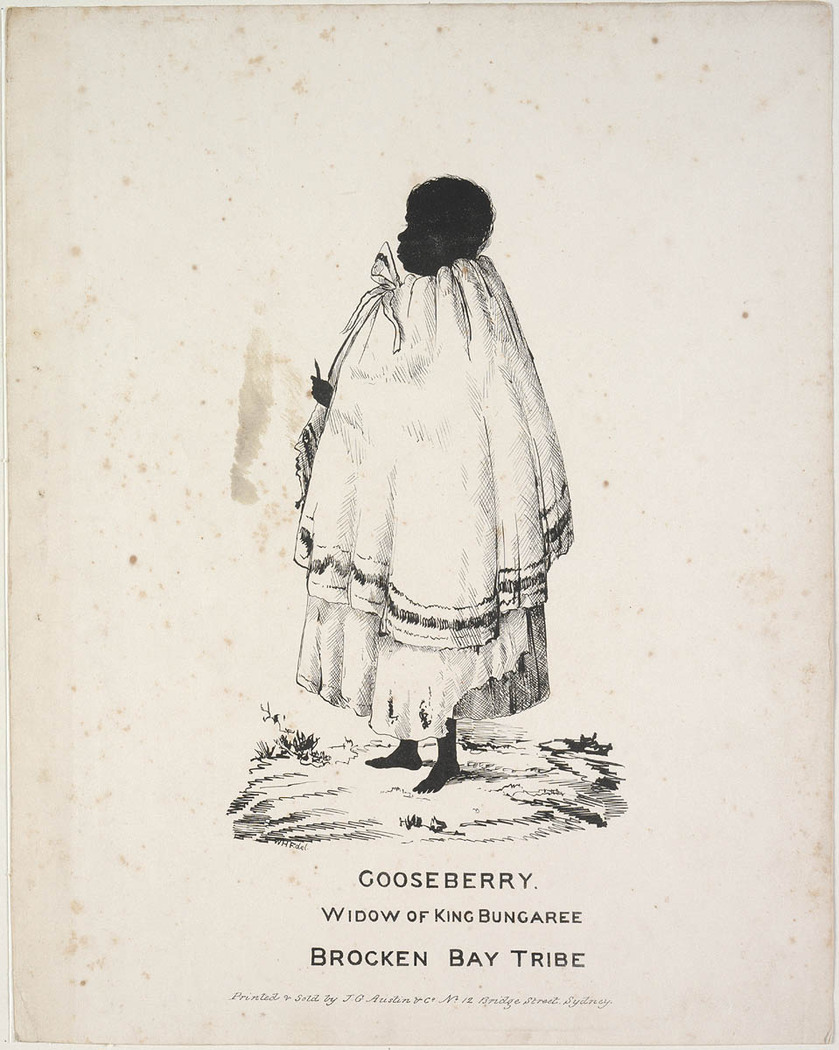
Cora Gooseberry

Cora was one of the two known wives of the notable Aboriginal explorer and celebrity Bungaree. After Bungaree's first wife, Matora, died in the mid-1820s, Cora became Bungaree's principal wife and the couple were readily identified in Sydney as the "king" and "queen" of the local Aboriginal population.

Bungaree and Cora were associated with a group of surviving Indigenous people from a number of coastal clans of the Sydney, Central Coast and Newcastle regions. They camped at various places along the eastern harbour, such as Georges Head, Rose Bay, Camp Cove, The Domain and Elizabeth Bay. Camp Cove in particular was a favourite place of residence, attracting up to a few hundred Indigenous people at any one time due to its fishing and cultural importance.

Cora and Bungaree may not have had any children together, but Cora helped raise a son named Boin (better known as Bowen Bungaree) that Bungaree had with his other wife Matora. Cora was widowed after Bungaree's death in 1830. After the death of her husband Bungaree in 1830, Cora Gooseberry became a leader among a regrouped band.

Cora continued living with other Aboriginal people at places such as Camp Cove into her older years, retaining cultural knowledge of the coastal Sydney area, only some of which she guardedly shared with enquiring British people.

In the last few years of her life, she moved into the city, where she became a resident at the hotels owned by her ex-convict friend named Edward Borton.

== Death ==
On 30 July 1852, Cora Gooseberry was found dead at the Sydney Arms Hotel in Castlereagh Street, Sydney, New South Wales, Australia. According to her coroner's verdict, she had died of natural causes. She was buried in the Presbyterian section of the Sandhills cemetery, but her tombstone was relocated shortly afterwards. It is now located in Pioneers Cemetery, Botany.
