= Last Trip =

1956 radio play by William Jenner

- Genre: drama play
- Running time: 50 mins (4:10 pm – 5:00 pm)
- Country of origin: Australia
- Language: English
- Home station: 2FC
- Syndicates: ABC
- Written by: William Jenner
- Original release: March 12, 1956

Last Trip is a 1956 Australian radio play by William Jenner. It aired as part of a special week of Australian plays on the ABC scheduled by Leslie Rees. Jenner was a former sailor who had previously written Deserter for the ABC.

The play was performed by Sydney and Brisbane casts. The ABC considered it one of its major radio plays of the year.

The Age said "condensation was rather tight".

== Premise ==
"There is Tug, an easy-going Casanova, rather selfish and self-centred, and Bally, his mate, more serious and sincere, very much in love with his new wife and waiting for the day when he can afford to retire from the sea and become a domesticated householder. Bally takes Tug home to meet Gwen, his wife. They show no signs of recognition, but Gwen seems to take a dislike to Tug In actual fact, and unknown to Bally, she and Tug once knew each other very well indeed. It is a situation in which a slight stroke of ill-luck could bring about tragedy."

== Cast of Sydney production ==
- Guy Doleman as Tug
- Reg Lye as Bally
- Ron Whelan as Nugget
- Georgie Sterling as Gwen
- Walter Sullivan as Mate Agent
- Jerrold Wells as Bosun
- George Simpson Lvttle as Captain Collector >
- Don Crosby as Driver, Officer
- Rupert Chance as Helmsman Porter
- Albert Garcia as Seaman
- Richard Ashley
- Frances Worthington as Woman

== Cast of Brisbane production ==
- John Nash as Tug
- Arthur Greenfield as Bally
- Toby Harris as Nugget
- Yolanthe Slater as Gwen
- John Miller as Mate
- John Bowen as Bosun
- John Barrie as Driver Officer
- Jan Keran as Helmsman Seaman
- Harry Cotterrell as Porter
- Hector Lawrence as Collector and Seaman
- Christine Low as Woman
- Arthur Hall as Stewart
