= HMAS Flinders =

Two ships of the Royal Australian Navy (RAN) have been named HMAS Flinders, after Matthew Flinders.

- HMAS Flinders (GS 312), a hydrographic survey ship in service from 1973 to 1998.
- HMAS Flinders (FFG), a Hunter-class frigate that is expected to enter service in the late 2020s.

== See also ==
- HMAS Cerberus (naval base) was known as the Flinders Naval Depot until 1921
