= Matthew Flinders =

Royal Navy officer, navigator and cartographer (1774–1814)

Captain Matthew Flinders
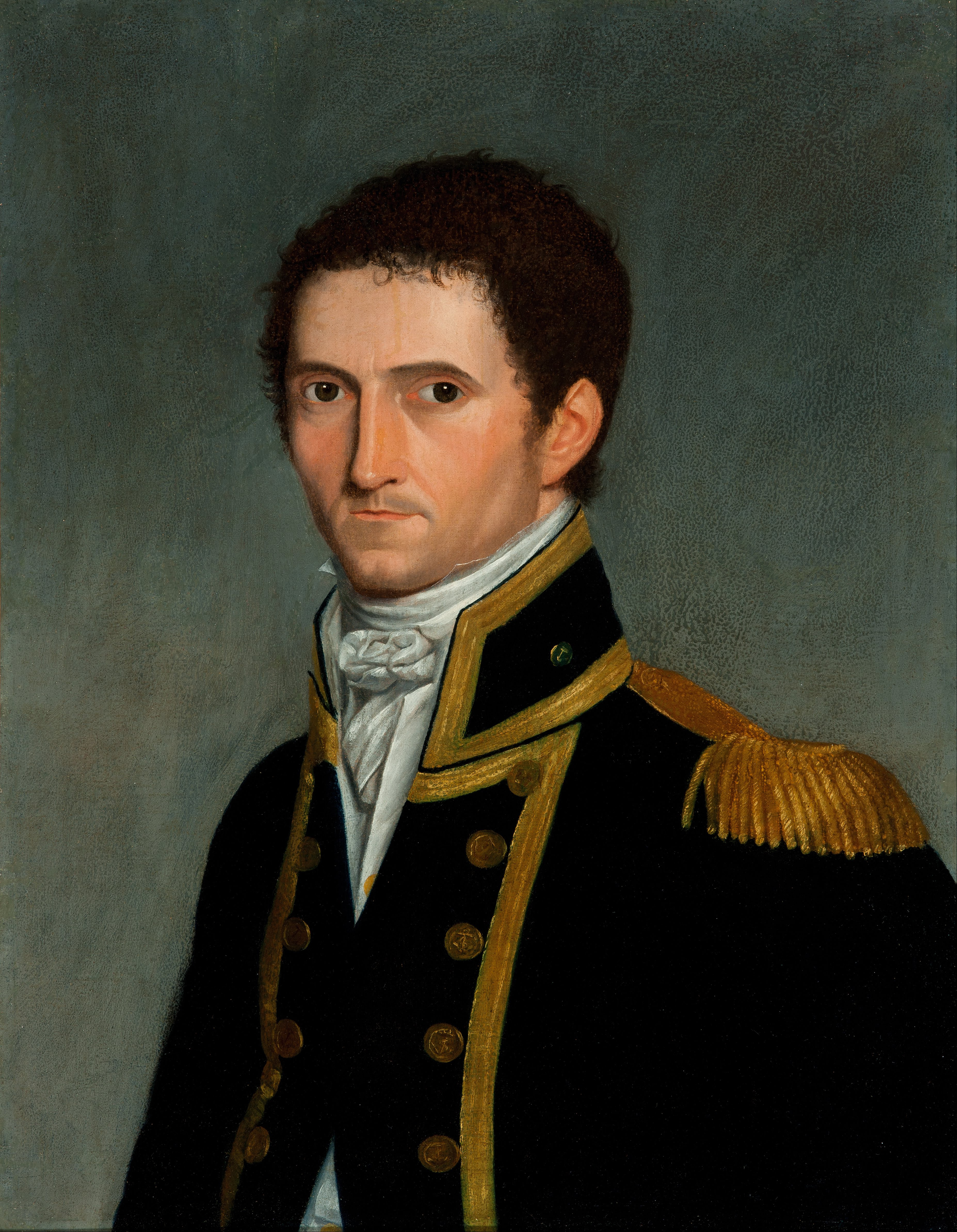
- Portrait by Antoine Toussaint de Chazal, c. 1806–1807
- Born: 16 March 1774; Donington, Lincolnshire, England
- Died: 19 July 1814 (aged 40); London, Middlesex, England
- Burial place: Church of St Mary and the Holy Rood, Donington
- Spouse: Ann Chappelle (m. 1801)
- Children: 1
- Military career
- Allegiance: Great Britain; United Kingdom
- Branch: Royal Navy
- Service years: 1789–1814
- Rank: Captain
- Units: HMS Alert; HMS Scipio; HMS Bellerophon; HMS Providence; HMS Reliance; HMS Investigator
- Conflicts: French Revolutionary Wars; War of the First Coalition; Glorious First of June; Napoleonic Wars

Captain Matthew Flinders (16 March 1774 – 19 July 1814) was a British Royal Navy officer, navigator and cartographer who led the first inshore circumnavigation of mainland Australia, then called New Holland. He is also credited as being the first person to utilise the name Australia to describe the entirety of that continent including Van Diemen's Land (now Tasmania), a title he regarded as being "more agreeable to the ear" than previous names such as Terra Australis.

Flinders was involved in several voyages of discovery between 1791 and 1803, the most famous of which are the circumnavigation of Australia and an earlier expedition when he and George Bass confirmed that Van Diemen's Land was an island. While returning to Britain in 1803, Flinders was arrested by the French at the colony of Isle de France. Although Britain and France were at war, Flinders thought the scientific nature of his work would ensure safe passage, but he remained under arrest for more than six years. In captivity, he recorded details of his voyages for future publication, and put forward his rationale for naming the new continent Australia, as an umbrella term for New Holland and New South Wales – a suggestion taken up later by Governor Macquarie.

Flinders' health had suffered, however, and although he returned to Britain in 1810, he did not live to see the success of his widely praised book and atlas, A Voyage to Terra Australis. The location of his grave had been lost by the mid-19th century, but archaeologists, excavating a former burial ground near London's Euston railway station for the High Speed 2 rail project, announced in January 2019 that his remains had been identified. On 13 July 2024, he was reburied in Donington, Lincolnshire, the village of his birth.

== Early life ==
Matthew Flinders was born in Donington, Lincolnshire, the son of Matthew Flinders, a surgeon, and his wife Susannah (née Ward). He was educated at Cowley's Charity School, Donington, from 1780 and then at the Reverend John Shinglar's Grammar School at Horbling in Lincolnshire.

In his own words, he was "induced to go to sea against the wishes of my friends from reading Robinson Crusoe", and in 1789, at the age of fifteen, he joined the Royal Navy. Under the patronage of Captain Thomas Pasley, Flinders was initially assigned to HMS Alert as a servant, but was soon transferred as an able-seaman to HMS Scipio, and then in July 1790 was made midshipman on HMS Bellerophon.

== Early career ==
=== Midshipman to Captain Bligh ===
In May 1791, on Pasley's recommendation, Flinders joined Captain William Bligh's expedition on HMS Providence transporting breadfruit from Tahiti to Jamaica. It was Bligh's second "Breadfruit Voyage", following his ill-fated voyage on HMS Bounty. The expedition sailed via the Cape of Good Hope and, in February 1792, they arrived at Adventure Bay on the eastern coast of Bruny Island off the south-eastern coast of the island now known as Tasmania. The officers and crew spent over a week in the region obtaining water and lumber, and interacting with local Aboriginal people. It was Flinders' first association with any of the land which is now part of the Commonwealth of Australia.

After the expedition arrived in Tahiti in April 1792, obtaining the breadfruit plants to take to Jamaica, they sailed back west. Instead of travelling via Adventure Bay, Bligh navigated to the north of the Australian continent, sailing through the Torres Strait. There, off Zagai Island, they were involved in a naval skirmish with armed local men in a flotilla of sailing canoes, which resulted in the death of several Islanders and one crewman. The expedition arrived in Jamaica in February 1793, offloading the breadfruit plants, and then returned to England, with Flinders disembarking in London in August 1793 after more than two years at sea.

=== HMS Bellerophon ===
In September 1793, Flinders re-joined HMS Bellerophon, which was captained by Pasley. In 1794, Flinders served on this vessel during the battle known as the Glorious First of June, the first and largest fleet action of the French Revolutionary Wars. Flinders wrote a detailed journal of the battle which described Pasley as having "lost his leg by an 18-pounder shot which came in through the barricadoes of the quarter-deck". Both Pasley and Flinders survived, with Flinders deciding to pursue a preference for exploratory rather than military naval assignments.

== Exploration around New South Wales ==
Flinders' desire for adventure led him to enlist as a midshipman aboard HMS Reliance in 1795. This vessel was headed to New South Wales carrying the recently appointed governor of that British colony, Captain John Hunter. On this voyage Flinders became friends with the ship's surgeon George Bass who was three years his senior and had been born at Aswarby, just 18 kilometres (11 mi) from Donington.

=== Expeditions in Tom Thumb and Tom Thumb II ===
Reliance arrived in Port Jackson in September 1795, and Bass and Flinders soon organised an expedition in a small open boat named Tom Thumb, in which they sailed with a boy, William Martin, to Botany Bay and up the Georges River. In March 1796, the two explorers, again with William Martin, set out on another voyage in a larger boat, dubbed Tom Thumb II. They sailed south from Port Jackson but were soon forced to beach at Red Point (Port Kembla). There, they accepted the help of two Aboriginal men who piloted the boat to the entrance of Lake Illawarra, where they were able to dry their gunpowder and obtain supplies of water from another group of Aboriginal people. During the return to Sydney, they had to seek shelter at Wattamolla and also explored some of Port Hacking (Deeban).

=== Circumnavigation of Van Diemen's Land ===
Chart of Van Diemen's Land (now called Tasmania) produced by Matthew Flinders

In 1798, Flinders, by then a lieutenant, was given command of the sloop Norfolk with orders "to sail beyond Furneaux's Islands, and, should a strait be found, pass through it, and return by the south end of Van Diemen's Land". Flinders and Bass had, in the months previously, both made separate journeys exploring the region but neither were conclusive as to the existence of a strait. Flinders, with Bass and several crewmen, sailed Norfolk along the uncharted northern and western coasts of Van Diemen's Land, rounded Cape Pillar and returned to Furneaux's Islands. By doing so, Flinders had completed the circumnavigation of Van Diemen's Land and confirmed the presence of a strait between it and the mainland. The passage was named Bass Strait after his close friend, and the largest island in the strait would later be named Flinders Island in his honour. During the voyage, Flinders and Bass rowed the ship's dinghy for some miles up the River Derwent, where they had their only encounter with Aboriginal Tasmanians.

=== Expedition to Hervey Bay ===
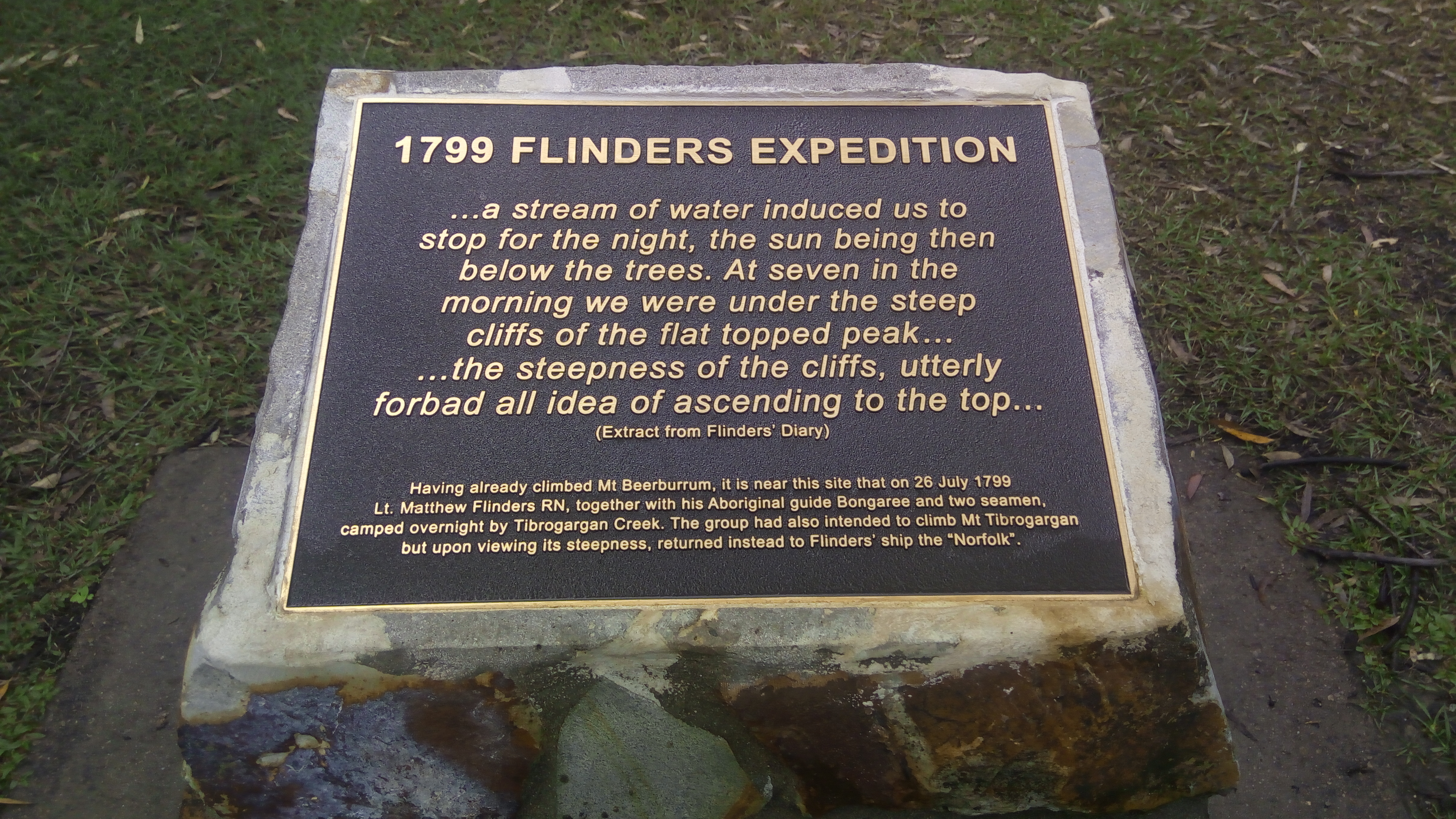
1799 Flinders Expedition plaque at Mount Beerburrum, one of the Glass House Mountains in Queensland, Australia

In 1799, Flinders' request to explore the coast north of Port Jackson was granted and, once more, the sloop Norfolk was assigned to him. Bass had returned to Britain by that time and, in his place, Flinders recruited his brother Samuel Flinders and was also accompanied on the voyage by a Indigenous Australian man named Bungaree. They departed on 8 July 1799 and arrived in Moreton Bay six days later. Flinders rowed ashore at Woody Point (27.2632°S 153.1039°E) and named a point 3.2 kilometres (2 mi) west of that (27.2628°S 153.0792°E) as Redcliffe (on account of its red cliffs). That point is now known as Clontarf Point, while the name Redcliffe is used by the town of Redcliffe to the north. He landed on Coochiemudlo Island (27.5703°S 153.3331°E) on 19 July while he was searching for a river in the southern part of Moreton Bay.

In the northern part of Moreton Bay, Flinders explored a narrow waterway (27.0705°S 153.1429°E) which he named the Pumice Stone River (presumably unaware it separated Bribie Island and the mainland); it is now called the Pumicestone Passage. Most of the meetings between the Aboriginal people of Moreton Bay and Flinders were of a friendly nature, but on 15 July at the southern tip of Bribie Island, a spear was thrown which resulted in a local man being wounded by gunfire. Flinders named the place where this occurred Point Skirmish. While anchored in Pumicestone, Flinders ventured several kilometres overland with three crew including Bungaree and climbed the mountain Beerburrum. They turned back after meeting the steep cliffs of Mount Tibrogargan on about 26 July.

Exiting Moreton Bay, Flinders continued north exploring as far as Hervey Bay before returning south. They arrived back in Sydney on 20 August 1799.

== Command of Investigator ==
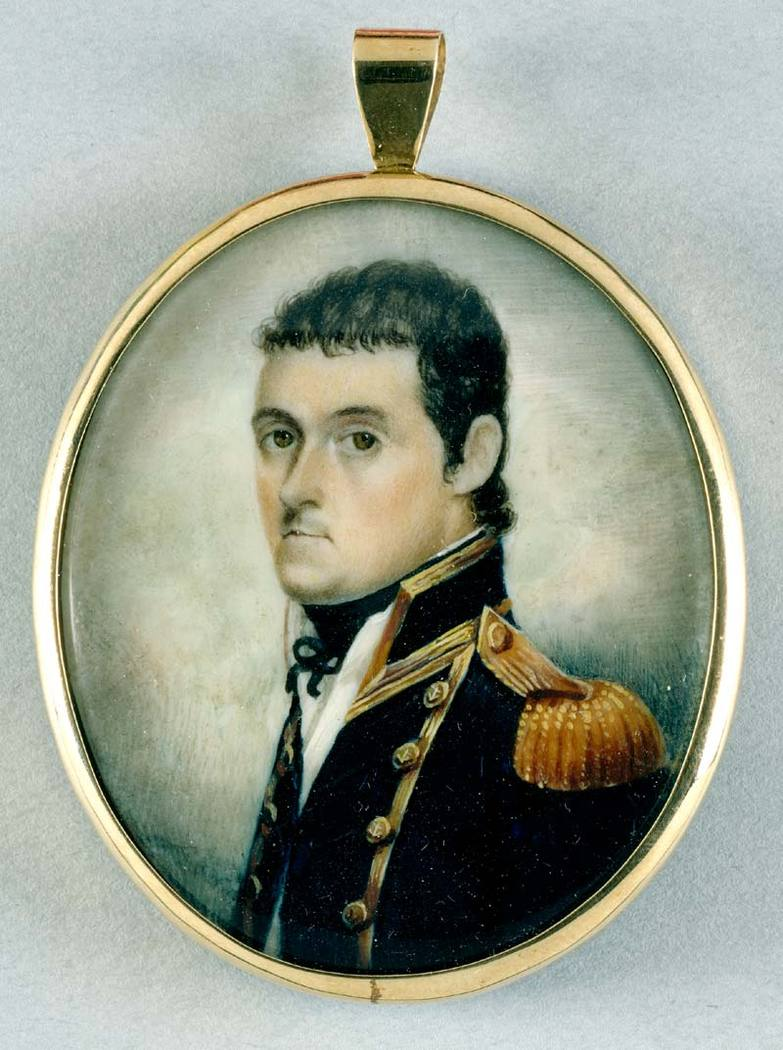
Flinders in 1801, a miniature portrait on ivory

In March 1800, Flinders rejoined Reliance and returned to Britain. During the voyage, the Antipodes Islands were discovered and charted. Flinders' work had come to the attention of many of the scientists of the day, in particular the influential Sir Joseph Banks, to whom Flinders dedicated his Observations on the Coasts of Van Diemen's Land, on Bass's Strait, etc.. Banks used his influence with Earl Spencer to convince the Admiralty of the importance of an expedition to chart the coastline of New Holland. As a result, in January 1801, Flinders was given command of HMS Investigator, a 334-ton sloop, and promoted to commander the following month.

Investigator set sail for New Holland on 18 July 1801. Attached to the expedition were the botanist Robert Brown, botanical artist Ferdinand Bauer, landscape artist William Westall, gardener Peter Good, geological assistant John Allen, and John Crosley as astronomer. Vallance et al. comment that compared to the Baudin expedition this was a "modest contingent of scientific gentlemen", which reflects "British parsimony" in scientific endeavour. The future explorer John Franklin, Flinders' cousin by marriage, served as midshipman.

== Exploration of the Australian coastline ==
=== Surveying the southern coast ===
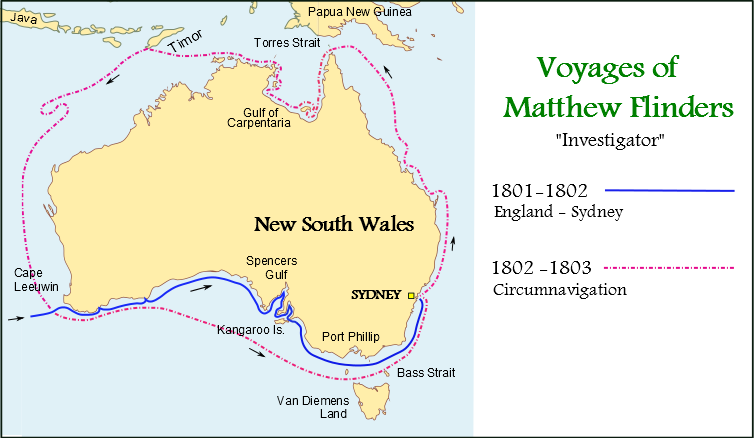
The voyages of Flinders aboard HMS Investigator

Aboard Investigator, Flinders reached and named Cape Leeuwin on 6 December 1801, and proceeded to make a survey along the southern coast of the Australian mainland. The expedition soon anchored in King George Sound and stayed there for a month exploring the area. The local Aboriginal people initially indicated that Flinders' group should "return from whence they came", but relations improved to the point where one resident participated in musket-drill with the ship's marines. In nearby Oyster Harbour, Flinders found a copper plate that Captain Christopher Dixson, on Elligood, had left the year before.

While approaching Port Lincoln, which Flinders named after his home county of Lincolnshire, eight of his crew were lost when the sailing cutter, in which they were attempting to return to the ship after an expedition to the mainland, capsized. Flinders named nearby Memory Cove in their honour. On 21 March 1802, the expedition reached a large island where many kangaroos were sighted. Flinders and some crew went ashore and found the animals so tame they could walk right up to them. They killed 31 kangaroos with Flinders writing that "in gratitude for so seasonable a supply [of meat], I named this southern land Kangaroo Island." The seals on the island proved less docile, with a crew member receiving a severe bite from one.

On 8 April 1802, while sailing east, Flinders sighted Géographe, a French corvette commanded by the explorer Nicolas Baudin, who was on a similar expedition for his government. Both men of science, Flinders and Baudin exchanged details of their discoveries, despite believing that their countries were at war. Flinders named the bay in which they met Encounter Bay.

Proceeding along the coast, Flinders explored Port Phillip (the site of the future city of Melbourne), which, unknown to him, had been explored only ten weeks earlier by John Murray aboard HMS Lady Nelson. Flinders scaled Arthur's Seat, the highest point near the shores of the southernmost parts of the bay, and wrote that the land had "a pleasing and, in many parts, a fertile appearance". After scaling the You Yangs to the northwest of Port Phillip on 1 May, he left a scroll of paper with the ship's name on it and deposited it in a small pile of stones at the top of the peak.

With stores running low, Flinders proceeded to Sydney, arriving on 9 May 1802.

=== Circumnavigation of Australia ===
Flinders spent 12 weeks and 2 days in Sydney resupplying and enlisting further crew for the continuation of the expedition to the northern coast of Australia. Bungaree, an Aboriginal man who had accompanied him on his earlier coastal survey in 1799, joined the expedition as did another local Aboriginal man named Nanbaree. It was arranged that Captain John Murray and his vessel Lady Nelson would accompany Investigator as a supply ship on this voyage.

Flinders set sail again on 22 July 1802, heading north and surveying the coast of what would later be called Queensland. They soon anchored at Sandy Cape where they, with Bungaree acting as a mediator, feasted on porpoise blubber with a group of Batjala people. In early August, Flinders sailed into a bay he named Port Curtis. Here the local people threw stones at them as they attempted to land. Flinders ordered muskets be fired above their heads to disperse them. The expedition continued north but navigation became increasingly difficult as they entered the Great Barrier Reef. For Flinders, the collection of reefs served as a barrier to safe navigation, calling them Barrier Reefs in his 1814 book. Lady Nelson was deemed too unseaworthy to continue, and Captain Murray sailed her back to Sydney with his crew and Nanbaree, who wanted to return home. Flinders exited the reefs near to the Whitsunday Islands and sailed Investigator north to the Torres Strait. On 29 October, they arrived at Murray Island in the east of this strait, where they traded iron for shell necklaces with the local people.

The expedition entered the Gulf of Carpentaria on 4 November and charted the coast to Arnhem Land. At Blue Mud Bay the crew, while collecting timber, had a skirmish with local Aboriginal men. One of the crew received four spear wounds while two of the Aboriginal men were shot dead. At nearby Caledon Bay, Flinders took a 14-year-old boy named Woga captive in order to coerce the local people to return a stolen axe. Although the axe was not returned, Flinders released the boy who had spent a day tied to a tree. On 17 February 1803, near Cape Wilberforce, the expedition encountered a Makassan trepanging fleet captained by a man called Pobasso, from whom Flinders obtained information about the region.

During this part of the voyage, much of Investigator was discovered to be rotten, and Flinders made the decision to complete the circumnavigation of the continent without any further close surveying of the coast. He sailed to Sydney via Timor and the western and southern coasts of Australia. On the way, Flinders jettisoned two wrought-iron anchors which were found by divers in 1973 at Middle Island, Recherche Archipelago, Western Australia. The anchors are on display at the South Australian Maritime Museum in Port Adelaide and at the National Museum of Australia in Canberra.

Arriving in Sydney on 9 June 1803, Investigator was judged to be unseaworthy and condemned.

== Attempted return to England and imprisonment ==
Discussion of Flinders and Nicolas Baudin's race to map Australia

Unable to find another vessel suitable to continue his exploration, Flinders set sail for Britain as a passenger aboard HMS Porpoise. However, the ship was wrecked on Wreck Reefs, part of the Great Barrier Reef, approximately 1,100 kilometres (700 mi) north of Sydney. Flinders navigated the ship's cutter across open sea back to Sydney, and arranged for the rescue of the remaining marooned crew. Flinders then took command of the 29-ton schooner HMS Cumberland in order to return to England, but the poor condition of the vessel forced him to put in at French-controlled Isle de France (now known as Mauritius) for repairs on 17 December 1803, just three months after Baudin had died there.

War with France had broken out again the previous May, but Flinders hoped his French passport (despite its being issued for Investigator and not Cumberland) and the scientific nature of his mission would allow him to continue on his way.

Despite this, and the knowledge of Baudin's earlier encounter with Flinders, the French governor, Charles Mathieu Isidore Decaen, detained Flinders. The relationship between the men soured: Flinders was affronted at his treatment, and Decaen insulted by Flinders' refusal of an invitation to dine with him and his wife. Decaen was suspicious of the alleged scientific mission as Cumberland carried no scientists and Decaen's search of Flinders' vessel uncovered a trunk full of papers (including despatches from the New South Wales Governor Philip Gidley King) that were not permitted under his scientific passport. Furthermore, one of King's despatches was specifically to the British Admiralty requesting more troops in case Decaen were to attack Port Jackson. Among the papers seized were the three logs of HMS Investigator of which only Volume one and Volume two were returned to Flinders; these are now both held by the State Library of New South Wales. The third volume was later deposited in the Admiralty Library and is now held in The National Archives (United Kingdom).

Decaen referred the matter to the French government; this was delayed not only by the long voyage but also by the general confusion of war. Eventually, on 11 March 1806, Napoleon gave his approval, but Decaen still refused to allow Flinders' release. By this stage Decaen believed Flinders' knowledge of the island's defences would have encouraged Britain to attempt to capture it. Nevertheless, in June 1809 the Royal Navy began a blockade of the island, and in June 1810 Flinders was paroled. Travelling via the Cape Colony on Olympia, which was taking despatches back to Britain, he received a promotion to captain, before continuing to England.

Flinders had been confined for the first few months of his captivity, but he was later afforded greater freedom to move around the island and access his papers. In November 1804 he sent the first map of the landmass he had charted (Y46/1) back to England. This was the only map made by Flinders where he used the name Australia or Terra Australis for the title instead of New Holland, the name of the continent that James Cook had used in 1770 and Abel Tasman had coined a Dutch version of in 1644, and the first known time he used the word Australia. He used the name New Holland on his map only for the western part of the continent. Due to the delay caused by his lengthy confinement, the first published map of the Australian continent was the Freycinet Map of 1811, a product of the Baudin expedition, issued in 1811.

Flinders finally returned to England in October 1810. He was in poor health but immediately resumed work preparing A Voyage to Terra Australis and his atlas of maps for publication. The full title of this book, which was first published in London in July 1814, was given, as was common at the time, a synoptic description: A Voyage to Terra Australis: undertaken for the purpose of completing the discovery of that vast country, and prosecuted in the years 1801, 1802, and 1803 in His Majesty's ship the Investigator, and subsequently in the armed vessel Porpoise and Cumberland Schooner. With an account of the shipwreck of the Porpoise, arrival of the Cumberland at Mauritius, and imprisonment of the commander during six years and a half in that island. Original copies of the Atlas to Flinders' Voyage to Terra Australis are held at the Mitchell Library in Sydney as a portfolio that accompanied the book and included engravings of 16 maps, four plates of views and ten plates of Australian flora. The book was republished in three volumes in 1964, accompanied by a reproduction of the portfolio. Flinders' map of Terra Australis or Australia (so the two parts of the double name of his 1804 manuscript reversed) was first published in January 1814 (Note: All maps published by the British H/Office are dated.) and the remaining maps were published before his atlas and book.

== Death and reburial ==
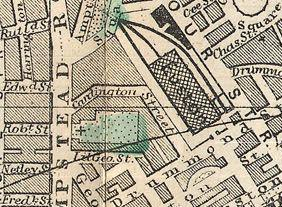
St James's Gardens, tinted green and shown west of Euston railway station, on an 1890 Bacon Traveler's Pocket Map of London by George Washington Bacon

Flinders died, aged 40, on 19 July 1814 from kidney disease, at his London home at 14 London Street, later renamed Maple Street and now the site of the BT Tower. This was on the day after the book and atlas was published; Flinders never saw the completed work (as he was unconscious by that time), but his wife arranged the volumes on his bed covers so that he could touch them. On 23 July, he was interred in the burial ground of St James's Church, Piccadilly, which was located some distance from the church, beside Hampstead Road, Camden, London. The burial ground was in use from 1790 until 1853. By 1852, the location of the grave had been forgotten due to alterations to the burial ground.

In 1878, the cemetery became St James's Gardens, Camden, with only a few gravestones lining the edges of the park. Part of the gardens, located between Hampstead Road and Euston railway station, was built over when Euston station was expanded, and Flinders' grave was thought to possibly lie under a station platform. The Gardens were closed to the public in 2017 for work on the High Speed 2 (HS2) rail project which requires the expansion of Euston station.

The grave was located in January 2019 by archaeologists. His coffin was identified by its well-preserved lead coffin plate. Film of the discovery and the exhumation was shown in a documentary on British television in September 2020. It was proposed to re-bury his remains, at a site to be decided, after they had been examined by osteo-archaeologists.

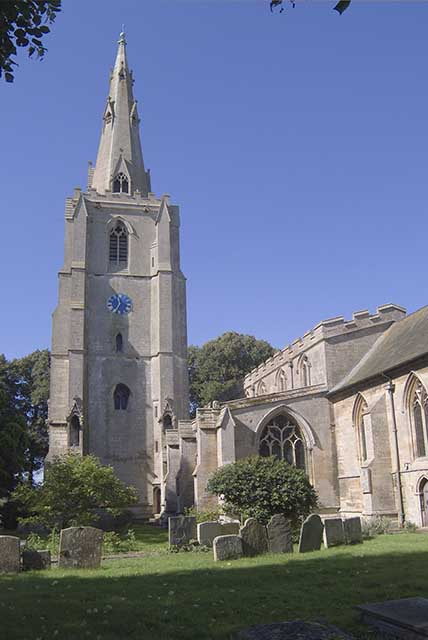
Church of St Mary and the Holy Rood, Donington, Lincolnshire, where Flinders was baptised, and was reburied in 2024

Following the discovery of his grave, the parish church of Donington, Lincolnshire, Flinders' birthplace, saw a surge of visitors. The Matthew Flinders Bring Him Home Group and the Britain–Australia Society, as well as Flinders' direct descendants, campaigned to have his remains interred at the Church of St Mary and the Holy Rood in Donington. On 17 October 2019 HS2 Ltd announced that Flinders' remains could be reinterred in the church in Donington, where he was baptised. Permission was given by the Diocese of Lincoln for reburial in the north aisle. His remains were reburied there on 13 July 2024. The coffin used for his reburial is a replica of the one he was originally buried in. Based on historical and archaeological evidence, it was made by one of the archaeologists who excavated his grave in 2019. The church displayed a recently discovered portrait, apparently of Flinders in his last years, attributed to Investigator artist William Westall.

== Family ==
On 17 April 1801, Flinders married his longstanding friend Ann Chappelle (1772–1852) and had hoped to take her with him to Port Jackson. However, the Admiralty had strict rules against wives accompanying captains. Flinders brought Ann on board ship and planned to ignore the rules, but the Admiralty learned of his plans and reprimanded him for his bad judgement, and ordered him to remove her from the ship. This is well documented in correspondence between Flinders and his chief benefactor, Sir Joseph Banks, in May 1801:

I have but time to tell you that the news of your marriage, which was published in the Lincoln paper, has reached me. The Lords of the Admiralty have heard also that Mrs. Flinders is on board the Investigator, and that you have some thought of carrying her to sea with you. This I was very sorry to hear, and if that is the case I beg to give you my advice by no means to adventure to measures so contrary to the regulations and the discipline of the Navy; for I am convinced by language I have heard, that their Lordships will, if they hear of her being in New South Wales, immediately order you to be superseded, whatever may be the consequences, and in all likelihood order Mr. Grant to finish the survey.

As a result, Ann was obliged to stay in England and would not see her husband for nine years, following his imprisonment on the Isle de France (Mauritius, at the time a French possession) on his return journey. When they finally reunited, Matthew and Ann had one daughter, Anne (1 April 1812 – 1892), who later married William Petrie (1821–1908). In 1853, the governments of New South Wales and Victoria bequeathed a belated pension to her (deceased) mother of £100, equivalent to A$15,414 in 2022, per year, to go to surviving issue of the union. This she accepted on behalf of her young son, William Matthew Flinders Petrie, who would go on to become an accomplished archaeologist and Egyptologist.

== Naming of Australia and discovery of Flinders' 1804 map Y46/1 ==
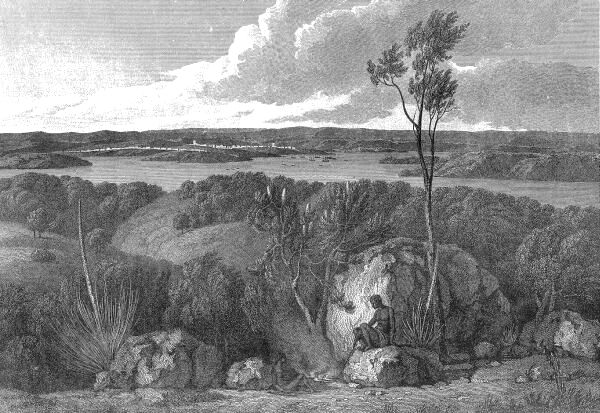
View of Port Jackson taken from the South by William Westall; engraving from Flinders' A Voyage to Terra Australis, published in 1814

Flinders' map Y46/1 was never "lost". It had been stored and recorded by the UK Hydrographic Office before 1828. Geoffrey C. Ingleton mentioned Y46/1 in his book Matthew Flinders Navigator and Chartmaker on page 438. By 1987 every library in Australia had access to a microfiche copy of Flinders Y46/1. In 2001–2002 the Mitchell Library Sydney displayed Y46/1 at their "Matthew Flinders – The Ultimate Voyage" exhibition. Paul Brunton called Y46/1 "the memorial of the great naval explorer Matthew Flinders". The first hard-copy of Y46/1 and its cartouche was retrieved from the UK Hydrographic Office (Taunton, Somerset) by historian Bill Fairbanks in 2004. On 2 April 2004, copies of the chart were presented by three of Matthew Flinders's descendants to the Governor of New South Wales, in London, to be presented in turn to the people of Australia through their parliaments by 14 November, the 200th anniversary of the chart leaving Mauritius. This celebration marked the first time the naming of Australia was formally recognised.

However, Flinders was not the first to use the word Australia, nor was he the first to apply the name specifically to the continent. He owned a copy of Alexander Dalrymple's 1771 book An Historical Collection of Voyages and Discoveries in the South Pacific Ocean, and it seems likely he borrowed it from there, but he applied it specifically to the continent, not the whole South Pacific region. In 1804 he wrote to his brother: "I call the whole island Australia, or Terra Australis". Later that year, he wrote to Sir Joseph Banks and mentioned "my general chart of Australia", a map that Flinders had constructed from all the information he had accumulated while he was in Australian waters and finished while he was detained by the French in Mauritius. Flinders explained in his letter to Banks:

The propriety of the name Australia or Terra Australis, which I have applied to the whole body of what has generally been called New Holland, must be submitted to the approbation of the Admiralty and the learned in geography. It seems to me an inconsistent thing that captain Cooks New South Wales should be absorbed in the New Holland of the Dutch, and therefore I have reverted to the original name Terra Australis or the Great South Land, by which it was distinguished even by the Dutch during the 17th century; for it appears that it was not until some time after Tasman's second voyage that the name New Holland was first applied, and then it was long before it displaced T’Zuydt Landt in the charts, and could not extend to what was not yet known to have existence; New South Wales, therefore, ought to remain distinct from New Holland; but as it is requisite that the whole body should have one general name, since it is now known (if there is no great error in the Dutch part) that it is certainly all one land, so I judge, that one less exceptionable to all parties and on all accounts cannot be found than that now applied.

Flinders continued to promote the use of the word until his arrival in London in 1810. Here he found that Banks did not approve of the name and had not unpacked the chart he had sent him, and that New Holland and Terra Australis were still in general use. As a result, a book by Flinders was published under the title A Voyage to Terra Australis and his published map of 1814 also shows Terra Australis as the first of the two name options, despite his objections. The final proofs were brought to him on his deathbed, but he was unconscious. The book was published on 18 July 1814, but Flinders did not regain consciousness and died the next day, never knowing that his name for the continent would be accepted.

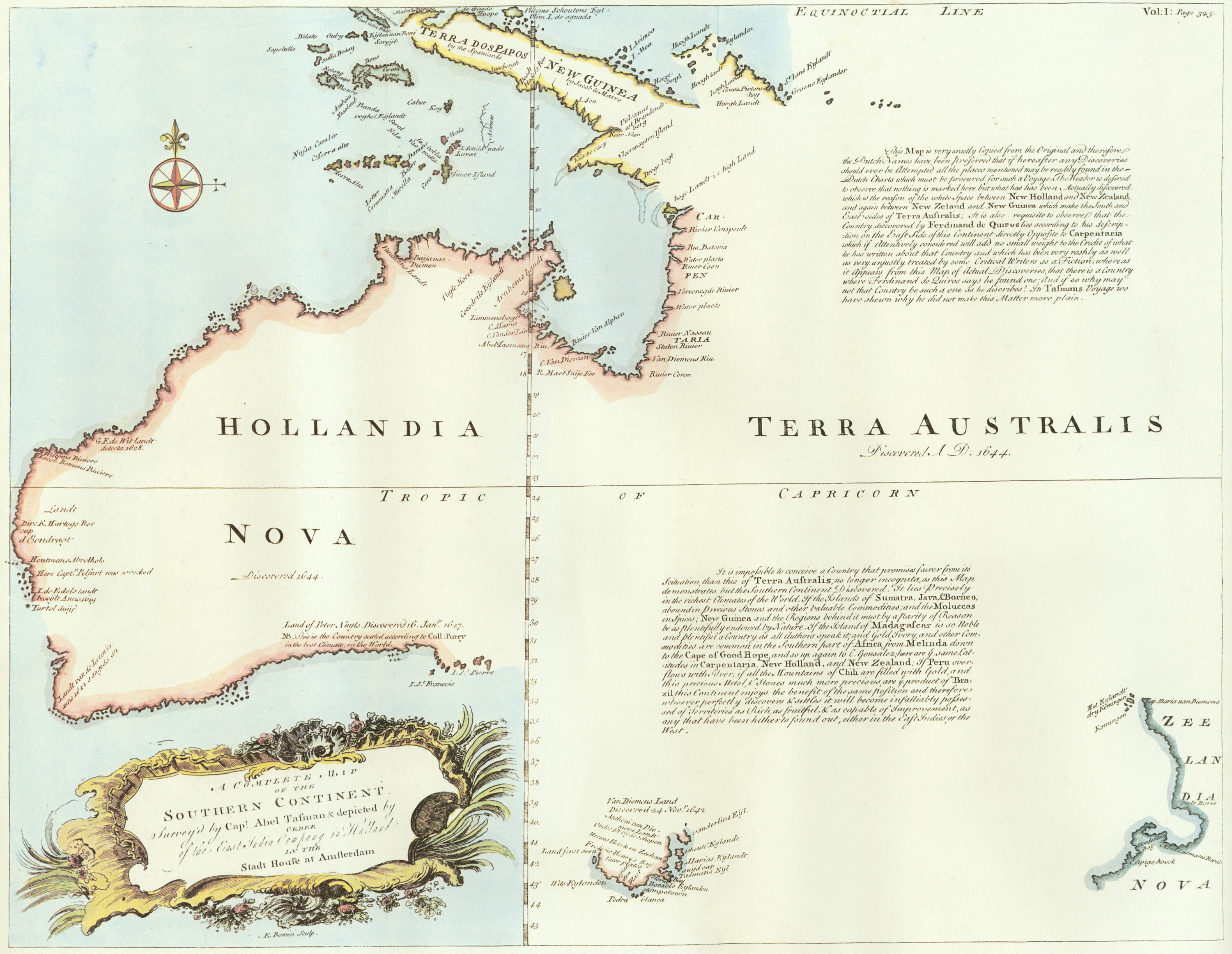
1744 Chart of Hollandia Nova – Terra Australis by Emanuel Bowen

Banks wrote a draft of an introduction to Flinders' Voyage, referring to the map published by Melchisédech Thévenot in Relations des Divers Voyages (1663), and made well known to English readers by Emanuel Bowen's adaptation of it, A Complete Map of the Southern Continent, published in John Campbell's editions of John Harris's Navigantium atque Itinerantium Bibliotheca, or Voyages and Travels (1744–48, and 1764). Banks said in the draft:

It was not until after Tasman's second voyage, in 1644, that the general name Terra Australis, or Great South Land, was made to give place to the new term of New Holland; and it was then applied only to the parts lying westward of a meridian line, passing through Arnhem's Land on the north, and near the Isles St Peter and St Francis on the south: All to the eastward, including the shores of the Gulph of Carpentaria, still remained Terra Australis. This appears from a chart by Thevenot in 1663, which he says "was originally taken from that done in inlaid work upon the pavement of the new Stadt House at Amsterdam". It is necessary, however, to geographical precision that the whole of this great body of land should be distinguished by one general term, and under the circumstances of the discovery of the different parts, the original Terra Australis has been judged the most proper. Of this term, therefore, we shall hereafter make use when speaking of New Holland and New South Wales in a collective sense; and when using it in an extensive signification, the adjacent isles, including that of Van Diemen, must be understood to be comprehended.

Although Thévenot said that he had taken his chart from the one inlaid into the floor of the Amsterdam Town Hall, in fact it appears to be an almost exact copy of that of Joan Blaeu in his Archipelagus Orientalis sive Asiaticus published in 1659. It seems to have been Thévenot who introduced a differentiation between Nova Hollandia to the west and Terre Australe to the east of the meridian corresponding to 135° East of Greenwich, emphasised by the latitude staff running down that meridian, as there is no such division on Blaeu's map.

In his Voyage, Flinders wrote:

There is no probability, that any other detached body of land, of nearly equal extent, will ever be found in a more southern latitude; (Note: This claim was proven wrong by the discovery of Antarctica in 1820.) the name Terra Australis will, therefore, remain descriptive of the geographical importance of this country, and of its situation on the globe: it has antiquity to recommend it; and, having no reference to either of the two claiming nations, appears to be less objectionable than any other which could have been selected.

...with the accompanying note at the bottom of the page:

Had I permitted myself any innovation upon the original term, it would have been to convert it into Australia; as being more agreeable to the ear, and an assimilation to the names of the other great portions of the earth.

Flinders' book was widely read and gave the term Australia general currency. Lachlan Macquarie, Governor of New South Wales, became aware of Flinders' preference for the name Australia and used it in his dispatches to England. On 12 December 1817, he recommended to the Colonial Office that it be officially adopted. In 1824 the British Admiralty agreed that the continent should be known officially as Australia.

== Legacy of Flinders ==
=== Statues and memorials ===
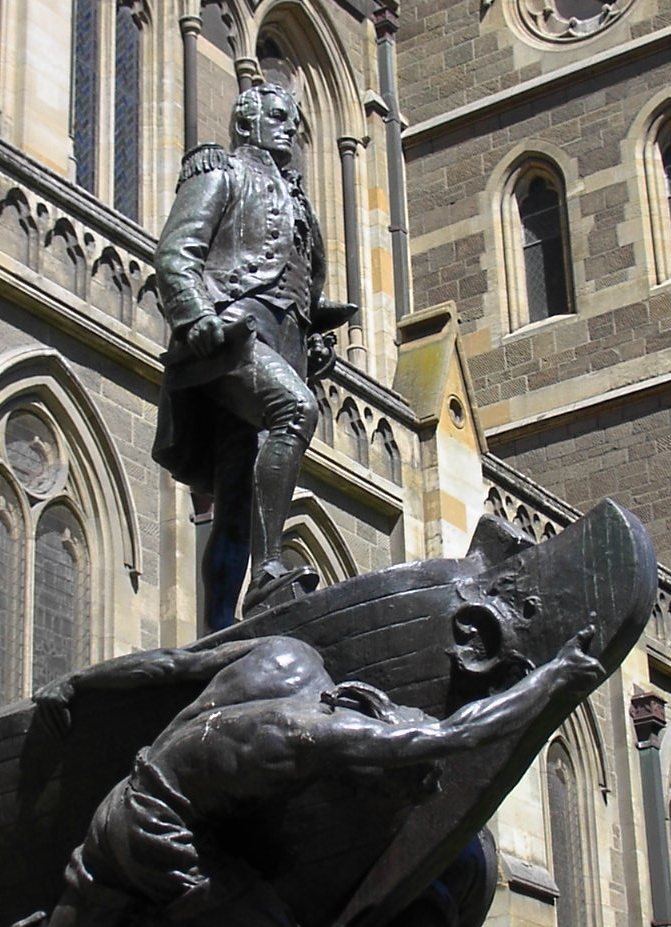
Statue of Flinders outside St Paul's Cathedral, Melbourne

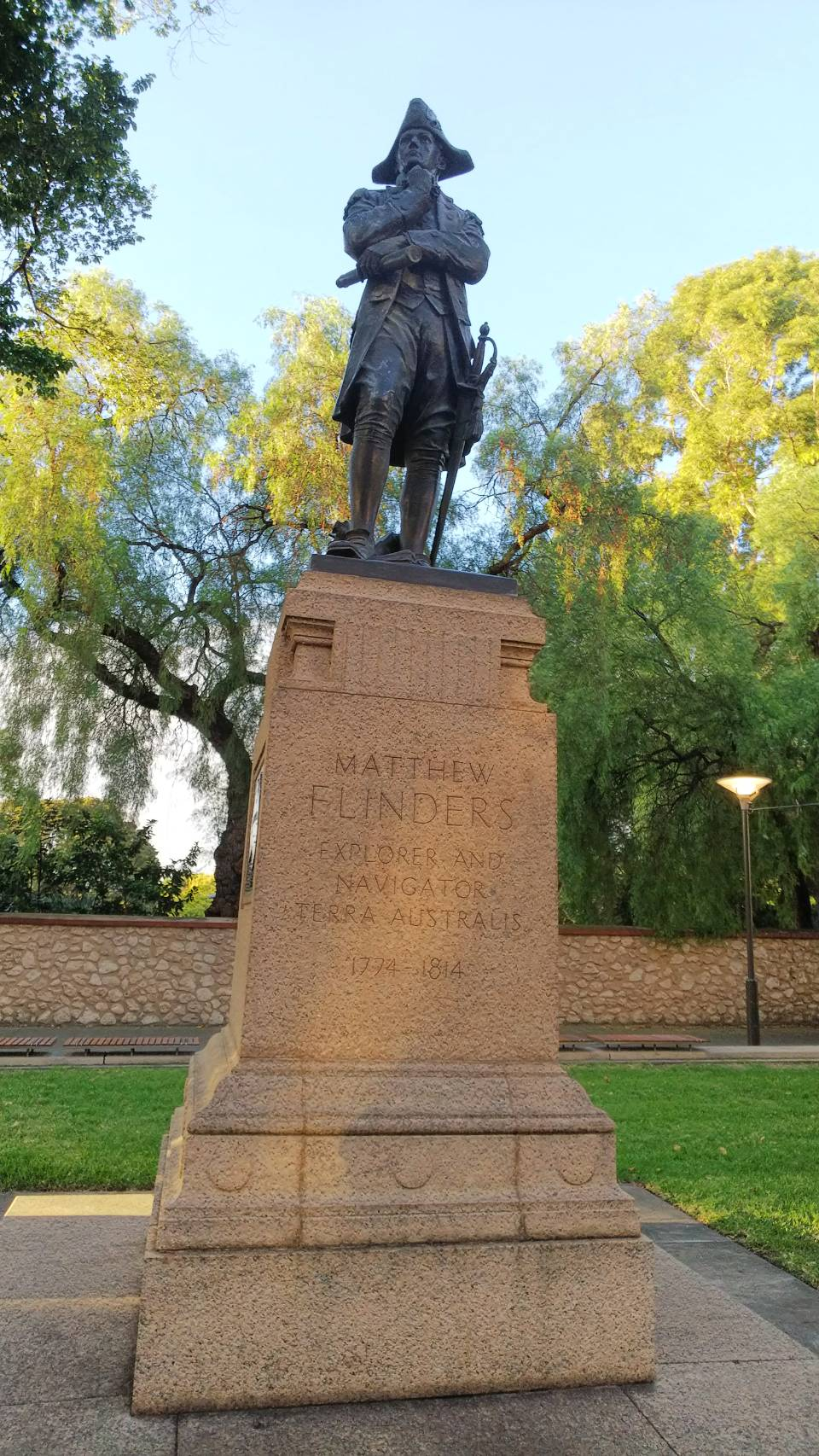
Statue on North Terrace, Adelaide

In Australia, statues of Flinders include those:

- on Macquarie Street, Sydney;
- outside St Paul's Cathedral, Melbourne;
- in the seaside town of Mornington, Victoria (which also has a monument to Flinders);
- at Flinders University
- on North Terrace, Adelaide; and
- on Tasman Terrace, Port Lincoln.

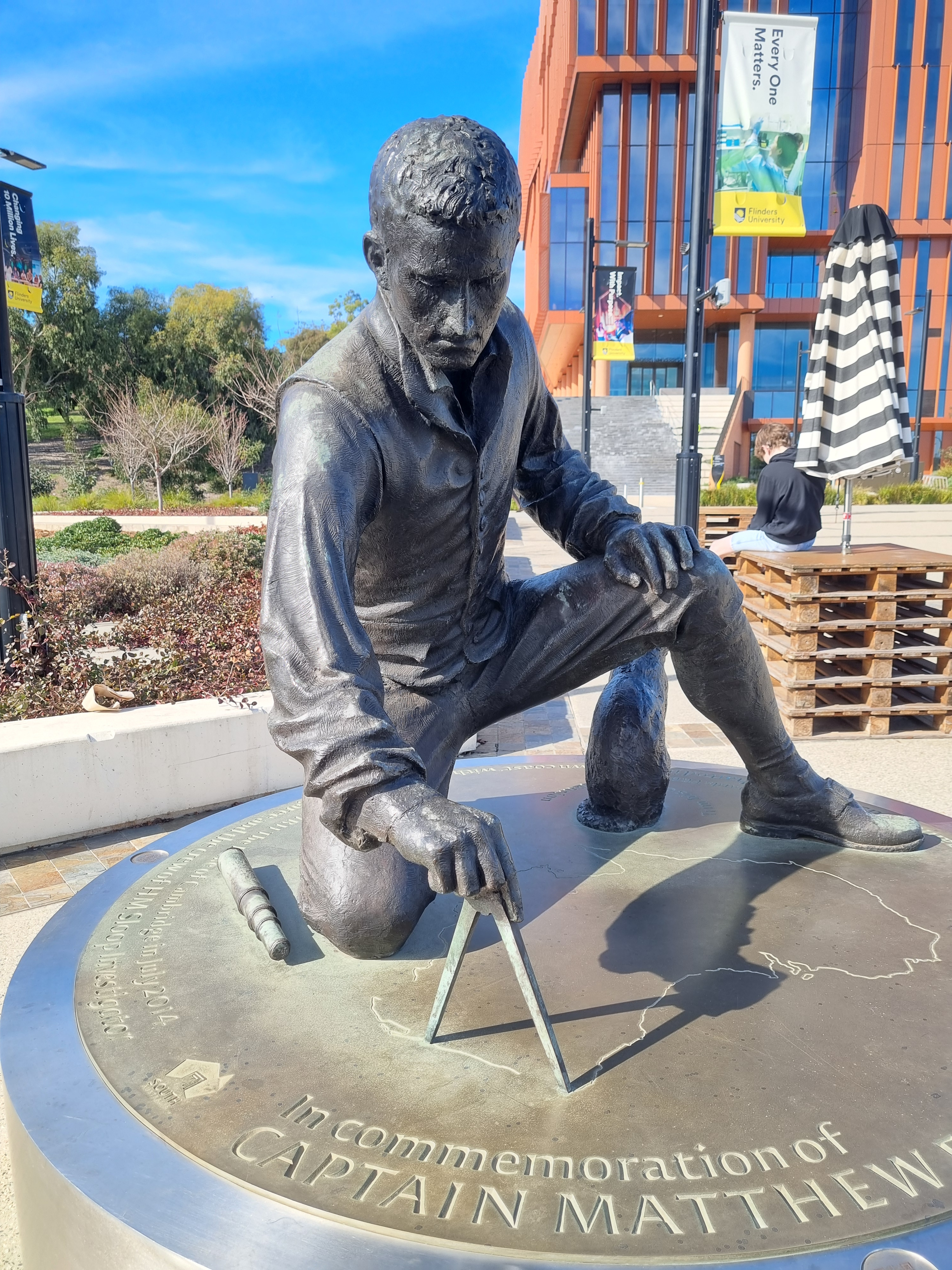
Statue at Flinders University

In his native England, the first statue of Flinders was erected on 16 March 2006 (his birthday) in his hometown of Donington. The statue also depicts the cat Trim who accompanied him on his voyages. In July 2014, on the 200-year anniversary of his death, a large bronze statue of Flinders by the sculptor Mark Richards was unveiled at Australia House, London by Prince William, Duke of Cambridge, and later installed at Euston station near the then-presumed location of his grave. In 2021 full size bronze replica of the statue was installed at Flinders Station, Flinders University, South Australia.

Flinders' explorations of the Hervey Bay area are commemorated by a monument called Matthew Flinders Lookout at the top of an escarpment facing the bay in Dayman Park, Urangan (25.2893°S 152.9080°E).

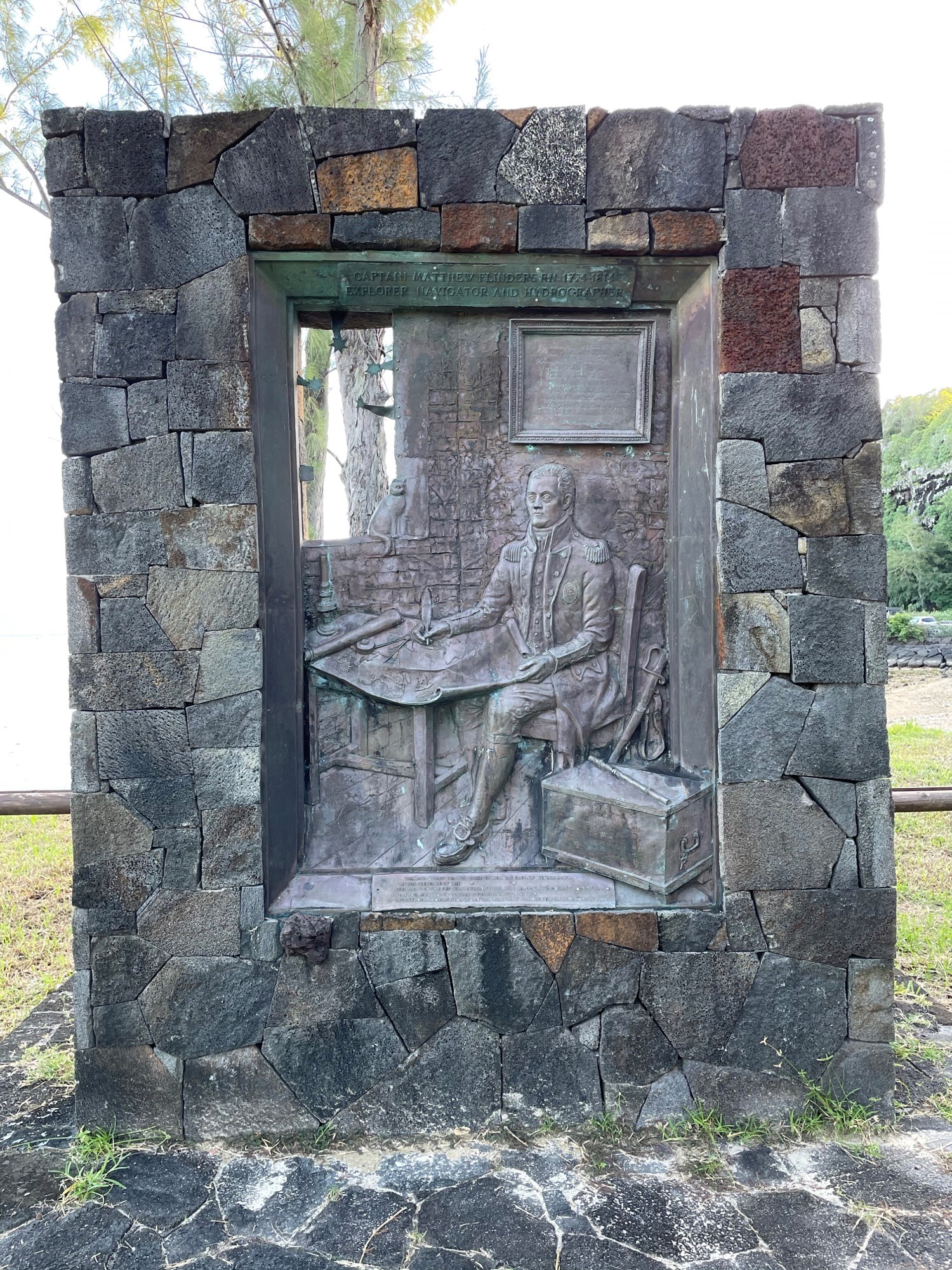
Matthew Flinders Memorial Statue, Mauritius

The Captain Flinders Memorial is a stone memorial located close to Macondé, Mauritius, on the ocean's edge. The memorial is located close to where he landed on 17 December 1803. The memorial has a brass plaque with the title "Captain Matthew Flinders RN 1774 - 1814, Explorer, Navigator and Hydrographer". The details show Flinders, sitting at his desk with a map showing the Indian Ocean and Australia. At the bottom of the monument, the plaque reads "This monument was unveiled by HRH The Earl of Wessex KCVO in the presence of the president of the republic of Mauritius, Sir Anerood Jugnauth PC, KCMG, QC on November 6th 2003 to commemorate the bicentenary of the arrival in Mauritius of Captain Matthew Flinders on 15 December 1803".

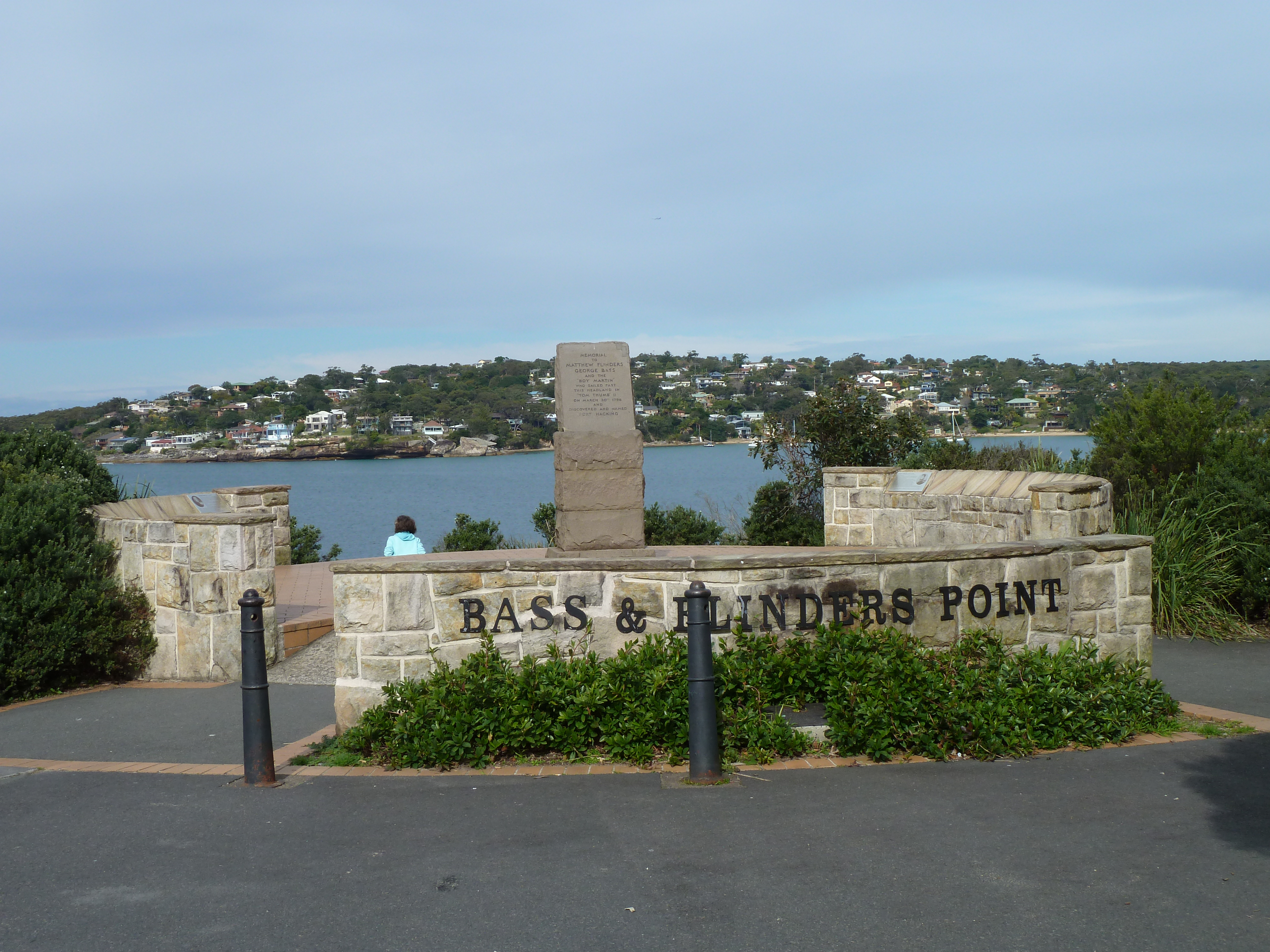
Bass and Flinders Point in Cronulla, New South Wales

Bass and Flinders Point in the southernmost part of Cronulla in New South Wales features a monument to George Bass and Matthew Flinders, who explored the Port Hacking estuary.

=== Places ===
Although he never used his own name for any feature in all his discoveries, Flinders' name is now associated with over 100 geographical features and places in Australia, including Flinders Island in Bass Strait, but not Flinders Island in South Australia, which he named for his younger brother, Samuel Flinders.

Flinders is seen as being particularly important in South Australia, where he is considered the main explorer of the state. Landmarks named after him in South Australia include the Flinders Ranges and Flinders Ranges National Park; Flinders Column at Mount Lofty; Flinders Chase National Park on Kangaroo Island; Flinders Parade in Victor Harbor; Flinders University; Flinders Medical Centre; the suburb Flinders Park; and Flinders Street in Adelaide.

In Victoria, eponymous places include Flinders Peak; Flinders Street in Melbourne (site of Flinders Street railway station); the suburb of Flinders; the federal electorate of Flinders; and the Matthew Flinders Girls Secondary College in Geelong.

Flinders Bay in Western Australia and Flinders Way in Canberra also commemorate him.

Educational institutions named after him include Flinders Park Primary School in South Australia, and Matthew Flinders Anglican College on the Sunshine Coast in Queensland. A former electoral district of the Queensland Parliament was named Flinders. There are also Flinders Highways in both Queensland and South Australia.

=== In the arts ===
His life was dramatised in the radio plays They Sailed on Friday, The Mapmaker, and My Love Must Wait (the latter adapted by Catherine Shepherd from the novel by Ernestine Hill).

The portrait of Matthew Flinders painted by good friend Antoine Toussaint de Chazal on Isle de France in 1807 is on display at the Art Gallery of South Australia.

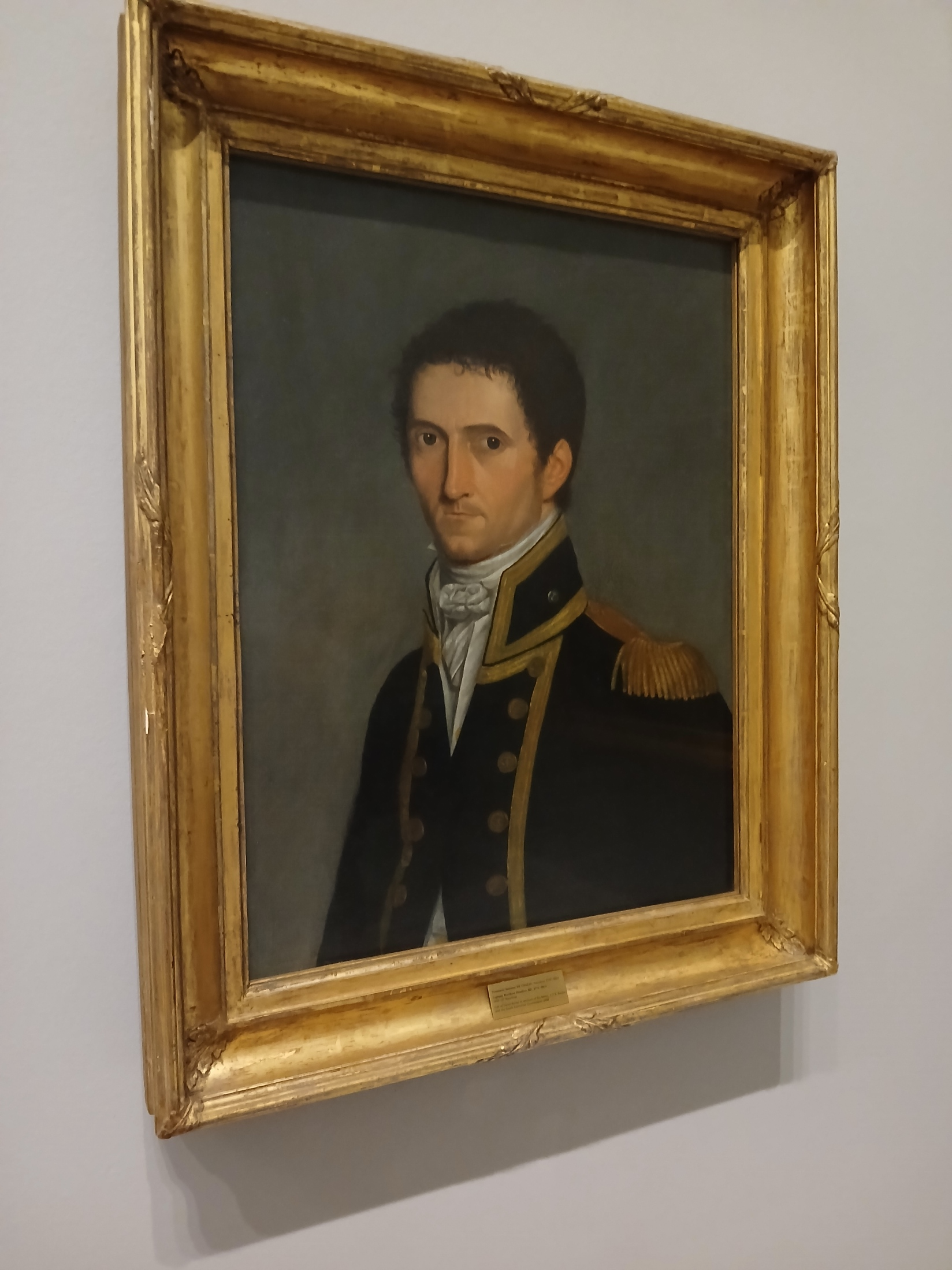
A painted portrait of Matthew Flinders painted by Toussaint de Chazal on display at the Art Gallery of South Australia

=== Other recognition ===
Flindersia is a genus of fourteen species of tree in the citrus family; it was named by Investigator's botanist, Robert Brown in honour of Flinders. The eastern school whiting, Sillago flindersi is named after him.

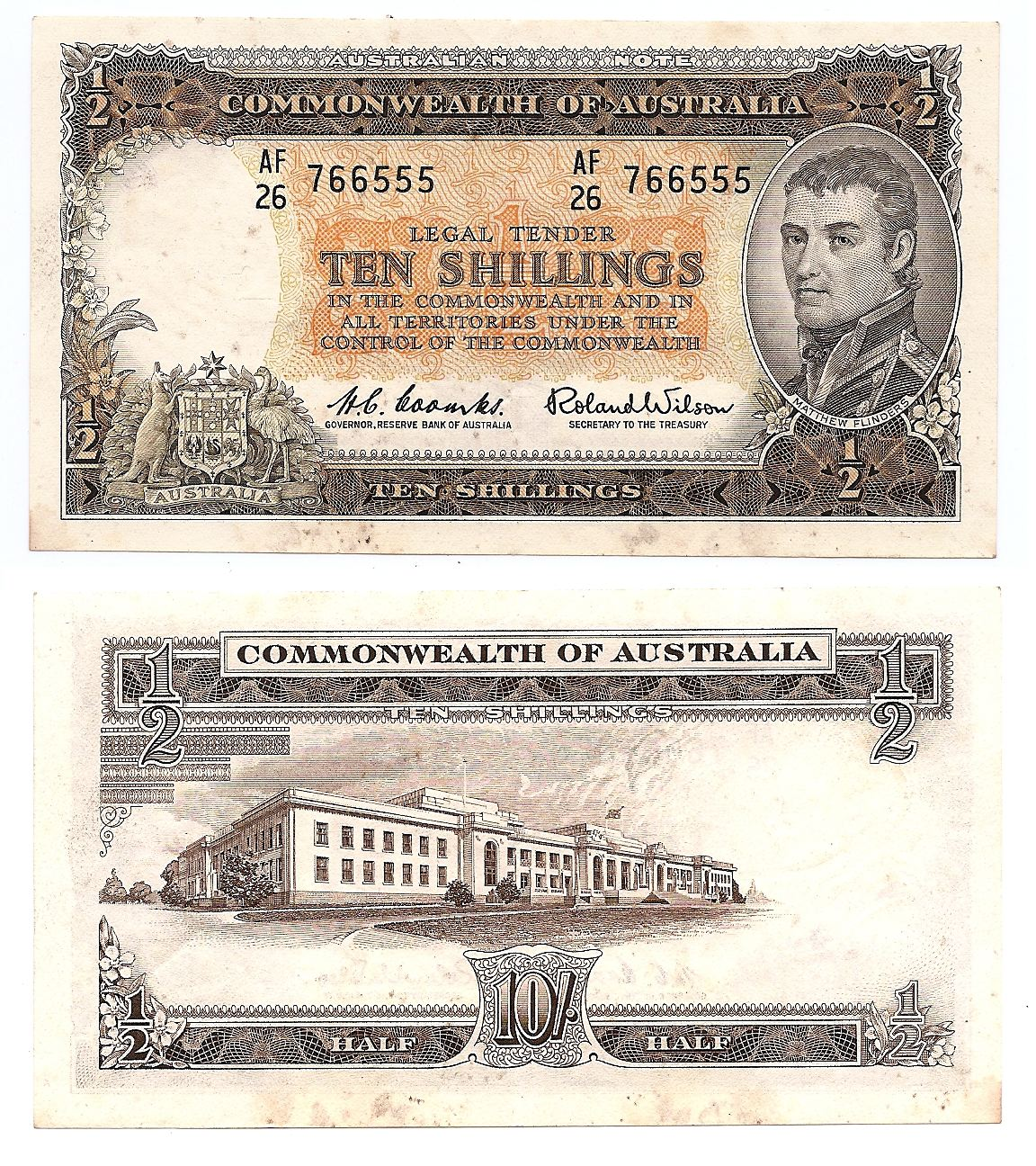
Australia 10 Shillings 1961–1965 ND banknote. Obverse: Bust of Flinders. Reverse: Parliament House in Canberra

A bust of Flinders was depicted on the obverse side of the Australia 10 Shillings 1961–1965 ND Banknote.

In 1964 he was honoured on a postage stamp issued by Postmaster-General's Department, again in 1980, and in 1998 with George Bass.

On 30 June 2019 the Royal Australian Navy ordered the construction of HMAS Flinders a Hunter-class frigate to be built by BAE Systems Australia in Osborne.

Flinders landed on Coochiemudlo Island on 19 July 1799, while he was searching for a river in the southern part of Moreton Bay, Queensland, Australia. The island's residents celebrate Flinders Day annually, commemorating the landing. The celebrations are usually held on a weekend near 19 July, the actual date of the landing.

To commemorate his legacy, Euston's newest pub, just a matter of yards from where his remains were found, has been named The Captain Flinders.

=== Language and people ===
Flinders' proposal for the use of iron bars to be used to compensate for the magnetic deviations caused by iron on board a ship resulted in their being known as Flinders bars.

Flinders coined the term dodge tide in reference to his observations that the tides in the very shallow Spencer and St Vincent's Gulfs seemed to be completely inert for several days, at select locations. Such phenomena have now also been found in the Gulf of Mexico and in the Irish Sea.

Flinders, who was Sir John Franklin's cousin by marriage, John's mother Hannah being the sister of Matthew's stepmother Elizabeth, instilled in him a love for navigating and took him with him on his voyage aboard Investigator.

== Works ==
- A Voyage to Terra Australis, with an accompanying Atlas. 2 vol. – London : G & W Nicol, 18 July 1814
- Australia Circumnavigated: The Journal of HMS Investigator, 1801–1803. Edited by Kenneth Morgan, 2 vols, The Hakluyt Society, London, 2015.
- Trim: Being the True Story of a Brave Seafaring Cat.
- Private Journal 1803–1814. Edited with an introduction by Anthony J. Brown and Gillian Dooley. Friends of the State Library of South Australia, 2005.
- Flinders, Matthew (1806). "Observations upon the Marine Barometer, Made during the Examination of the Coasts of New Holland and New South Wales, in the Years 1801, 1802, and 1803". Philosophical Transactions of the Royal Society. 96: 239–266. doi:10.1098/rstl.1806.0012. S2CID 110451310.
- Flinders, Matthew (1805). "Concerning the Differences in the Magnetic Needle, on Board the Investigator, Arising from an Alteration in the Direction of the Ship's Head". Philosophical Transactions of the Royal Society. 95: 186–197. doi:10.1098/rstl.1805.0012.

== See also ==
- European and American voyages of scientific exploration
- Flinders bar
- List of explorers
- Matthew Flinders Medal and Lecture
- Matthew Flinders' Cat, a novel by Bryce Courtenay (2002)
- Trim (cat)

== Sources ==
- Flinders, Matthew (1966) [1814]. A Voyage to Terra Australis: Undertaken for the Purpose of Completing the Discovery of that Vast Country, and Prosecuted in the Years 1801, 1802, and 1803, in His Majesty's Ship the Investigator. Adelaide: Libraries Board of South Australia. LCCN 66070225. OCLC 4565366. OL 38607138M. Wikidata Q133875246.
- McCarthy, F. D. (11 July 2025) [1966]. "Bungaree (c. 1775–1830)". Australian Dictionary of Biography. Vol. 1. National Centre of Biography, Australian National University. ISBN 978-0-522-84459-7. ISSN 1833-7538. OCLC 70677943.
- Scott, Ernest (1914). The Life of Captain Matthew Flinders, RN . Sydney: Angus & Robertson – via Wikisource.
