= Moorooboora =

Eora leader

Moorooboora (c.1758 – January 1798), also known as Moroobra or Maroubra, was a leader of the Murro-ore-dial clan of the Eora people who resided in what is now the Eastern Suburbs of Sydney. He was the father of Cora Gooseberry and the father-in-law of the prominent Indigenous Australian sailor Bungaree.

== Moorooboora and Colebe ==
In December 1797, tribal fighting resulted in Colebe, a friend of Bennelong, killing a man named Yeranibe in a cowardly manner. Yeranibe's friends, including Gnunga Gnunga Murremurgan and Moorooboora seized their weapons, determined to take revenge on Colebe and members of his family. Colebe and one of his relations were beaten very severely, but were not killed.

Colebe later faced a traditional trial of justice by having spears thrown at him, but was saved from death by some British soldiers. Unhappy with this interference of ritual law, Moorooboora and several associates later made a further attack on Colebe in January 1798. After several blows on the head, it was supposed that Colebe was dead, but upon seeing him attempting to get up, Moorooboora returned to land the final blow. However, one of Colebe's friends speared Moorooboora before he could hit Colebe. The spear entered Moorooboora over the hip bone, going through his body, penetrating the bladder in its passage. Moorooboora died of this wound about an hour later.

== Legacy ==
Moorooboora's name is derived from muru (meaning pathway) and boora (meaning initiation ground). In particular, it refers to the pathway that went to the initiation ground that was at Boora Point in south-eastern Sydney and is how the present suburb of Maroubra gets its name.

== See also ==
- List of Indigenous Australian historical figures
