= Trim (cat) =

Cat belonging to explorer Matthew Flinders

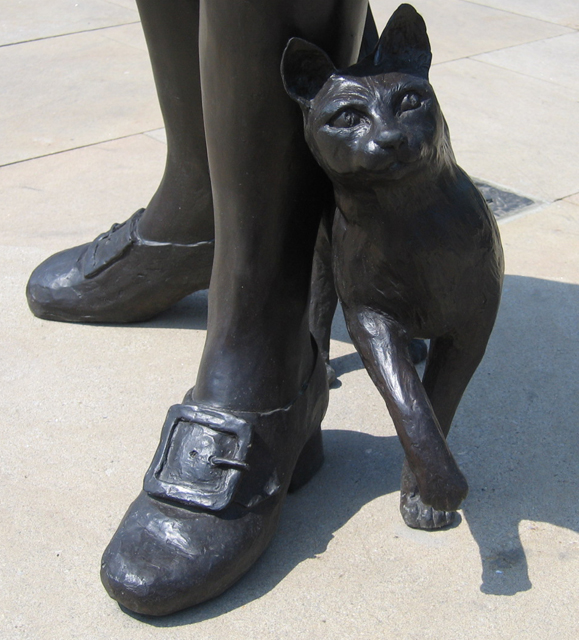
- Statue of Trim with Matthew Flinders, in Donington, Lincolnshire, Flinders' birthplace
- Species: Felis catus
- Breed: Mixed
- Sex: Male
- Born: 1799; At sea
- Died: 1804 (aged 4–5); Mauritius
- Nationality: England
- Occupation: Ship's cat, companion
- Employer: Matthew Flinders
- Known for: Accompanying Flinders on trips between England and Australia, circumnavigation of Australia
- Appearance: Bicolour (black with white paws, chin, and a white star on chest)
- Named after: Character from Tristram Shandy

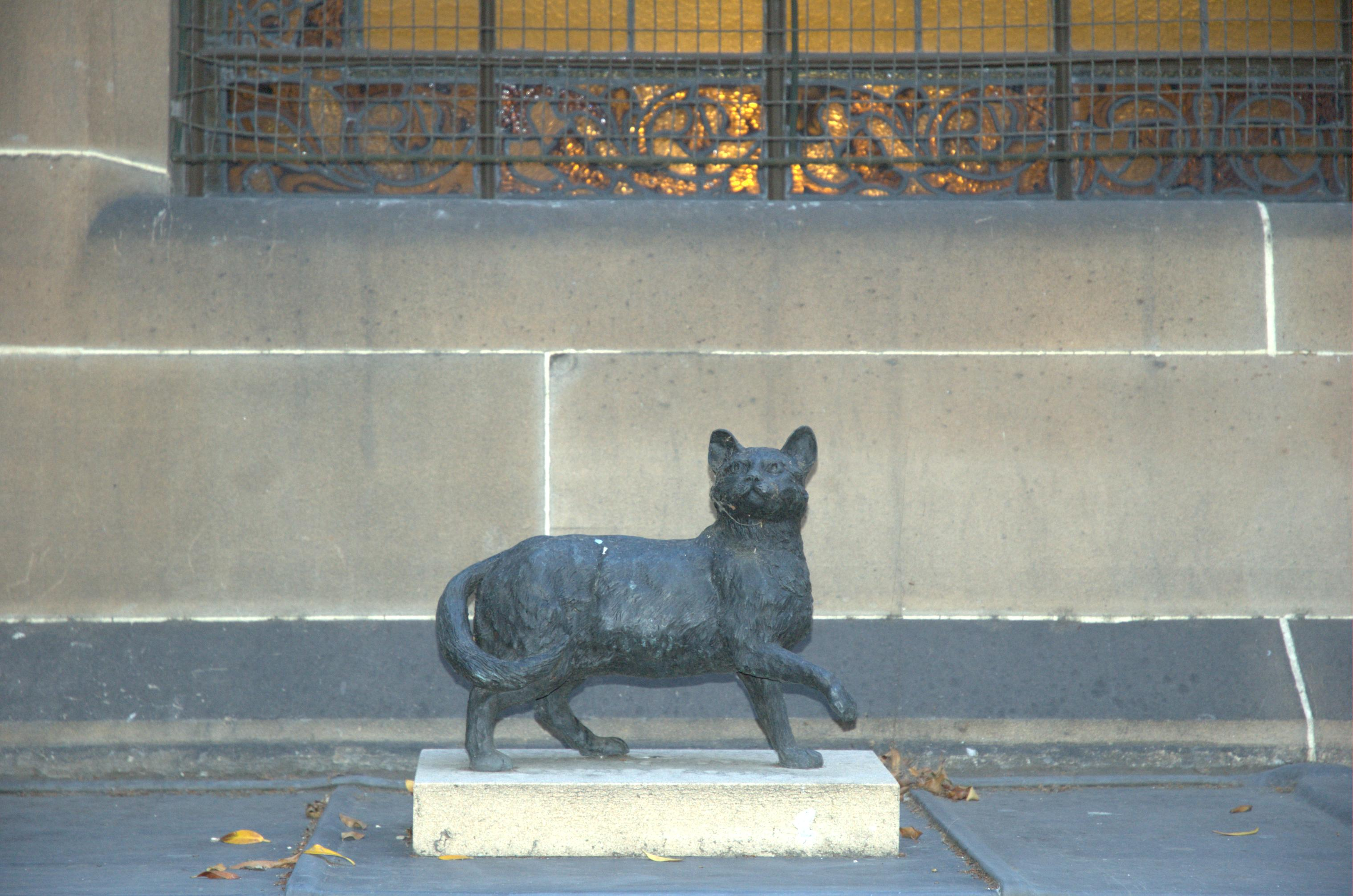
Trim's statue by John Cornwell behind Matthew Flinders's own in Sydney, Australia

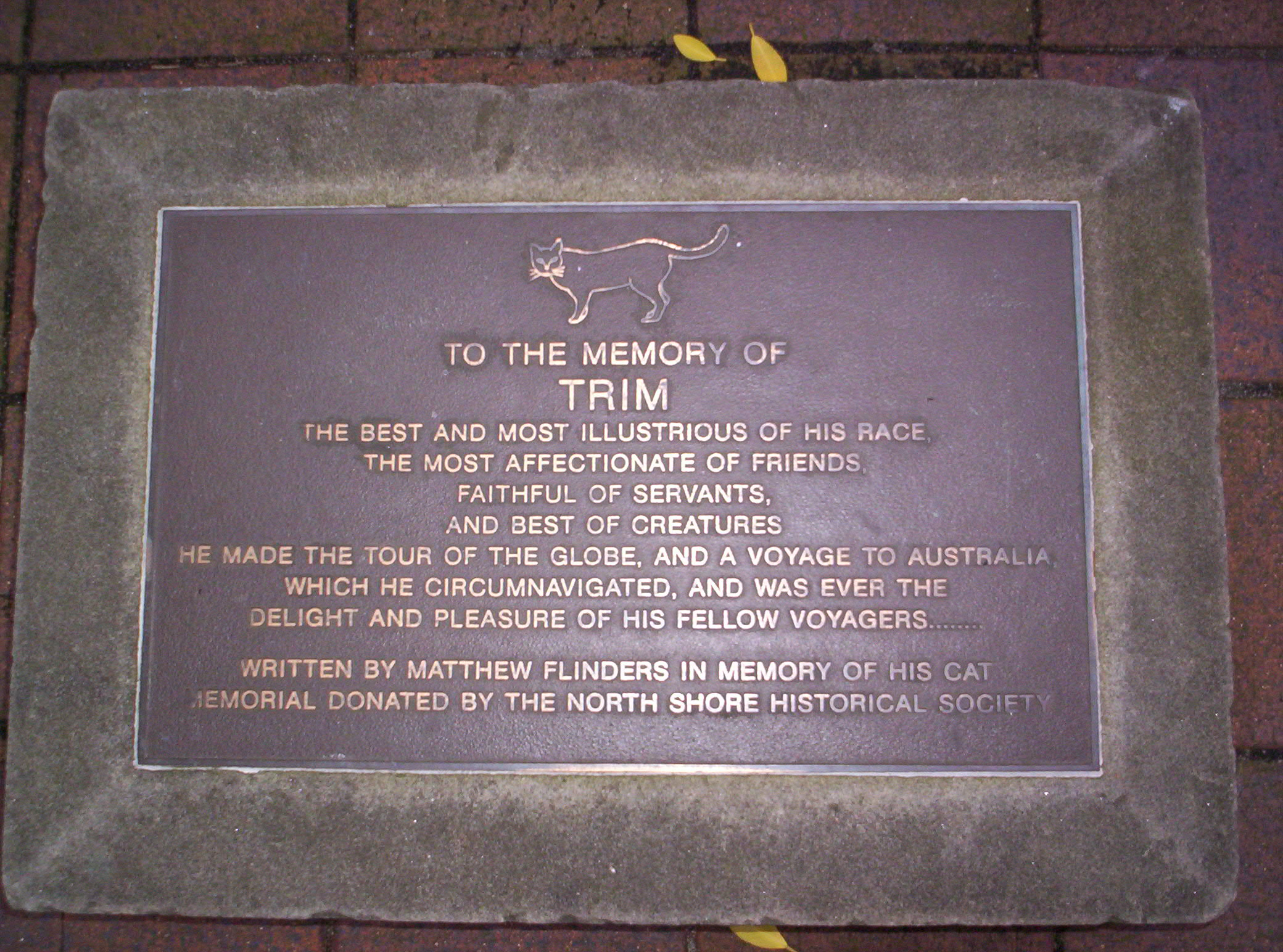
Plaque dedicated to Trim at Mitchell Library, Sydney

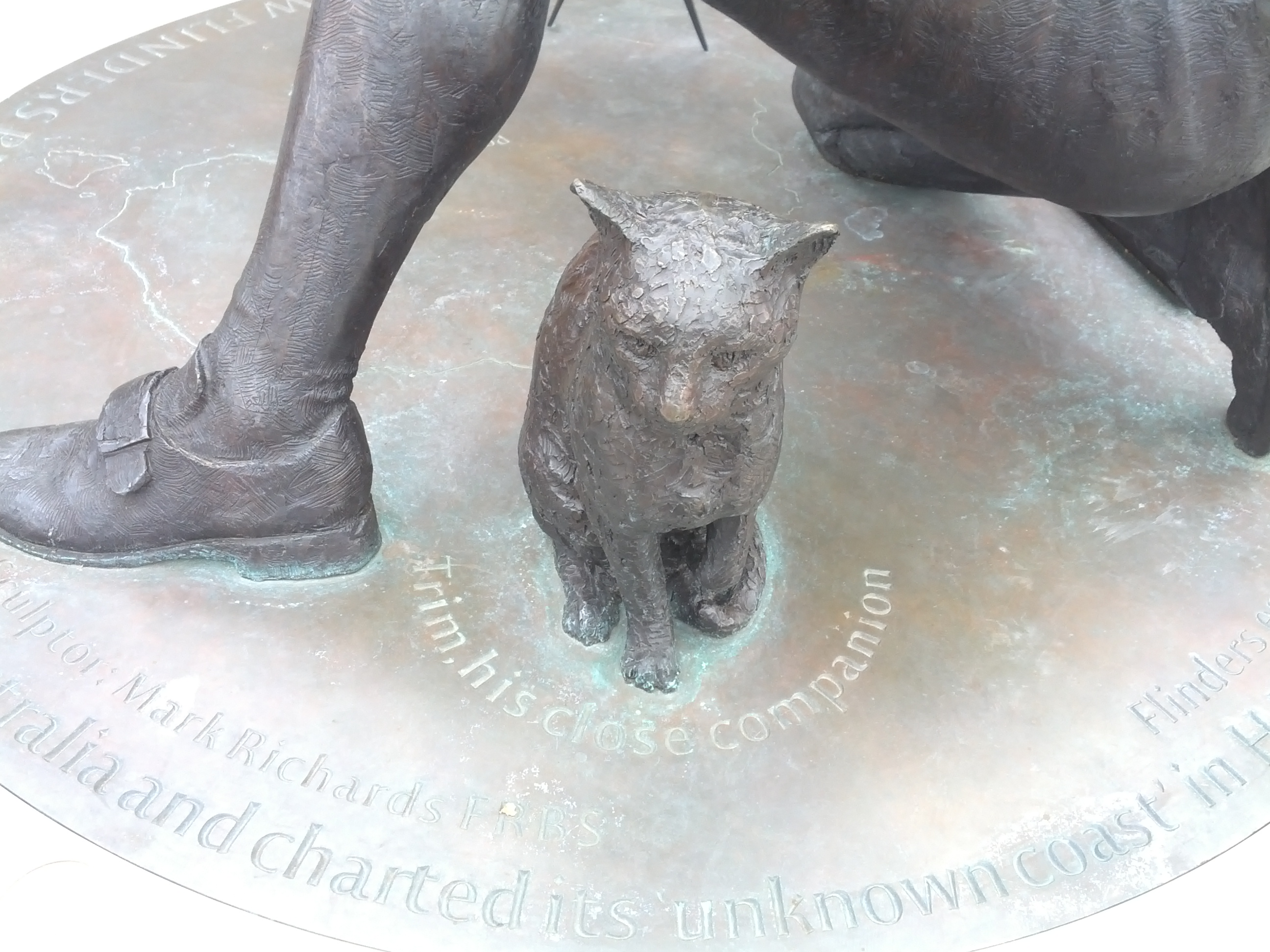
Trim. Flinders' faithful boat cat. Port Lincoln, South Australia

Trim (1799–1804) was a ship's cat which accompanied Matthew Flinders on his voyages to circumnavigate and map the coastline of Australia from 1801 to 1803.

== Biography ==
Trim was born in 1799 aboard the ship HMS Reliance, on a voyage from the Cape of Good Hope to Botany Bay. The kitten fell overboard, but managed to swim back to the vessel and climb aboard by scaling a rope; taking note of his strong survival instinct and intelligence, Flinders and the crew made him their favourite.

Trim sailed with Flinders on HMS Investigator on his voyage of circumnavigation around the Australian mainland and survived the shipwreck of HMS Porpoise on Wreck Reef in 1803. When Flinders was accused of spying and imprisoned by the French in Mauritius on his return voyage to England, Trim kept him company but also took daily excursions in town. Upon being moved to a more secure prison, Flinders placed Trim locally with “a French lady” and her young daughter for safekeeping, but Trim disappeared within two weeks. Despite newspaper notices offering a reward, Flinders never saw Trim again and never learned what happened to him.

== Description ==
Trim was a bicolour cat, being black with white paws, chin and chest. He was named after the butler in Laurence Sterne's novel Tristram Shandy, because Flinders considered him to be a faithful and affectionate friend. During his imprisonment, Flinders wrote a biographical tribute to Trim in which he described him as "one of the finest animals I ever saw... [his] robe was a clear jet black, with the exception of his four feet, which seemed to have been dipped in snow and his under lip, which rivaled them in whiteness. He had also a white star on his breast."

== Legacy ==
Flinders wrote of Trim while still captive on the Isle de France in 1809.

In 1996, a bronze statue of Trim by sculptor John Cornwell was erected on a window ledge of the Mitchell Library in Sydney, directly behind a statue of his owner that was erected following the donation of Flinders' personal papers to the Library by his grandson in 1925. The popularity of the statue has since led to the development of a range of Trim merchandise by the State Library of New South Wales. The Library's cafe is also named after the cat.

The plaque under it says:

TO THE MEMORY OF

TRIM
The best and most illustrious of his race
The most affectionate of friends,
faithful of servants,
and best of creatures
He made the tour of the globe, and a voyage to Australia,
which he circumnavigated, and was ever the
delight and pleasure of his fellow voyagers
Written by Matthew Flinders in memory of his cat
Memorial donated by the North Shore Historical Society

which is a part of the epitaph that Flinders had promised Trim.

Trim also features on the first statue of Flinders to be erected in England, which can be found in Donington, Lincolnshire, the birthplace of Flinders, and where his remains were reburied in 2024.

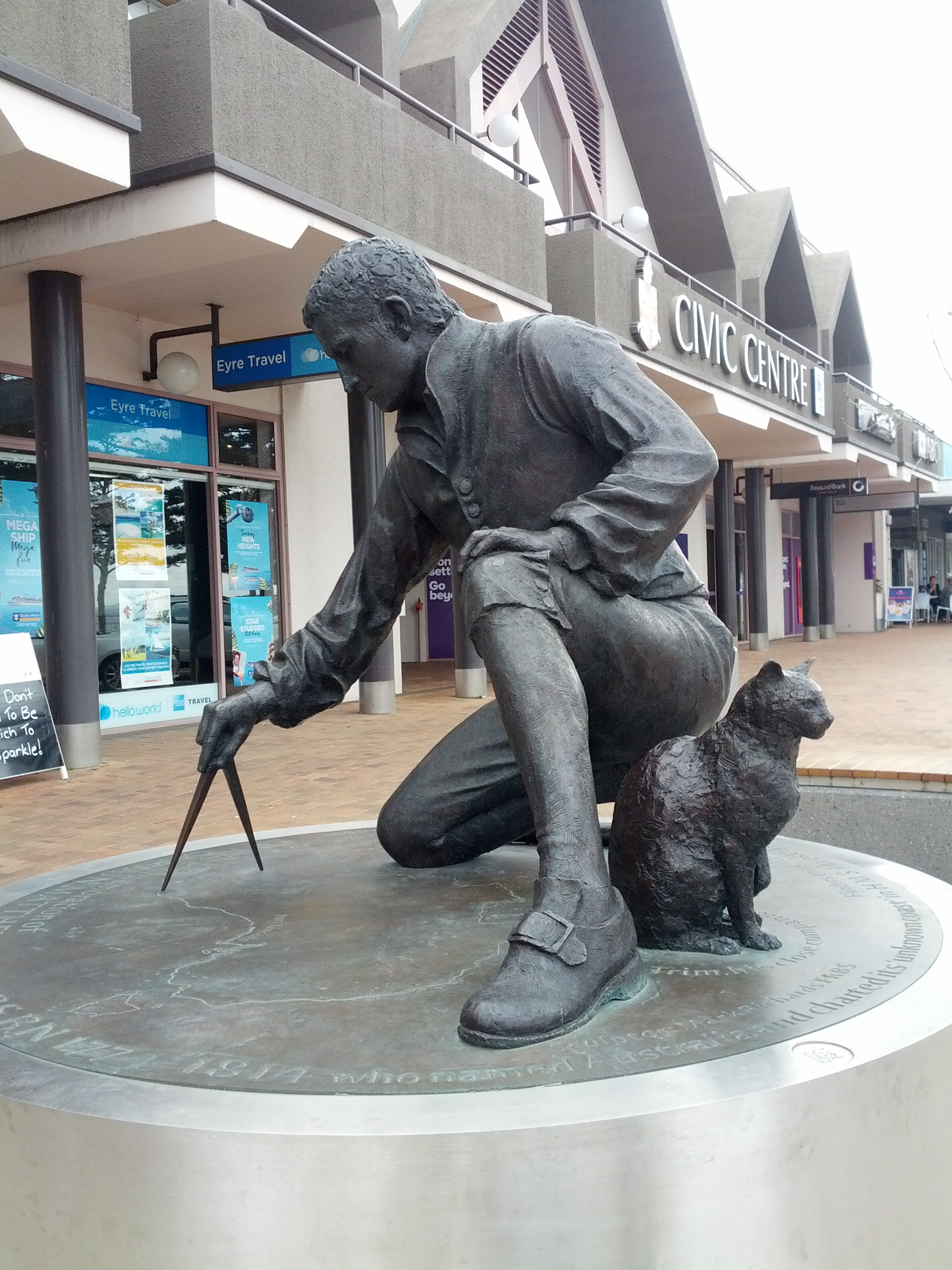
Trim, the boat cat, with Flinders. Port Lincoln, South Australia

In addition, a large bronze statue of Matthew and Trim stands at Euston Railway Station in London, near where he was originally buried. A cast of the same statue is in Port Lincoln, South Australia, and another cast of the same statue is also at the Flinders University campus in Adelaide, South Australia. A smaller version is on display in Lincoln Cathedral.

In Australian author Bryce Courtenay's 2002 novel, Matthew Flinders' Cat, both the cat and the library statue feature as major characters.

== See also ==
- List of individual cats
