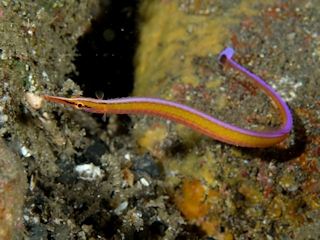
- Maroubra yasudai

Scientific classification
- Domain: Eukaryota
- Kingdom: Animalia
- Phylum: Chordata
- Class: Actinopterygii
- Order: Syngnathiformes
- Family: Syngnathidae
- Subfamily: Syngnathinae
- Genus: Maroubra; Whitley, 1948

Type species
- Maroubra perserrata Whitley, 1948

= Maroubra (fish) =

Genus of fishes

Maroubra is a genus of pipefishes with one species, M. perserrata, endemic to Australia and the other, M. yasudai, endemic to Japan.

== Species ==
The currently recognized species in this genus are:

- Maroubra perserrata Whitley, 1948 (sawtooth pipefish)
- Maroubra yasudai C. E. Dawson, 1983 (orange pipefish)
