= Maroubra perserrata =

Sawtooth pipefish

Conservation status
- Least Concern (IUCN 3.1)

Scientific classification
- Kingdom: Animalia
- Phylum: Chordata
- Class: Actinopterygii
- Division: Teleostei
- Order: Syngnathiformes
- Family: Syngnathidae
- Genus: Maroubra
- Species: M. perserrata

Binomial name
- Maroubra perserrata Whitley 1948

Species of marine fish

Maroubra perserrata, also known as the sawtooth pipefish, is a species of marine fish belonging to the family Syngnathidae. This species can be found at depths up to 20 meters along the coast of Australia from southern Queensland to southern Western Australia. While they can live in many different habitats, they are often found inhabiting openings in reefs and rocks that contain algae and invertebrates, which they likely rely on for camouflage. Reproduction occurs through ovoviviparity in which the males brood eggs for roughly 22 days before giving live birth. Maroubra perserrata is considered more mobile than many pipefish species due to its prehensile tail and reduced caudal fin.
