= They Sailed on Friday =

1957 Australian radio play

- Genre: drama play
- Country of origin: Australia
- Language: English
- Syndicates: ABC
- Written by: William Jenner
- Original release: 1957

They Sailed on Friday is a 1957 Australian radio play by William Jenner about an incident in the life of Matthew Flinders.

The play was produced again in 1958.

The Age radio critic said "it was a documentary rather than a drama but it was well put together and presented."

Leslie Rees regarded it as one of the best Australian radio plays of the 1950s.

== Premise ==
"A little-known episode in the life of Matthew Flinders. Flinders, the first to circumnavigate Australia and chart many previously unexplored coasts, left Sydney Cove in 1803 in H.M.S. Porpoise, together with two other smaJl ships. Cato and Bridgewater. Flinders’ ship and Cato ran on to reefs of the Great Barrier, off what is now Queensland. To those on Bridgewater, it seemed that all those aboard the two wrecked ships would be lost— and yet the Bridgewater sailed off. leaving them to their fate. Fortunately, the resourceful leader, Flinders, was able to take charge and organise life on the tiny sand banks on the reef. He then set off in a cutter manned by oarsmen to bring help from Svdney, 750 miles away. "

== Cast of 1957 production ==
- Owen Weingott as Flinders
- Bruce Beeby as Fowler
- Harvey Adams as Official
- Lewis Fiander as Franklyn
- John Tate as Aken, Governor King
- Don Crosby as Parks
- Reg Lye as Smith
- Keith Buckley as Carter
- John Gray as Williams, Lacy
- Charles McCallum as Captain Palmer
- Hilary Bamberger as Miss Howard
- Ailsa Grahame as Mrs. King, Woman Servant
