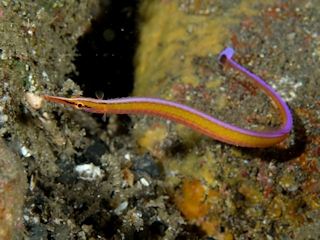
- Maroubra yasudai

Conservation status
- Data Deficient (IUCN 3.1)

Scientific classification
- Kingdom: Animalia
- Phylum: Chordata
- Class: Actinopterygii
- Order: Syngnathiformes
- Family: Syngnathidae
- Genus: Maroubra
- Species: M. yasudai

Binomial name
- Maroubra yasudai Dawson 1983

= Maroubra yasudai =

Orange pipefish

Species of marine fish

Maroubra yasudai, also known as the orange pipefish, is a species of marine fish belonging to the family Syngnathidae. This species can be found in the Izu Oceanic Park along the coast of Honshu Island, Japan. They often inhabit rocky crevices and caves at depths ranging from 28 to 30 meters. Their diet likely consists of small crustaceans such as copepods. Reproduction occurs through ovoviviparity in which the males brood eggs before giving live birth.
