= Robert Kavanaugh =

Robert Murray Kavanaugh
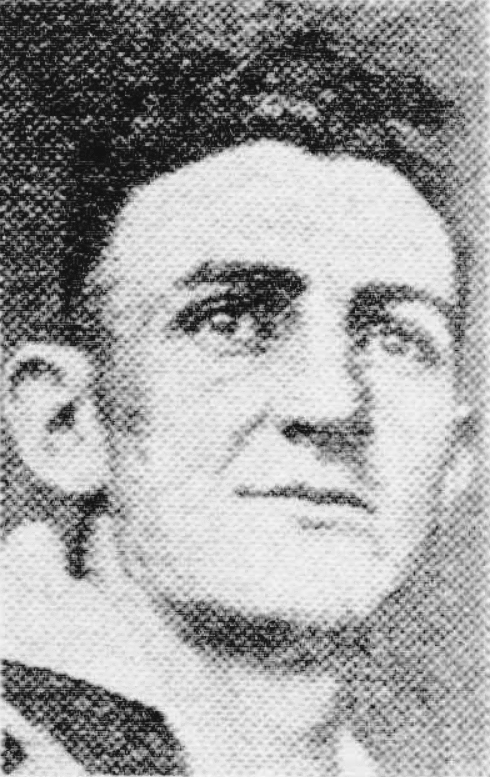
- Born: 18 December 1906; Wingham, New South Wales
- Died: 12 September 1976 (aged 69); Concord, New South Wales
- Occupation(s): Dentist; Royal Australian Air Force officer
- Known for: Albert Medal/George Cross recipient

Robert Murray Kavanaugh GC (18 December 1906 – 12 September 1976) was an Australian recipient of the Albert Medal, formerly the highest decoration for gallantry awarded to civilians or to military personnel for actions "not in the face of the enemy" in the United Kingdom and Commonwealth. A dental student, Kavanaugh was awarded the Albert Medal following his rescue of a youth during a shark attack at Bondi Beach in January 1929. With the establishment of the George Cross, the Albert Medal was discontinued and, in 1971, living recipients of the decoration were invited to exchange their medal for the George Cross; Kavanaugh took up the offer and formally became a recipient of the George Cross.

== Early life and education ==
Kavanaugh was born in Wingham, New South Wales, on 18 December 1906 to Herbert Leo Kavanaugh, a dentist, and his wife Alice Rose (née Flood). In 1917, the family moved to Sydney where Kavanaugh was educated at Waverley and Burwood public schools, as well as by a private tutor. He was active in sport, playing Rugby union for the Eastern Suburbs District Football Club, and belonging to the Sydney Rowing Club and the Kensington Amateur Athletic Association. Aged fifteen, Kavanaugh undertook study through the Dental Board of New South Wales and was apprenticed to his father as a dental student.

== Albert Medal ==
On 12 January 1929, Kavanaugh was swimming at Bondi Beach approximately 45 metres (49 yd) from the shore when fourteen-year-old Colin Stewart was attacked by a shark and dragged underwater. The shark inflicted severe wounds to Stewart's side and hip, and Kavanaugh—who was located only a few metres away—immediately swam to his assistance. The shark made a second pass at Stewart as Kavanaugh neared. Securing a hold on Stewart, Kavanaugh struggled towards the shore. As the pair neared, they were assisted by two other men who dragged Stewart ashore, where he received medical attention before being rushed to hospital. Stewart subsequently died of his injuries the following morning.

The coroner who investigated the incident commented on Kavanaugh's "heroic act", and noted that he should be decorated with the highest honour possible for the circumstances. For his actions, Kavanaugh was subsequently awarded the Surf Life Saving Association of Australia's meritorious award in silver and the Albert Medal. The announcement and accompanying citation for the latter award was published in the London Gazette on 17 October 1930, reading:

Board of Trade, Great George Street, London, S.W. 1. 16th October, 1930.

His Majesty The KING has been graciously pleased to confer the Decoration of the Albert Medal for Gallantry in Saving Life at Sea on Robert Murray Kavanaugh, of Darlinghurst, New South Wales, in recognition, of his gallantry in the following circumstances:—

On the evening of the 12th January, 1929, Colin J. Stewart, a boy of 14 years of age, was bathing at Bondi Beach, New South Wales, some fifty yards from the shore, when he was attacked by a shark which inflicted serious injuries to his right side and hip. Robert Murray Kavanaugh, aged 22 years, of Darlinghurst, New South Wales, who was bathing some few yards from Stewart, without hesitation swam to his assistance and had almost reached him when the shark made a second attack on Stewart. Undeterred by the danger to himself, Kavanaugh secured hold of Stewart and struggled with him towards the shore. He had gone a considerable distance when he was met by two other men and together they carried Stewart to the beach, where he was given medical attention and then conveyed to hospital. Stewart, however, succumbed to his injuries the following morning.

== Later life ==
Following the completion of his apprenticeship, Kavanaugh was registered as a dental surgeon in June 1930. By 1933, he had established his own practice at Narromine. On 22 April that year, he married Mary Sylvia Potter, a stenographer, in a Catholic ceremony at the Sacred Heart Church, Darlinghurst; the pair would later have a son and three daughters. During this time, Kavanaugh obtained a civil flying licence and was active in the local musical and drama societies.

On 7 October 1940, Kavanaugh enlisted in the Royal Australian Air Force for service during the Second World War. Although wishing to be selected as a pilot, he was instead commissioned as a flight lieutenant in the medical branch as a dental officer. Promoted to squadron leader in October 1942, he served throughout the war in Australia. He was last posted to RAAF Station Bradfield Park before taking his discharge on 9 June 1945.

In 1946, Kavanaugh entered the University of Sydney studying for a Bachelor of Dental Surgery degree. During his time at the university, he won the Percy A. Ash Prize in 1948 and the Annie Praed Prize in 1949, before graduating with his degree in 1950. Kavanaugh continued to practice dentistry in Sydney until the late 1950s, when he purchased Karalinga, a sheep station on the Wollondilly River, and entered semi-retirement. In his semi-retirement, Kavanaugh divided his time between Karalinga and serving as a locum tenens dentist.

In 1971, owing to the decline in status and significance of the Albert Medal, the British Government announced that the decoration would be abolished and living recipients would henceforth be regarded as holders of the George Cross. The change came into effect from 21 October, and living recipients were accordingly invited to exchange their medals. All six Australian Albert Medal recipients living at the time opted to accept the offer, Kavanaugh and four others travelling to London to receive their awards. (Note: The sixth, 84-year-old Arthur Bagot, was too ill to make the journey to London.) The five men, Jack Chalmers, Stanley Gibbs, William McAloney, Dick Richards and Kavanaugh, were presented with their George Crosses by Queen Elizabeth II in an investiture ceremony at Buckingham Palace on 12 July 1972.

Kavanaugh died of cardiac failure at the age of 69 at the Repatriation General Hospital, Concord, on 12 September 1976. He was interred in the Field of Mars Cemetery, Sydney, in the Anglican section, in the same grave as his wife Mary Sylvia, who had died on 27 July 1976, aged 68.

== Bibliography ==
- Price, John (2015). Everyday Heroism: Victorian Constructions of the Heroic Civilian. London: Bloomsbury Academic. ISBN 978-1-4742-4795-5.
- Staunton, Anthony (2005). Victoria Cross: Australia's Finest and the Battles they Fought. Prahran, Victoria, Australia: Hardie Grant Books. ISBN 1-74066-288-1.
