= Jack Chalmers =

Australian Albert Medal/George Cross recipient (1894–1982)

John Chalmers
- Born: 11 March 1894; Wellington, New Zealand
- Died: 29 March 1982 (aged 88); Bondi Junction, New South Wales, Australia
- Other names: Jack Chalmers
- Occupations: Engine driver Soldier; Surf Life Saver; Ironworker
- Known for: Albert Medal/George Cross recipient

John Chalmers, GC (11 March 1894 – 29 March 1982) was a New Zealand-born Australian exchange recipient of the George Cross, the highest decoration for gallantry awarded to civilians or to military personnel for actions "not in the face of the enemy" in the United Kingdom and Commonwealth. A member of the North Bondi Surf Life Saving Club, Chalmers was awarded the Albert Medal in 1922 for his actions in rescuing a swimmer during a shark attack at Coogee Beach. With the establishment of the George Cross, the Albert Medal was discontinued and, in 1971, living recipients of the decoration were invited to exchange their medal for the George Cross; Chalmers took up the offer and formally became a recipient of the George Cross.

== Early life and war service ==
Chalmers was born in Wellington, New Zealand, on 11 March 1894 to Scotsman John Chalmers, and his English wife Louise (née Seager). In 1906, Chalmers and his family moved to Sydney, before re-locating to Queensland two years later. During this time, Chalmers gained employment as an engine driver.

On 5 October 1915, Chalmers enlisted in the Australian Imperial Force for service during the First World War. Allotted to the 7th Reinforcements of the 25th Battalion as a private, he embarked from Brisbane aboard HMAT Itonus on 30 December. Arriving in Egypt, Chalmers was re-allocated to the newly formed 47th Battalion on 9 March 1916, following an expansion of the Australian forces. Following a period of training, Chalmers was shipped from Alexandria along with the rest of his battalion in June, bound for the Western Front.

Disembarking at Marseille on 9 June 1916, the 47th Battalion moved into the trenches the following month, where it took part in its first major action of the war at Pozières. For the remainder of the year, Chalmers served alternating stints in the trenches and training behind the frontlines with his battalion. Having contracted trench foot, Chalmers was evacuated to England for treatment in February 1917. During this time, Chalmers married Jessie Alice Courtenay at the register office, Dorset, on 30 July 1917; the pair were later to have a son and a daughter. Having sufficiently recovered, he rejoined the 47th Battalion in France during September.

Serving at Messines and Passchendaele, Chalmers was transferred to the 45th Battalion on 25 April 1918. Following action at Amiens, he was granted three weeks leave to the United Kingdom in September. Following the Armistice, Chalmers returned to Australia on 3 July 1919 and was discharged from the Australian Imperial Force on 18 October.

Re-settling in Sydney with his wife, Chalmers joined the North Bondi Surf Life Saving Club. In 1921, he won belt races at several beaches around Sydney, and won the Australian Lifesaving Belt Championship the following year.

== Albert Medal ==
On 4 February 1922, Chalmers was on duty at Coogee Beach when Milton Coughlan, a body surfer, was attacked by a shark. Tying a line around his waist, Chalmers scrambled across the rocks where he slipped becoming dazed. Despite this, he dived into the water and swam out to Coughlan. Chalmers grabbed hold of him, and the pair were assisted ashore by Frank Beaurepaire. Coughlan was rushed to hospital with extensive injuries to his arms, where he died soon after admission.

Chalmers actions during the incident were widely publicised in the media, with The Sydney Mail describing the rescue as "one of the most glorious deeds of gallantry ever recorded in Australia". Both Chalmers and Beaurepaire were awarded medals from the Royal Shipwreck Relief & Humane Society of New South Wales and the Surf Life Saving Association of New South Wales. On 7 July 1922, the announcement and accompanying citation for Chalmers to be awarded the Albert Medal was published in the London Gazette, reading:

Board of Trade, Great George Street, London, S.W. 1.

His Majesty The KING has been graciously pleased to confer the Decoration of the Albert Medal upon Jack Chalmers, of Sydney, New South Wales.

The following, is an account of the services in respect of which the Decoration has been conferred: —

On the 4th February, 1922, Milton Coughlan was swimming just outside the breakers at Coogee Beach, Sydney, N.S. Wales, when he was attacked by a shark, which bit deeply into his left forearm. Freeing himself, he fought and drove away the shark, which, however, returned and succeeded in establishing a hold on his right arm, but the grip was again broken.

Observing what had happened, Jack Chalmers had a line tied round his waist, and immediately dashed across the rocks to the rescue, and although he slipped and fell, and was momentarily stunned through his head coming into contact with a rock, he quickly recovered, plunged into the water and swam out to Coughlan, who was floating helplessly in the water; Chalmers caught hold of him round the body, and held him until they were both hauled in to the rocks.

The injured bather's arms were practically bitten through and the flesh torn from them, and the unfortunate man succumbed to his injuries shortly after reaching hospital.

Jack Chalmers undoubtedly fully realised the risk he was incurring, and showed extraordinary gallantry in going to Coughlan's rescue in the circumstances. That the danger was considerable is clear from the fact that a number of sharks were seen swimming around the spot where the rescue occurred immediately after the bather was lifted ashore.

Chalmers and Beaurepaire were both granted life memberships with the Coogee Surf Life Saving Club and North Bondi Surf Life Saving Clubs for their efforts during the rescue. Following fund raising by the public, Chalmers was given £3,000, which he used to repay the mortgage on his home and place a deposit on a truck.

== Later life ==
In 1971, owing to the decline in status and significance of the Albert Medal, the British Government announced that the decoration would be abolished and living recipients would henceforth be regarded as holders of the George Cross. The change came into effect from 21 October, and living recipients were accordingly invited to exchange their medals. All six Australian Albert Medal recipients living at the time opted to accept the offer, Chalmers and four others travelling to London to receive their awards. (Note: The sixth, 84-year-old Arthur Bagot, was too ill to make the journey to London.) The five men, Stanley Gibbs, Robert Kavanaugh, William McAloney, Dick Richards and Chalmers, were presented with their George Crosses by Queen Elizabeth II in an investiture ceremony at Buckingham Palace on 12 July 1972.

Chalmers retained his affiliation with the Surf Life Saving Association for the rest of his life, later being presented with their twenty-five and fifty-year service awards. During his life, Chalmers was employed as an ironworker, and later a rigger, at the Balmain shipyards. Aged 88, Chalmers died at his home in Bondi Junction on 29 March 1982; his ashes were scattered on Bondi Beach.

== Bibliography ==
- Price, John (2015). Everyday Heroism: Victorian Constructions of the Heroic Civilian. London: Bloomsbury Academic. ISBN 978-1-4742-4795-5.
- Staunton, Anthony (2005). Victoria Cross: Australia's Finest and the Battles they Fought. Prahran, Victoria, Australia: Hardie Grant Books. ISBN 1-74066-288-1.
