= William McAloney =

Australian air force officer (1910–1995)

- McAloney c. 1985
- Born: 12 May 1910; Adelaide, South Australia
- Died: 31 August 1995 (aged 85); Sandringham, Victoria
- Military career
- Allegiance: Australia
- Branch: Citizen Military Force; Royal Australian Air Force
- Service years: 1925–1929; 1936–1966
- Rank: Group captain
- Commands: Engineering Squadron, Aircraft Research and Development Unit
- Conflicts: Second World War; New Guinea campaign; Malayan Emergency
- Awards: George Cross; Officer of the Order of the British Empire

William Simpson McAloney, GC, OBE (12 May 1910 – 31 August 1995) was an Australian air force officer who was a senior engineering officer in the Royal Australian Air Force (RAAF) and an Australian exchange recipient of the George Cross, the highest civil decoration for heroism in the United Kingdom and formerly in the Commonwealth. Born in Adelaide, he worked as a mechanic before enlisting in the RAAF as an aircraft engine fitter in 1936. In August the following year, he attempted to rescue the pilot of a crashed Hawker Demon aircraft engulfed in flames at an airfield in Hamilton, Victoria. The first on scene, McAloney rushed into the wreckage in an effort to extract the unconscious pilot. The pilot's leg was trapped, however, and while struggling to free it one of the wing tanks burst, knocking McAloney unconscious. McAloney was pulled from the aircraft suffering severe burns and spent the next month in hospital. He was subsequently awarded the Albert Medal for his actions in the rescue attempt.

McAloney sufficiently recovered to return to his work in the RAAF, and during the Second World War was primarily involved in engine repair and engineering staff work in Australia. Commissioned as a flying officer in 1942, he saw service in Dutch New Guinea during late 1944. He received a permanent commission in the RAAF in 1948, and was advanced to squadron leader in 1950. During the Malayan Emergency, he served as technical officer to both No. 90 Wing and No. 1 Squadron, based in Singapore. In 1960, he was made Officer Commanding Engineering Squadron at the Aircraft Research and Development Unit, and was appointed an Officer of the Order of the British Empire for his efforts in the post. McAloney retired in 1966 with the honorary rank of group captain. In 1971, the Albert Medal was discontinued and living recipients of the decoration were invited to exchange their medal for the George Cross; McAloney took up the offer and formally became a recipient of the latter. He died in 1995 at the age of 85.

== Early life ==
McAloney was born on 12 May 1910 in Adelaide, South Australia, the eldest son and second of six children of William Samuel McAloney and his wife Mary (née Murphy). The young McAloney was educated at Thebarton Technical High School and the Adelaide School of Mines. In 1925, McAloney registered for compulsory military training in the Citizen Military Force, serving as a private with the 43rd Battalion until November 1929. During this time, he gained employment as an automotive mechanic with Vrai Ltd, where he received on-the-job training in place of a formal apprenticeship. McAloney was employed with Vrai for three years, before he took a position with Adelaide Car Service.

In 1931, McAloney purchased a garage and engineering workshop in Wirrulla. He operated the establishment for the next five years, the business conducting work on various types of vehicle including cars, trucks and tractors. However, the business ultimately experienced financial difficulties and was forced to close. In a ceremony on 24 June 1935, McAloney wed Dora Winifred Johnson. The couple had seven children: sons William (Bill), John and Paul; and daughters Glenice, Rae, Anne and Judith.

== Military career ==
=== Airman and Albert Medal ===
In light of his business closure, McAloney was forced to seek alternate employment and he consequently enlisted in the Royal Australian Air Force on 1 July 1936. Ranked aircraftman, he completed a fitters course and qualified as an aero fitter and turner before being attached to No. 1 Squadron at RAAF Base Laverton, Victoria, in September. He was employed in a maintenance role within the unit, working on the Jupiter Gipsy and Rolls-Royce Kestrel engines of Bristol Bulldog and Hawker Demon aircraft respectively. During 1937, McAloney completed a part-time air gunner course. His first child, a son named William, was born later that year.

On 31 August 1937, three Hawker Demon aircraft of No. 1 Squadron were on a training flight, during which they landed at an air base in Hamilton, Victoria. The exercise coincided with the local agricultural show, and the planes briefly provided a stationary display for the public. Recommencing their journey, the first aircraft had already taken off when the second was seen to have difficulties. The pilot, Pilot Officer Kenneth McKenzie, had attempted a climbing turn when the aircraft's engine stalled, sending the machine into a dive. McAloney—who was a passenger in the third aircraft—witnessed the incident and signalled for his pilot to stop. On doing this, McAloney immediately leapt out of his plane and ran across the airfield. Out of control, the second aircraft struck the ground and rapidly became engulfed in flames. The first on scene, McAloney dashed into the wreckage in an effort to extradite the two crew members, and was able to grab hold of McKenzie who was sprawled over the flaming main fuel tank. McAloney pulled McKenzie free of the cockpit and down on to the aircraft's wing, though McKenzie's leg became trapped in the wreckage. Despite this, McAloney continued his efforts to free McKenzie, burning his hands on the pilot's smouldering clothes. At this point, one of the wing tanks burst, rendering McAloney unconscious. He was pulled from the aircraft suffering severe burns, and spent the next four weeks in hospital undergoing treatment. Both McKenzie and his observer-gunner, Sergeant Norman Torrens-Witherow, perished and it was later ascertained that, owing to the injuries sustained on impact, they would not have survived even if the rescue attempt had been successful.

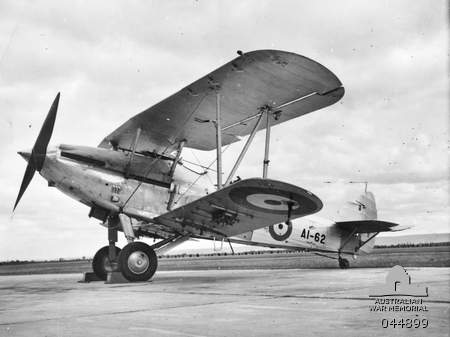
An RAAF Hawker Demon fighter, similar to the downed machine in McAloney's 1937 rescue attempt.

Although McAloney's rescue attempt was unsuccessful, the president of the RAAF court of inquiry into the incident, Squadron Leader Charles Eaton, noted his "conspicuous gallantry" and the coroner publicly commended McAloney's actions. McAloney's efforts that day were ultimately recognised with the award of the Albert Medal, the announcement of which was widely circulated in the press. The notification and accompanying citation for the decoration was published in the London Gazette on 18 February 1938, reading:

Whitehall, February 4, 1938.

His Majesty The KING has been graciously pleased to award the Albert Medal to Aircraftman William Simpson McAloney, Royal Australian Air Force, for conspicuous gallantry in attempting to rescue an officer from the burning wreckage of an aircraft at Hamilton, Victoria, on the 31st August, 1937.

Despite the fact that the aircraft was ablaze from nose to rudder, Aircraftman McAloney dashed into the flames and continued his efforts at rescue until pulled away in an unconscious condition, having received severe burns which necessitated his removal to hospital.

The award of McAloney's Albert Medal is unique, as he is the only member of the RAAF to receive the decoration. The award also proved to be the last Albert Medal bestowed upon a living Australian, with all such subsequent presentations until the medal's discontinuation in 1971 being posthumous.

=== Second World War ===
McAloney was presented with his Albert Medal by the acting Governor-General of Australia, William Vanneck, 5th Baron Huntingfield, in a ceremony at Parliament House, Melbourne on 31 May 1938. McAloney recovered sufficiently from his injuries to return to his duties with the RAAF, and in September was attached to No. 1 Aircraft Depot for a period of three months. During this time he was promoted to leading aircraftman, before returning to service with No. 1 Squadron. He was formally transferred to No. 1 Aircraft Depot from August 1939, and was advanced to corporal on 1 September that year. With the outbreak of the Second World War, McAloney received a rapid series of promotions over the following eighteen months, first to sergeant in April 1940, flight sergeant in March 1941, and finally to warrant officer in February 1942. He was primarily consigned to engine repair and engineering staff work in Australia during the conflict. After making sergeant, he became No. 1 Aircraft Depot's non-commissioned officer in charge of overhaul and test work on the Rolls-Royce Kestrel engine. His duties were expanded with his March 1941 promotion to include the overhaul, inspection and testing of both the Kestrel and Rolls-Royce Merlin aircraft engines.

In August 1941, McAloney was posted to the Directorate of Equipment at RAAF Headquarters, Melbourne. In this capacity he advised on the procurement of equipment and spare parts for RAAF aircraft. He was further tasked with compiling a register of aeroplane equipment at RAAF flight training units and operational bases throughout Australia. The latter entailed McAloney visiting several Air Force units in Victoria, New South Wales and Queensland to check equipment stores. On 1 March 1942, he was commissioned as a flying officer. Transferred to the Directorate of Equipment Administration in July, McAloney was made Officer Commanding Technical and Photographic Staffs and served as a liaison between his own directorate and that of Technical Services.

Promoted to temporary flight lieutenant on 1 August 1943, McAloney was sent to the Directorate of Technical Services from November as the specialist officer on American and gas turbine jet engines. The following November, he was dispatched to Dutch New Guinea to rectify issues being experienced with Pratt & Whitney engines in operations by aircraft of the 1st Tactical Air Force. He returned to Australia and his position with Technical Services in December, and saw out the remainder of the war in this post. McAloney decided he wanted to remain in the Air Force on the cessation of hostilities, and subsequently sought a permanent commission in the post-war RAAF. Having continued on a short-service commission in the meantime, his application was ultimately approved in September 1948 and he was granted the substantive rank of flight lieutenant. His younger brother, Robert Simpson McAloney, also saw service with the RAAF in the Second World War. He had enlisted in late 1937 and rose to the rank of warrant officer before his discharge in 1946, his final posting being to No. 1 Communication Unit.

=== Post-war and senior engineering officer ===
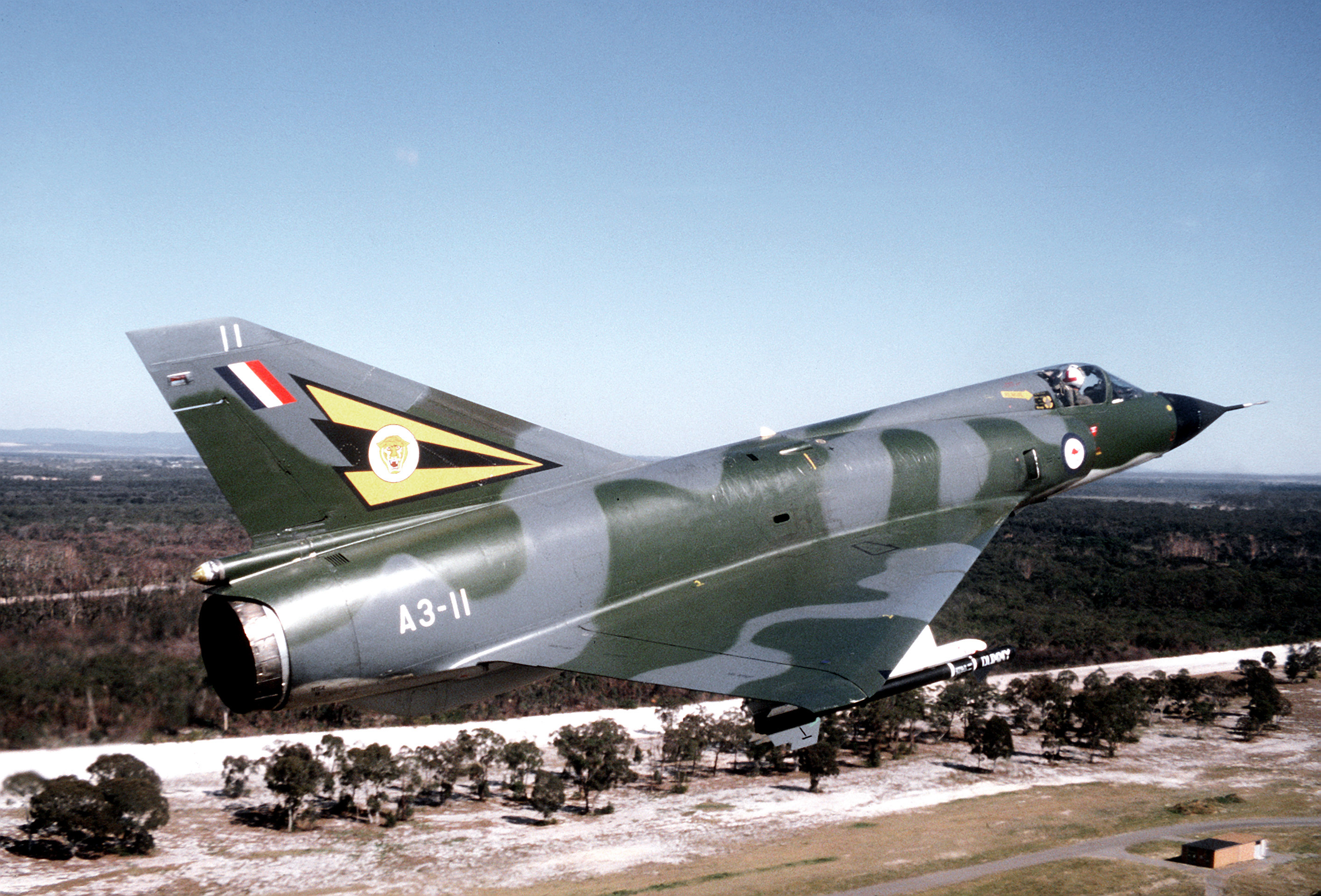
A Mirage IIIO fighter, introduced into the RAAF during the 1960s. McAloney was appointed an OBE in part for his efforts with the aircraft.

In mid-1946, McAloney was involved in an investigation into a series of engine failures experienced by RAAF aircraft. The inquiry led him to visit operational and transport units throughout Australia, in an attempt to determine whether the issues were the result of substandard maintenance or defective components. He returned to his duties at the Directorate of Technical Services on the investigation's conclusion. Made squadron leader in March 1950, he attended a land/air warfare course the following year. McAloney was posted to Singapore in June 1952 as the technical officer to the Changi-based No. 90 (Composite) Wing, formed specifically for service in the Malayan Emergency. The attachment proved short lived with the disbandment of No. 90 Wing in December, at which point McAloney transferred to No. 1 Squadron, then operating out of Tengah.

McAloney returned to Australia in August 1953, his next appointment being to the staff at the Department of Air in Melbourne. He possessed complete administrative control over matters pertaining to aircraft engines in this post, including the acquisition, repairs, modifications and financial expenditure on such. In 1956, he completed a course in industrial mobilisation, later undertaking a unit in industrial electronics. With his January 1957 promotion to wing commander, McAloney was transferred to Maintenance Command, where he held a policy formulation position responsible for the servicing of aircraft. He served three years in this post, being made Officer Commanding Engineering Squadron at the Aircraft Research and Development Unit (ARDU) in October 1960. The function of ARDU was to test aircraft from local and overseas manufacturers, evaluating whether they were suitable for acquisition by the RAAF. McAloney's role focused on the supervision of maintenance for test aircraft, along with completing modifications and fitting specialised equipment trialled at ARDU. The introduction into service of the Mirage IIIO fighter coincided with his time in this post. He was set to retire from the RAAF on reaching the age limit for his rank in 1964, but his appointment was extended a further two years owing to the shortage of technical officers. For his service with ARDU, McAloney was appointed an Officer of the Order of the British Empire in the 1966 New Year Honours. The recommendation for the honour credited McAloney with enhancing the safety record at ARDU, and commended his constant efforts during the adoption of the Mirage and his actions to ensure the serviceability of the diverse variety of aircraft at the unit. He retired from the RAAF on 9 December 1966 and, in recognition of his 30 years of service, was granted the honorary rank of group captain.

== Later life ==
McAloney retired to his home in Sandringham, Victoria, where he indulged his passions in gardening and golf. He was also an active Freemason, and a voracious reader. In 1971, owing to the decline in status and significance of the Albert Medal, the British Government announced that the decoration would be abolished and living recipients would henceforth be regarded as holders of the George Cross. The change came into effect from 21 October, and living recipients were accordingly invited to exchange their medals. All six Australian Albert Medal recipients living at the time opted to accept the offer, McAloney and four others travelling to London to receive their awards. (Note: The sixth, 84-year-old Arthur Bagot, was unable to make the journey to London.) The five men, Jack Chalmers, Stanley Gibbs, Robert Kavanaugh, Dick Richards and McAloney, were presented with their George Crosses by Queen Elizabeth II at an investiture ceremony in Buckingham Palace on 12 July 1972. McAloney later donated his Albert Medal to the RAAF Museum at Point Cook in 1987, where it was placed on display.

McAloney's sons recalled that their father "was a very knowledgeable and intelligent man", who was largely self-taught and a perfectionist in everything he did. But he was also a strict disciplinarian with a strong sense of duty. Severe punishments were handed out for minor infractions, while McAloney could also be obsessive about the family's finances. Though, as Marion Hebblethwaite suggests, his failed business in the 1930s and the duty he shouldered after his father's death—of helping to financially support his mother and some of his younger siblings—may have been the cause for the latter. He did, however, possess a dry sense of humour that appealed to many of his extended family, and his grandchildren thought of him with affection.

Aged 85, Bill McAloney died on 31 August 1995, the fifty-eighth anniversary of his rescue attempt. Remembered as "pleasant and fatherly – almost gracious", his body was cremated at Springvale Botanical Cemetery and the ashes interred at Cheltenham Cemetery, Melbourne. He was survived by his wife and six of their seven children. All three of McAloney's sons continued his tradition of military service. William spent fifteen years in the RAAF, while Paul and John served two tours each with the Australian Army in the Vietnam War. Paul was a corporal in the 6th Battalion, Royal Australian Regiment, while John, as a lieutenant, fought with the 5th and later 4th Battalions of the Royal Australian Regiment. In his first tour, John was awarded the Military Cross for rescuing one of his men and, despite sustaining a wound, personally clearing several caves defended by Viet Cong. He rose to the rank of colonel and commanded the 1st Battalion, Royal Australian Regiment in the mid-1980s before his death in 1991.

== Bibliography ==
- Coulthard-Clark, Chris (1991). The Third Brother: The Royal Australian Air Force 1921–39. Sydney: Allen & Unwin. ISBN 0-04-442307-1.
- Hebblethwaite, Marion (2006). One Step Further: Those Whose Gallantry Was Rewarded with the George Cross. Vol. 6: Book L & M. Witney, Oxfordshire: Chameleon HH Publishing. ISBN 978-0-9546917-7-6.
- Horner, David; Bou, Jean (2008). Duty First: A History of the Royal Australian Regiment (2nd ed.). Crows Nest, New South Wales: Allen & Unwin. ISBN 978-1-74175-374-5.
- Howie, Ann (1991). Who's Who in Australia 1991. Melbourne: Information Australia. OCLC 220918712.
- Price, John (2015). Everyday Heroism: Victorian Constructions of the Heroic Civilian. London: Bloomsbury Academic. ISBN 978-1-4742-4795-5.
- Staunton, Anthony (2005). Victoria Cross: Australia's Finest and the Battles They Fought. Prahran, Victoria: Hardie Grant Books. ISBN 1-74066-288-1.
- Stephens, Alan (1995). Going Solo: The Royal Australian Air Force 1946–1971. Canberra: Australian Government Publishing Service. ISBN 0-644-42803-1.
- Wright, Christopher J.; Anderson, Glenda M., eds. (2013). The Victoria Cross and the George Cross: The Complete History. Vol. III: 1919–2013. York: Methuen. ISBN 978-0-413-77751-5.
