= Fanconi =

Fanconi may refer to:

- Fanconi anemia, a genetic disease
- Fanconi syndrome, a kidney disease
- Guido Fanconi (1892–1979), a Swiss pediatrician
- Arturo Fanconi (1906–1944), a Swiss confectioner who was award the highest medal for lifesaving while serving in the British Royal Navy
