= Stanley Gibbs =

Recipient of the George Cross

Stanley Frederick Gibbs
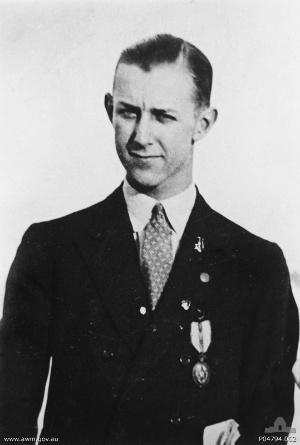
- Stanley Gibbs c.1927
- Born: 2 January 1909; Hunters Hill, New South Wales
- Died: 3 March 1991 (aged 82); Bondi, New South Wales
- Occupations: Shipping clerk, Australian Gas Light Company; Soldier
- Known for: Port Hacking shark attack (1927)
- Awards: Albert Medal (1927; later exchanged for the George Cross [1971]); Royal Humane Society Gold Medal (1927)
- Military career
- Allegiance: Australia
- Branch: Second Australian Imperial Force
- Service years: 1942–1944
- Rank: Private
- Service number: NX87937
- Unit: 35th Battalion
- Conflicts: Second World War

Stanley Frederick Gibbs, GC (2 January 1909 – 3 March 1991) was an Australian shipping clerk and an exchange recipient of the George Cross, the highest civil decoration for heroism in the United Kingdom and formerly in the Commonwealth. On 3 January 1927, the day after his eighteenth birthday, Gibbs went to the rescue of 15-year-old Mervyn Allum during a shark attack at Port Hacking, New South Wales. He managed to fend off the shark by striking at it with his legs and fists and, with the assistance of a friend, pulled Allum clear of the water. Although Allum died from his injuries, Gibbs was publicly praised by the coroner and local community leaders for his actions, and was subsequently awarded the Albert Medal.

Born in Hunters Hill, Sydney, and educated locally, Gibbs was employed by the Australian Gas Light Company (AGL) as a shipping clerk for forty-five years. During the Second World War, he enlisted as a private in the Second Australian Imperial Force in February 1942 and served with the 35th Battalion on home defence and patrolling duties in Sydney and Western Australia for two years. The battalion was deployed to New Guinea in January 1944 for service in the Huon Peninsula campaign, but Gibbs' overseas experience was short lived. He broke his leg on the day of arrival, and spent an extended period in hospitals in New Guinea and Australia. Discharged in December 1944, he returned to his work with AGL. On 21 October 1971, the British Prime Minister announced that the Albert Medal would be discontinued and living recipients would henceforth be regarded as holders of the George Cross. Recipients were given the option of exchanging insignia which Gibbs took up and received the insignia of the George Cross from Queen Elizabeth II at Buckingham Palace in 1972. Aged 82, Gibbs died in Bondi, New South Wales, in 1991.

== Early life ==
Stanley Frederick Gibbs was born in the Sydney suburb of Hunters Hill, New South Wales, on 2 January 1909. Known as "Stan", he was the first of four children to Lindsay Thomas Gibbs and Edith Trevillion, who wed the year of his birth. He was followed by two sisters, Ellen in 1910 and Phyllis in 1912, and a brother, Lindsay, in 1917. The specifics of Gibbs' education are unclear, but he left high school before achieving an Intermediate Certificate and at first worked as a shop assistant in a men's store. Gibbs later gained a position with the Australian Gas Light Company (AGL) as a shipping clerk, and by 1927 was living in the Inner West suburb of Marrickville.

== Port Hacking shark attack ==
On 3 January 1927, following a venture out to Gunnamatta Bay, Gibbs was piloting a launch back into the Grays Point area of Port Hacking when a scream rang out. Gibbs looked up and noticed 15-year-old Mervyn Allum struggling in the water about 20 yards (18 m) from the shore. Subsequent reports indicate that the other bathers first thought that Allum, who was known to be a good swimmer, was drowning. Gibbs, however, quickly realised that the youth's leg had been grabbed by a shark. Gibbs immediately dived into the water and swam towards the scene to render Allum assistance, as the latter struggled to fend off the shark. By now the water was red with blood. As Gibbs grabbed for Allum, the teenager was pulled under water. Gibbs had to strike at the shark with his legs and fists and grasp its dorsal fin before the shark would release its grip. While Gibbs' friend, Donald Campbell, rowed a boat towards the pair, Gibbs maintained a hold on the now unconscious Allum, trod water, and splashed to discourage further attacks. The shark continued to circle below during this time, at one point brushing past Gibbs' feet. As Campbell drew near, he and Gibbs managed to lift Allum aboard before Gibbs pulled himself clear of the water. Gibbs later reported that the flesh had been stripped from the ankle to the thigh on one of Allum's legs, and there was evidence of teeth and bite marks to Allum's hands and stomach; Allum was pronounced dead on arrival at hospital.

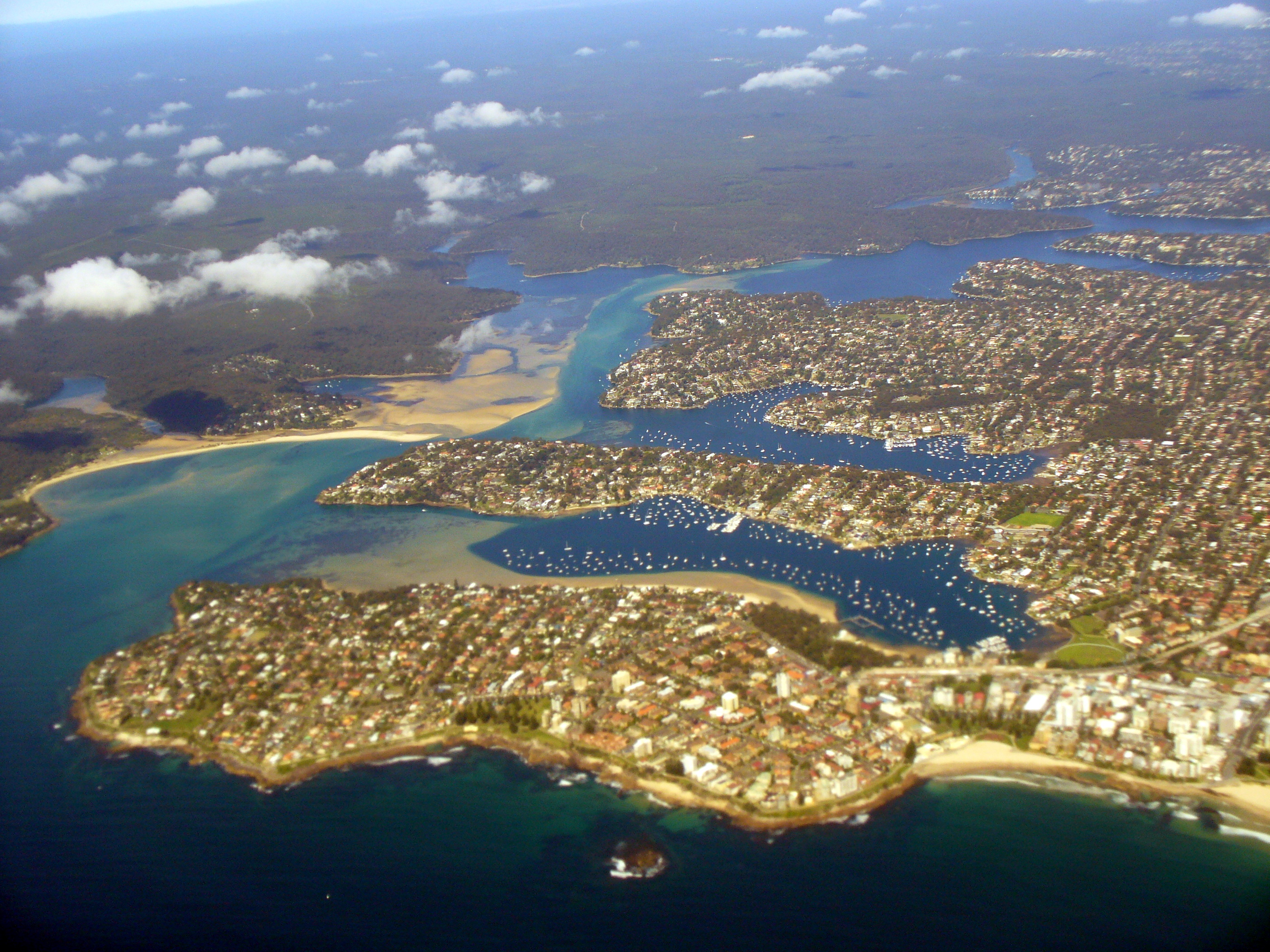
The Port Hacking estuary as seen from the air

According to historian Marion Hebblethwaite, "the tragedy was a very personal one" for Gibbs. Gibbs knew Allum personally and was dating Allum's sister, Vivienne, at the time. Gibbs had celebrated his eighteenth birthday just the day before with Campbell, Vivienne and her sister Wynnes, the four having been camping with family and others at Grays Point over those few days. Vivienne was also present in the launch during the shark attack, and reportedly had to be restrained by another friend to prevent her "from diving to her brother's assistance." Allum's funeral occurred two days later, on 5 January. After a service at Andrews Funerals in Ashfield, Allum was buried in the Presbyterian section of Rookwood Cemetery. Gibbs was among the chief mourners, while attendees included Campbell, local politicians Charles Marr and Milton Jarvie, and members of the 1st Ashfield Boy Scouts (of which Allum had been a member).

A community meeting was subsequently convened at the Marrickville Town Hall on 7 January 1927 to make arrangements to "recognise the conspicuous bravery" of Gibbs. The mayor, Milton Jarvie, described Gibbs' efforts as "one of the most specific acts of gallantry ever recorded" and drew comparisons to the battlefield heroism of the First World War. To much support, Jarvie advocated that a fund be raised to honour Gibbs and that Gibbs' actions be brought to the notice of the Royal Humane Society (RHS) and the governor. Recognition was swift in coming: Gibbs was awarded the Gold Medal of the Royal Shipwreck Relief and Humane Society of New South Wales (the state branch of the RHS) a week later, (Note: Donald Campbell, meanwhile, received a certificate of merit.) while the community fund raised over £400. Gibbs also received an offer to join the local Surf Life Saving Club, but declined. Meanwhile, the coroner reporting into Allum's death released his verdict on 20 January. He praised Gibbs' efforts during the shark attack, commenting that Gibbs' "bravery and self sacrifice merits the award of the Victoria Cross, if such distinction can be accorded to him". Gibbs was ineligible to be considered for the Victoria Cross, his actions being that of a civilian outside of military command and away from a battlefield. However, in recognition of his rescue attempt, Gibbs was subsequently awarded the Albert Medal, a decoration that recognised the saving of life. The notification and accompanying citation for the Albert Medal was published in the London Gazette on 8 February 1927, reading:

Board of Trade, Great George Street, London, S.W. 1. 7th February, 1927.

His Majesty The KING has been graciously pleased to confer the Decoration of the Albert Medal upon Stanley Gibbs of Sydney, New South Wales.

The following is an account of the services in respect of which the Decoration has been conferred:—

On the 3rd January, 1927, at Port Hacking near Sydney, New South Wales, a youth named Mervyn Allum was swimming a short distance from the shore when he was attacked by a large shark. It was at first thought that he was drowning, and Stanley Gibbs, who was standing on the nose of a launch he was driving, ready to give assistance to Allum, observed that he was being attacked by the shark. Gibbs dived from the launch and fought the shark with his hands and feet and eventually succeeded in getting Allum, who was very badly injured, from the jaws of the shark, and with the assistance of a man named Macdonald [sic] placed him in a rowing boat. The victim died of injuries shortly afterwards.

== Career and Second World War ==
Standing beside the Duke and Duchess was the slim figure of a young man, a hero whose dauntless courage had thrilled the hearts of his countrymen, yet whose blanched face told the story of inevitable nervousness in the face of public acclamation. It was Stanley Gibbs the hero of the Port Hacking shark tragedy for part of this great demonstration was for him as well as for the noble pair who shared it with him.

— Sydney Morning Herald, 30 March 1927

Gibbs was presented with his Albert Medal by the Duke of York on 28 March 1927 before a mass of onlookers at Sydney Town Hall. Jarvie, the Marrickville mayor, read Gibbs' citation to the crowd before the duke, to cheers and applause, pinned the medal to Gibb's left breast. After the ceremony, Gibbs' was personally congratulated by several dignitaries (including the Duchess of York) and fellow recipients of the Albert Medal. Among them was Jack Chalmers, who had been recognised for a similar act at Coogee Beach five years earlier. Gibbs gained some level of celebrity following his investiture. He was frequently featured in the press over the following few months, and even became sought after for his autograph. At the Anzac Day commemorations in Melbourne on 25 April, Gibbs was given a place of honour among the state's Victoria Cross recipients at the head of the march. A photograph of Gibbs with Issy Smith VC, captioned "Two Heroes", adorned the pages of The Argus the next day.

The attention did not interfere with Gibbs' professional life, and he continued in his role at AGL. On 20 April 1929, at St Stephen's Church of England in Newtown, Gibbs wed Catherine Charlotte Coulson. Catherine died in November 1933 after little more than four years of marriage, and Gibbs remarried eighteen months later. His second wedding, to Rosamunde Marcelle Walker, occurred at St Stephen's on 20 April 1935, though the marriage was to end in divorce in the 1940s. On 9 February 1942, Gibbs, by now living in Ashbury with his wife and two children, enlisted in the Second Australian Imperial Force (2nd AIF) at Paddington for service in the Second World War.

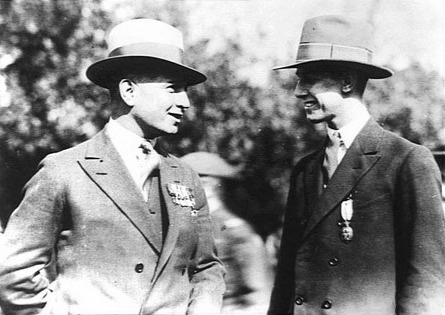
Gibbs (right) with Issy Smith VC at the Melbourne Anzac Day march on 25 April 1927.

Gibbs spent six weeks undergoing exercises with the 8th Training Battalion, before being allocated to the 35th Battalion as a private on 16 March. The 35th, a Militia unit assigned to the 8th Brigade, was employed in the defence of Australia following Japan's entry into the war and was initially posted to the St Ives area of Sydney. From early July the battalion relocated to Western Australia—Gibbs boarded HMAS Manoora in Sydney on 4 July, disembarking at Fremantle ten days later. The 35th Battalion spent the next two years engaged in training exercises and defensive patrols along the coast of Western Australia, spanning from Bunbury in the south to Geraldton in the Mid West. There is little recorded of Gibbs' personal experiences during this time, although he was hospitalised for a month from October to November 1942 following a diagnosis of "neurosis". A year later, he was granted four weeks' leave in Sydney over September and October 1943. During this time, the 35th Battalion moved to Gordonvale, Queensland, in preparation for a deployment to New Guinea, and undertook training in jungle warfare.

The move north came in January 1944, as the 35th Battalion had been earmarked for a role in the Huon Peninsula campaign in north-eastern New Guinea. Accordingly, Gibbs embarked from Cairns on 18 January, arriving at Finschhafen after a week's voyage. Gibbs' experience in New Guinea, however, was brief: the day of his arrival, Gibbs broke his left leg in an accident. After seventeen days at the 2/5th Australian General Hospital, he was transported to Brisbane aboard the hospital ship Manunda. The break necessitated an extended period of hospitalisation in Australia, and led to a downgrading in his medical classification. Gibbs was subsequently discharged from the 2nd AIF on 28 December 1944 to resume his work with AGL, regarded as an "essential occupation" to the war effort. For his service during the Second World War, Gibbs was eligible for the Pacific Star, War Medal 1939–1945 and Australia Service Medal 1939–1945, though he did not claim his medals until 1973.

== George Cross and later life ==
Following his divorce from Rosamunde, Gibbs married for a third time. He wed Doris Mannix at St Matthew's Church of England in Bondi on 9 September 1948. On 21 October 1971, the British Prime Minister Edward Heath in answer to a written question upon notice announced that the Albert medal would be abolished and living recipients would henceforth be regarded as holders of the George Cross. Living recipients were accordingly invited to exchange their medals. All six Australian Albert Medal recipients living at the time opted to accept the offer, Gibbs and four others travelling to London to receive their awards. (Note: The sixth, 84-year-old Arthur Bagot, was unable to make the journey to London.) The five men, Jack Chalmers, Robert Kavanaugh, William McAloney, Dick Richards and Gibbs, were presented with their George Crosses by Queen Elizabeth II in an investiture ceremony at Buckingham Palace on 12 July 1972.

In 1974, during an interview on his Albert Medal actions, Gibbs remarked that he had "never been back to Port Hacking since". He retired from AGL that year after forty-five years service, and settled in Bondi. An enthusiastic sportsman, Gibbs played tennis, golf, football, baseball and, in his twilight years, lawn bowls with the Bronte Bowling Club. In 1977, he was awarded the Queen Elizabeth II Silver Jubilee Medal. Gibbs died in Bondi on 3 March 1991, aged 82. Survived by his third wife, and by a daughter and son from an earlier marriage, Gibbs' body was cremated and his ashes interred at the Eastern Suburbs Memorial Park in Matraville. Gibbs is commemorated by a plaque in the George Cross Park, Canberra.

== Bibliography ==
- Brazier, Kevin (2012). The Complete George Cross: A Full Chronological Record of All George Cross Holders. Barnsley, South Yorkshire: Pen & Sword Military. ISBN 978-1-84884-287-8.
- Hebblethwaite, Marion (2006). One Step Further: Those Whose Gallantry Was Rewarded with the George Cross Volume 4: Book F & G. Witney, Oxfordshire: Chamoleon HH Publishing. ISBN 978-0-9546917-5-2.
- Price, John (2015). Everyday Heroism: Victorian Constructions of the Heroic Civilian. London: Bloomsbury Academic. ISBN 978-1-4742-4795-5.
- Staunton, Anthony (2005). Victoria Cross: Australia's Finest and the Battles they Fought. Prahran, Victoria: Hardie Grant Books. ISBN 978-1-74066-288-8.
