= Issy Smith =

Recipient of the Victoria Cross

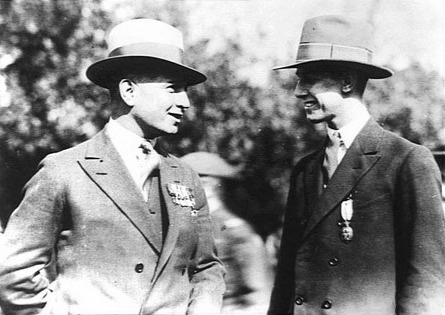
- Smith (left) attending an Anzac Day parade in 1927. On the right is Stanley Gibbs, recipient of the Albert Medal.
- Born: 18 September 1890; Constantinople, Ottoman Empire
- Died: 10 September 1940 (aged 49); Melbourne, Victoria, Australia
- Burial place: Fawkner Memorial Park
- Military career
- Allegiance: United Kingdom
- Branch: British Army
- Service years: 1904–1912,1912-1914; 1914–1919
- Rank: Sergeant
- Units: 1st Battalion, The Manchester Regiment
- Conflicts: World War I; Western Front; Second Battle of Ypres; Mesopotamian campaign; Palestine
- Awards: Victoria Cross; Croix de Guerre (France); Cross of St. George (Russia)

Issy Smith VC (18 September 1890 – 10 September 1940) was a British-Australian recipient of the Victoria Cross (VC), the highest award for gallantry in the face of the enemy that can be awarded to eligible forces of the Commonwealth and United Kingdom.

Born Ishroulch Shmeilowitz (and other renderings), to parents residing in Turkey, Smith travelled to Britain as a child stowaway and enlisted in the British Army in 1904. He emigrated to Australia after he had transferred to the reserve, where he remained until mobilised as a reservist in 1914. As an Acting Corporal in the 1st Battalion, The Manchester Regiment, Smith was engaged in the Second Battle of Ypres. On 26 April 1915, Smith, on his own initiative, recovered wounded soldiers while exposed to sustained fire and attended to them "with the greatest devotion to duty regardless of personal risk". His conduct secured a recommendation for the Victoria Cross, which was awarded to Smith in August 1915.

After his demobilisation, Smith returned to Australia with his wife and daughter. He became a prominent figure in Melbourne's Jewish community, was appointed a Justice of the Peace, and unsuccessfully stood as a candidate for the United Australia Party in the 1931 general election.

== Early life ==
Smith was born in Constantinople, the son of Moses and Eva Shmeilowitz, who were of Russian Empire Jewish origin. They met in Berdychiv and later relocated to Odessa. They left Rostov-on-Don in 1888 for Turkey. They relocated to Egypt at the start of the 1900s. Although it was alleged his father was employed by the French Consulate-General as a clerk in Egypt, 'this has to be completely false. Moses would have been nearly 80 years of age by the time he took the job –and he spoke no French' Eva worked as a seamstress, and Moses worked a sewing machine. It is not clear what other work he obtained. (Note: The occupation of Moses was recorded as "Tailor" on Issy's wedding certificate.)

Aged 11, Smith embarked as a stowaway aboard a vessel proceeding to London, where his elder brothers had migrated to. Undaunted by this unfamiliar environment, Smith attended Berner Street School, Commercial Street, London, and worked as a deliverer in the East End, then an impoverished ghetto where Yiddish was the predominant spoken language. Persecution and extreme deprivation had compelled millions of Eastern European Jews to migrate to Western Europe, the Americas, and elsewhere. By the time of Issy Smith's arrival, Jewish immigration to Britain had peaked but was curtailed by the enactment of the Aliens Act in 1905.

It was theorised that the pseudonym Issy Smith was adopted, in the process of enlisting, at the behest of a recruiting sergeant. This legend has been dismissed as apocryphal, as this surname was already used by his brothers Jacob and Joseph and Morris who lived in London. He joined the militia on 21 April 1904, giving a declared age of 17 years, 8 months. He was working as a plumber, living in Manchester. He enlisted under regular terms of service in the British Army on 2 September 1904, giving a declared age of 18 years, joining as a private in the Manchester Regiment. Smith completed his training, later he was posted to South Africa on 15 March 1906. From here, he was then sent on 28 October 1906 to India to join the 1st Battalion, as part of a draft, commanded by Captain Hubert Greenhill Chapman, that embarked at Durban aboard RIMS Dufferin, and disembarked at Bombay on 6 November 1906. At the time of the 1911 census, he was stationed at Kamptee Cantonment in the Nagpur division within India. He boxed competitively. He was the middleweight champion of his battalion. He entered the 1911 Delhi Durbar boxing competition, but was eliminated in the second round on points. A tailor's copy of the Delhi Durbar Medal (1911) was among his mounted medals. He was appointed Lance Corporal on 8 June 1912.

He embarked RIMS Dufferin, departed Karachi on 20 September 1912, disembarked at Southampton on 11 October 1912, then headed to the discharge depot at Fort Brockhurst. He was transferred to the army reserve on 15 October 1912, after eight years of service with the colours. A newspaper article states that upon returning to London from India, he was greeted at the railway station by his brother, accompanied by Elsie, who would later become his wife. A surviving letter, written in Elsie's hand, does suggest that the railway "story" is a journalist's work of fiction. (Elsie's sister would marry Alfred Burley, a colleague of Issy in the same battalion.) He changed from Army Reserve Section A, with its higher pay but the soldier was not permitted 'to reside out of the United Kingdom', to Army Reserve Section B on 20 May 1914. Smith emigrated to Australia, after brief employment in London, disembarking in June 1914. He lived in the Melbourne suburb of Ascot Vale while working for the city's gas company.

== World War I ==
Given that he was retained as a reservist until 1 September 1916, for the remainder of his 12-year engagement, Smith was mobilised by the British Army after the commencement of hostilities in August 1914, (Note: His Majesty the King, having been graciously pleased to direct by proclamation, that the Army Reserve be called out on permanent service, all men belonging to the said Reserve are required to report themselves on such date and at such places as they may be directed to attend for the purpose of joining the Imperial Army. If they do not receive any such directions, or if they have changed their address since last pay day, they will report themselves by letter to the Officer Paying Pensions and Reserves, Foresters' Hall, 168 Latrobe Street, Melbourne. The necessary instructions as to their joining will then be given.) as were his reservist comrades back in the UK. (Note: The order for the general mobilisation came [late] on Tuesday night, and for the next day or two [5th August onwards,] Reservists were pouring into the Ashton Barracks... The streets were alive with the military, owing to the fact that mobilisation was taking place simultaneously at two centres, viz., the depot of the Manchester Regiment, Ashton Barracks, and [Territorials at] the Armoury, Old-street.) He was one of more than 200 Imperial reservists that were mobilised in Victoria. Some contemporary newspaper articles sources state that Smith was present at the capture of German New Guinea by the Australian Naval and Military Expeditionary Force. (Note: The Daily Mail says: "Acting Corporal Issy Smith V.C. was a reservist of the 1st [Battalion] Manchester Regiment living in Australia when the war broke out. With an Australian force he assisted in the capture of German New Guinea.") This is implausible as there is nothing stated within official documentation to support this claim.

He reported for duty at Victoria Barracks, Melbourne, headquarters (3rd Military District), on 10 August, and embarked SS Miltiades on 21 October 1914. He arrived at Plymouth on 18 December 1914. His service record states that he was posted to the regimental depot, Ashton-under-Lyne, on 19 December 1914, whereupon he was appointed Acting Corporal that same day. He was duly posted to the 3rd (Reserve) Battalion on 6 January 1915. The 3rd (Reserve) Battalion was at Cleethorpes. The 3rd (Reserve) Battalion was a pool of trained men, from which reinforcements were sent to the Western Front. On 23 February 1915 he disembarked in France. After spending time at Rouen, he was posted to the front on 9 March 1915.

Having actively engaged in the battles of Givenchy and Neuve Chapelle, the 1st Manchesters had already incurred hundreds of casualties by the beginning of "Second Ypres" on 22 April 1915. Chemical warfare first emerged on the Western Front during the German offensive, and Smith himself would be temporarily incapacitated by gas. The 1st Manchesters were involved in an initially successful counter-attack conducted by the Jullundur and Ferozepore brigades on 26 April 1915, near Wieltje, in conjunction with other Allied units. Rudimentary forms of protection against the chlorine gas proved ineffectual, limiting the advance and causing many soldiers to succumb to its effects.

During the Allied counter-attack, Smith, of his own volition, ventured towards a German position to attend to a severely wounded soldier. He carried him some 250 yards (230 m) to relative safety while exposed to intense German fire. According to the Victoria Cross citation, he brought in "many more wounded men" throughout the day under similarly perilous conditions "regardless of personal risk". Recounting his own rescue by Smith to a Daily Mail correspondent, Sergeant Rooke said of the corporal: "He behaved with wonderful coolness and presence of mind the whole time, and no man deserved a Victoria Cross more thoroughly than he did".

No. 168 Acting Corporal Issy Smith, 1st Battalion, The Manchester Regiment.
For most conspicuous bravery on 26 April 1915, near Ypres, when he left his Company on his own initiative and went well forward towards the enemy's position to assist a severely wounded man, whom he carried a distance of 250 yards into safety, whilst exposed the whole time to heavy machine-gun and rifle fire.

Subsequently Corporal Smith displayed great gallantry, when the casualties were very heavy, in voluntarily assisting to bring in many more wounded men throughout the day, and attending to them with the greatest devotion to duty regardless of personal risk.

The London Gazette, 20 August 1915

Smith was gassed in April and May 1915. (Note: 'We were relieved by the Highland Light Infantry about 3 o'clock on the morning of April 27th... I was slightly gassed, and was carried to the first aid post. I lay there very sick for about 24 hours, but would not leave the battalion, as I wanted to see the fight through.... On the night of the 19th May the Connaught Rangers came to relieve us... I was gassed badly this time, and had to be removed to hospital, and I would hardly be so well to-day only for the constant attention which we wounded get at this hospital in Mountjoy square.') In June, he was being treated at No. 6 Stationary Hospital at Le Havre. Smith's service record suggests that he was medically evacuated from France in August 1915. Smith was hospitalised in Dublin, Ireland, where he recuperated from his gassing. (Note: 'Dublin Jews yesterday morning besieged the Dublin University V.A.D. Auxiliary Hospital in Mountjoy square, for one of the inmates; Corporal Issy Smith, one of their co-religionists, had just been awarded the V.C. Corporal Smith had been in the hospital since August 8th.... it was not long before they went, in ones and twos and dozens, to the hospital at Mountjoy square, where he has been slowly recovering from the effects of gas poisoning since August 8th.') His Victoria Cross was later presented to him at Buckingham Palace by King George V. (Note: The younger woman in the photo described as his sister is in fact his fiancé Elsie, the identity of the woman described as his Mother is unknown.) He was feted by publications such as The Jewish Chronicle, and his status as a recipient of the VC was utilised by the British government for the purposes of stimulating further recruitment. His visits to Jewish communities in the United Kingdom generated much interest, attracting dignitaries and large crowds in the process. On one such occasion, in September 1915, he was invited back to his old school in the East End to receive a gold watch and chain in honour of his Victoria Cross. Also that month, Smith was received at Mansion House, Dublin, by the Under-Secretary for Ireland, Matthew Nathan, who took advantage of the occasion to reaffirm loyalty to both Britain and Ireland. Contemporaries, however, continued to report instances of discrimination against Jewish servicemen, including an incident involving Issy Smith in Leeds. While documenting his recruitment drive, The Jewish Chronicle reported that the proprietor of the Grand Restaurant had refused to serve Smith during his tour of Yorkshire because he was Jewish, while indicating the staff were prepared to accept his non-Jewish acquaintance. Smith's tour continued otherwise without disruption, taking him to Edinburgh, Scotland. His appointed rank changed from Acting Corporal to unpaid Acting Lance Sergeant on 5 October 1915, then he was promoted to Sergeant on 7 March 1916. His partial recovery from gassing meant that, for accounting purposes, he was taken on the strength of the 3rd (Reserve) Battalion from 15 December 1915, as opposed to the Depot, which was associated with hospitalised men. It was during 1916 that he participated in charity boxing matches.

Meanwhile, on the Western Front, the demoralised and depleted Indian Corps fought its final European battle at Loos. With the exception of two cavalry divisions, the Indian Corps in Europe redeployed to the Middle East theatre, sailing from Marseille on 10 December 1915 and arriving in Basra on 8 January 1916 to be integrated into the Mesopotamian Expeditionary Force.

Smith returned to active duty as a sergeant. He was posted to the 1st Battalion on 4 September 1916, serving in Mesopotamia. Within a fortnight of arriving at Basra, he was hospitalised with malaria. After the capture of Baghdad on 11 March 1917, Smith's nose was broken by a shell during the subsequent fighting. He transferred to the Royal Engineers on 1 April 1917. He was granted leave, which he took in Egypt in May 1917, and is understood to have seen his family. He was hospitalised on 5 August 1917, accidentally receiving a large cut to his right knee whilst on duty. A letter sent by Smith in 1940 gave an outline of his service history. He took part in the fall of Baghdad, was transferred to the IWT branch of the Royal Engineers, and was redeployed to Palestine. (Note: 'After the fall of Jerusalem, I was attached to G.S.I., General Allenby's Headquarters until demobilised in 1919.') In January 1918, he was treated at Port Said for emphysema. He was hospitalised at the start of September, and was discharged on 19 September 1918.' He was discharged from hospital on 21 November 1918, and returned to Cairo. He had been wounded five times, according to the Australian Dictionary of Biographies, as derived from obituaries in September 1940. Two contemporary interwar newspaper articles state it was four times. The family are in possession of the four wound stripes that he wore on his uniform, which can be seen on his wedding photo. Smith embarked at Port Said on 17 January 1919. Upon returning to Britain in February 1919, he got married, and was discharged from the army on 30 April 1919.

A wartime photograph of Smith has him wearing his VC, a Russian Cross of St. George (4th class) awarded concurrently with his VC, and his tailor's copy of a Durbar commemorative medal. In postwar photos, he is also wearing a trio of WW1 campaign medals, along with the French Croix de Guerre, with bronze palm. (Note: There is no official documentation in support of his Croix de Guerre, in either French or English.)

Demobilised after the war, Smith returned to London. As a war hero, he was intermittently invited to social functions. In June 1920, he attended a garden party at Buckingham Palace, given by the king for all surviving Victoria Cross recipients. They included veterans of the Indian Mutiny, Rorke's Drift, Relief of General Gordon, the First and Second Boer Wars, countless campaigns on the borders of the empire, and dozens from the Great War. He was chosen as a guard of honour, accompanying 73 other holders of the Victoria Cross, at the Burial of the Unknown Warrior, Westminster Abbey, 11 November 1920, in the presence of the King. (It was mis-reported in an obituary in a Tasmanian newspaper that 'After the war [Issy] was chosen as a member of the late King's personal bodyguard when he visited India'.) On 9 October 1921, with Harry Kenny, he unveiled the Hackney War Memorial. In 1922, he attended "The Pilgrimage to Ypres", in Belgium, laying a wreath at the Cloth Hall there.

== Legacy ==
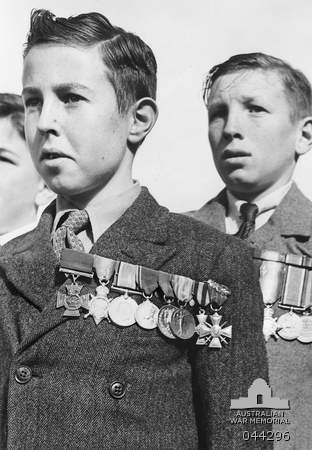
Maurice Smith (centre) wearing his father's medals

Despite his fame and popularity, like many former servicemen contending with post-war economic hardship, Smith struggled financially – a predicament compounded by illness. As a consequence he pawned his medals for £20, only for them to be recovered by the Jewish Historical Society on the urging of the wife of Chief Rabbi Joseph Hertz and ultimately reunited with Smith. Smith's varied occupations in post-war Britain included work as an actor with a theatre troupe. He had married his wife Elsie (née McKechnie) at Camberwell Register Office, followed by a formal ceremony held at Central Synagogue, Hallam Street, as an observance of Jewish religious tradition. Whether there was disapproval by the family, this is not known. The family relocated from Camberwell to Hackney later that year. The marriage to Elsie produced two children (Olive and Maurice, born 1919 and 1932 (died 2000 and 2020) respectively). He emigrated to Australia in 1927.

The family settled in Moonee Ponds, Melbourne, where Smith's standing in the Jewish community became high. There he joined the Essendon sub branch of the Returned and Services League of Australia (RSL). He was the President of the 1914 Imperial Reservists Association, Australia. In 1928, he was appointed manager of British International Pictures in Melbourne, and then worked for Dunlop Rubber Company. His final job was with the Civil Aviation Board at Essendon Airport. Appointed a Justice of the Peace in 1930, Smith tried politics as a candidate in the 1931 federal election for the United Australia Party, contesting the seat of Melbourne in the House of Representatives, and "seriously challenged the hitherto unassailable Dr Maloney".

He was honoured in 1937 with the award of a King George VI Coronation Medal

On 20 February 1940, he sent a letter, to apply to join the Second Australian Imperial Force. A Major Barrett replied, to advise there were presently no suitable vacancies, but if he could provide the particulars of his army service and age, for future guidance, it would be appreciated. He sent a response to the Major, dated 4 March 1940, a copy of which is with the family. He stated that his date of birth was 18 September 1890.

Smith died of coronary thrombosis on 10 September 1940. He was buried in the Jewish section of Fawkner Cemetery with full military honours. In September 2010, the 70th Anniversary of his death was commemorated at a graveside ceremony in Melbourne, Major-General Jeffrey Rosenfeld laid a wreath. Over 100 people were in attendance, including Ben Hirsh as President, VAJEX Australia, and Captain Rabbi Dovid Gutnick (son of Mordechai Gutnick).

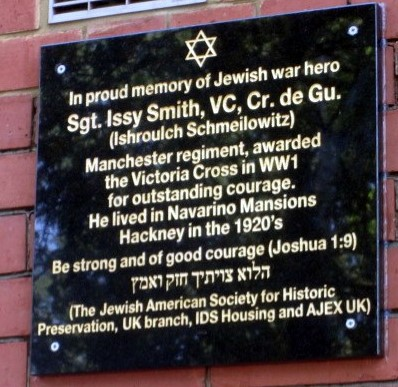
Issy Smith memorial

His medals were sold by his family in 1990, and auctioned 5 years later as part of a special collection of Medals to the Manchester Regiment, selling for £35,288 (US$75,000).

Following representations from the Association of Jewish Ex-Servicemen and Women, Communities Secretary Eric Pickles announced in September 2013 that the plan, to memorialise the 482 British-born First World War Victoria Cross medal holders by laying commemorative paving stones in their home towns, would be extended to the 145 born overseas include Smith. At the time of the announcement, it was believed he was born in Egypt. He is commemorated in Rope Walk Gardens, a few minutes walk away from the location of Berners Street School in Whitechapel.

On 23 June 2026, a historical interpretive marker was mounted on the building in Hackney, London where he lived after the war. The marker was donated by the Jewish American Society for Historic Preservation, IDS Housing and AJEX U.K.
