= Arthur Bagot =

Recipient of the George Cross

Arthur Gerald Bagot
- Born: 26 April 1888; Adelaide, South Australia
- Died: 12 November 1979 (aged 91); Perth, Western Australia
- Relatives: Lanoe Hawker (cousin)
- Military career
- Allegiance: United Kingdom; Australia
- Branch: Royal Naval Volunteer Reserve; Citizens Military Force
- Service years: 1916–1919; 1942–1945
- Rank: Lieutenant (RNVR); Captain (CMF)
- Conflicts: First World War; First Ostend Raid; Second World War
- Awards: George Cross; Distinguished Service Cross; Mentioned in Despatches

Arthur Gerald Bagot, GC, DSC (26 April 1888 – 12 November 1979) was an Australian naval officer and farmer. He was an exchange recipient of the George Cross, the highest civil decoration for heroism in the United Kingdom and formerly in the Commonwealth. In 1918, while serving as a lieutenant in the Royal Naval Volunteer Reserve during the First World War, Bagot and Lieutenant Robin Hoare battled flames to remove depth charges from ML 356 after its engine room had exploded. The pair were credited with preventing a further explosion and thus potential casualties, and were subsequently awarded the Albert Medal. In 1971, the British Government announced that the Albert Medal would be discontinued and living recipients would henceforth be regarded as holders of the George Cross. The change came into effect from 21 October, and living recipients were accordingly invited to exchange their medals; Bagot took up the offer.

== Early life and family ==
Arthur Gerald Bagot was born on 26 April 1888 in Adelaide, South Australia. He was the sixth of ten children to Christopher Michael Bagot, a sheep farmer and station owner, and Eleanor Mary (née Hawker). The family home was in Largs Bay. Bagot belonged to a distinguished family: he was a great-grandson of Admiral Edward Hawker and of pastoralist Charles Hervey Bagot, a grandson of settler and politician George Charles Hawker, and a first cousin of Lanoe Hawker, a flying ace and Victoria Cross recipient of the First World War. Bagot and his four brothers were educated at St Peter's College, Adelaide, before Arthur went on to Geelong Grammar School from 1903 to 1907. At Geelong Bagot was active in sporting and extracurricular activities. He participated in sprint, high jump, pole vault and long jump events at the United Public School Sports, an annual athletic competition between five prestigious Victorian public schools, and set a new record in the hurdles in 1907. Bagot also rose to sergeant in the local Australian Army Cadets unit, and was a school prefect in his final year. As Baggot's father had died in 1899, the remaining family moved to Canada in 1907 and settled near Vancouver, where they were to largely remain until 1925.

== First World War ==
In 1916 Bagot joined the Royal Naval Volunteer Reserve from Canada for service in the First World War. Commissioned as a temporary sub-lieutenant on 10 September, he embarked for the United Kingdom that month and, on arrival, was appointed to the Motor Launch Division of the Dover Patrol. Bagot spent two years in Motor Launches on mostly anti-submarine and defensive duties within the Dover fleet, which was tasked with defending the southern end of the English Channel between Dover and Dunkirk. He was attached as an additional officer to HMS Attentive from April 1917 for service aboard ML 283, and promoted temporary lieutenant on 10 September 1917.

On 12 April 1918, the engine room of ML 356 exploded at Dunkirk quay, and the forward petrol tanks burst into flames. Several of the launch's crew were blown overboard by the explosion, while the remainder were driven off by the fire. Flames soon began to issue forth from the cabin, and burning petrol spread on the surface of the water. As others proceeded to flee the scene, Bagot, along with Lieutenant Robin Hoare, realised the fire was threatening the aft petrol tanks and the depth charges located on board the launch. Jumping in a dinghy, the pair rowed out towards the blaze. On reaching the wreck, Bagot and Hoare removed the depth charges despite the flames; thus preventing any further explosion.

For their actions during the engagement, both Bagot and Hoare were awarded the Albert Medal. The announcement and accompanying citation for the award was published in the London Gazette on 20 August 1918, reading:

Admiralty, 20th August, 1918.

The KING has been graciously pleased to approve of the award of the Albert Medal for Gallantry in Saving Life at Sea to

Lieutenant-Commander Keith Robin Hoare, D.S.O., D.S.C., R.N.V.R., and Lieutenant Arthur Gerald Bagot, D.S.C., R.N.V.R.

The account of the services in respect of which the Decoration has been conferred is as follows: —

On the 12th April, 1918, an explosion took place in the engine-room of H.M. Motor Launch 356, and the forward tanks burst into flame. The Officer and some of the crew were blown overboard by the explosion, and the remainder were quickly driven aft by the flames, and were taken off in a skiff. By this time the flames were issuing from the cabin hatch aft, and there was much petrol burning on the surface of the water. It was then realised by the crews of adjacent vessels that the aft petrol tanks and the depth charge were being attacked by the fire, and might explode at any moment. At the moment when others were running away, Lieutenant Hoare and Sub-Lieutenant Bagot jumped into their dinghy, rowed to the wreck, got on board, and removed the depth charge, thereby preventing an explosion which might have caused serious loss of life amongst the crowd of English and French sailors on the quay.

Appointed second-in-command of Motor Launch 283, Bagot was in action at the First Ostend Raid on 23 April 1918. Throughout the operation, the launch conducted duties of rescuing officers and men from HMS Brilliant and Sirius. Praised for his "great coolness under fire" during the engagement, Bagot was awarded the Distinguished Service Cross. The notification of the award was published in a supplement to the London Gazette on 23 July 1918.

On 28 August 1918, Bagot was Mentioned in Despatches for "valuable services in action ... off the enemy coast". In March 1919, he was promoted to the substantive rank of lieutenant, which was made retrospective to 15 February 1918. Two of Bagot's elder brothers also served in the First World War: Christopher, a Boer War veteran, was an officer in the Canadian Expeditionary Force, while John rose to captain in the 13th Australian Light Horse Regiment and was Mentioned in Despatches.

== Later life ==
Following the conclusion of the war, Bagot re-settled in Canada for a few years. Returning to Australia, he took up a mixed farming property near Piawaning, Western Australia, during 1925. In 1938, Bagot married Noel Irene Harris. At the outbreak of the Second World War, Bagot enlisted in the Citizens Military Force on 25 April 1942. Posted to the 9th Battalion, Volunteer Defence Corps, he served in Australia with the unit until his discharge on 15 October 1945, with the rank of captain.

On retiring, Bagot and his wife moved to Perth in 1962. In 1971, owing to the decline in status and significance of the Albert Medal, the British Government announced that the decoration would be abolished and living recipients would henceforth be regarded as holders of the George Cross. The change came into effect from 21 October, and living recipients were accordingly invited to exchange their medals. All six Australian Albert Medal recipients living at the time opted to accept the offer, (Note: The five others were Jack Chalmers, Stanley Gibbs, Robert Kavanaugh, William McAloney and Dick Richards.) and were invited to attend an investiture ceremony at Buckingham Palace to receive their new insignia. Bagot was not fit enough to travel to London, and requested the medal be forwarded to him by registered mail. The medal was subsequently sent to the Governor of Western Australia, who presented it to Bagot on 26 November 1972.

Aged 91, Bagot died on 12 November 1979; his wife had predeceased him by seven months.

== See also ==
For a chart of notable Australian Bagot family members, see Charles Hervey Bagot.

== Bibliography ==
- Bacon, Sir Reginald (1919). The Dover Patrol, 1915–1917. Vol. 1. New York, United States: George H. Doran Company. OCLC 1136826.
- Brazier, Kevin (2012). The Complete George Cross: A Full Chronological Record of All George Cross Holders. Barnsley, United Kingdom: Pen & Sword Military. ISBN 978-1-84884-287-8.
- Hebblethwaite, Marion (2005). One Step Further: Those Whose Gallantry Was Rewarded with the George Cross. Vol. 2: Book B. Witney, United Kingdom: Chamoleon HH Publishing. ISBN 978-0-9546917-3-8.
- Price, John (2015). Everyday Heroism: Victorian Constructions of the Heroic Civilian. London, United Kingdom: Bloomsbury Academic. ISBN 978-1-4742-4795-5.
- Staunton, Anthony (2005). Victoria Cross: Australia's Finest and the Battles they Fought. Prahran, Australia: Hardie Grant Books. ISBN 1-74066-288-1.
- Wright, Christopher; Anderson, Glenda, eds. (2013). The First World War, 1914–1918. The Victoria Cross and the George Cross: The Complete History. Vol. 2. York, United Kingdom: Methuen & Co. ISBN 978-0-413-77217-6.
