= Ayaiga =

Ayaigar, AM
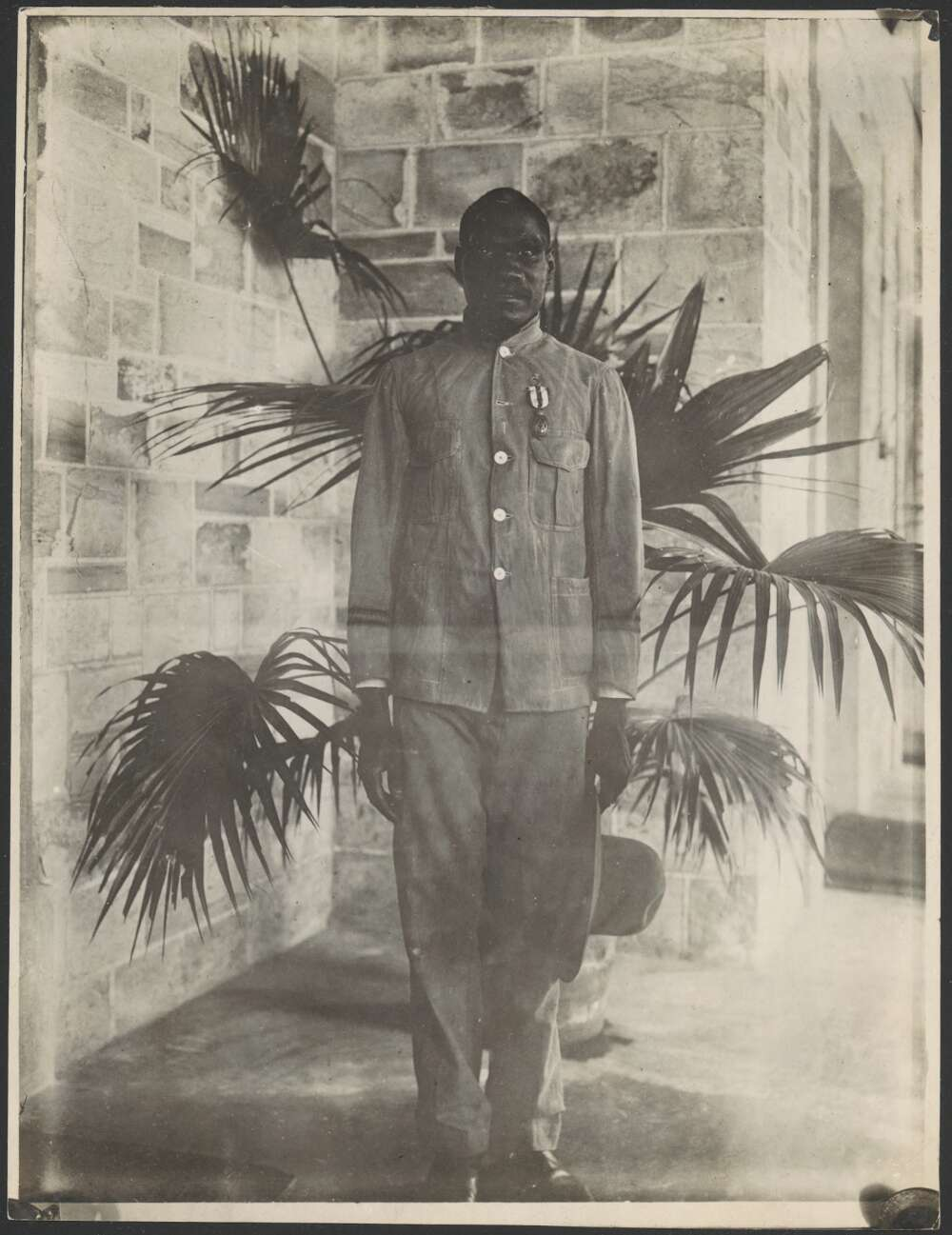
- Ayaigar

Personal details
- Born: c.1882 Roper River region
- Died: 21 June 1954 (aged 72)
- Occupation: Tracker and stockman

Ayaiga, AM, also known as Ayaigar, Aya-I-Ga, Neighbour or Nipper (c.1882 - 21 June 1954) was a police tracker and stockman in the Northern Territory of Australia. He was the first Indigenous person to be a recipient of a medal for gallantry in Australia, for saving a policeman from drowning.

== Biography ==
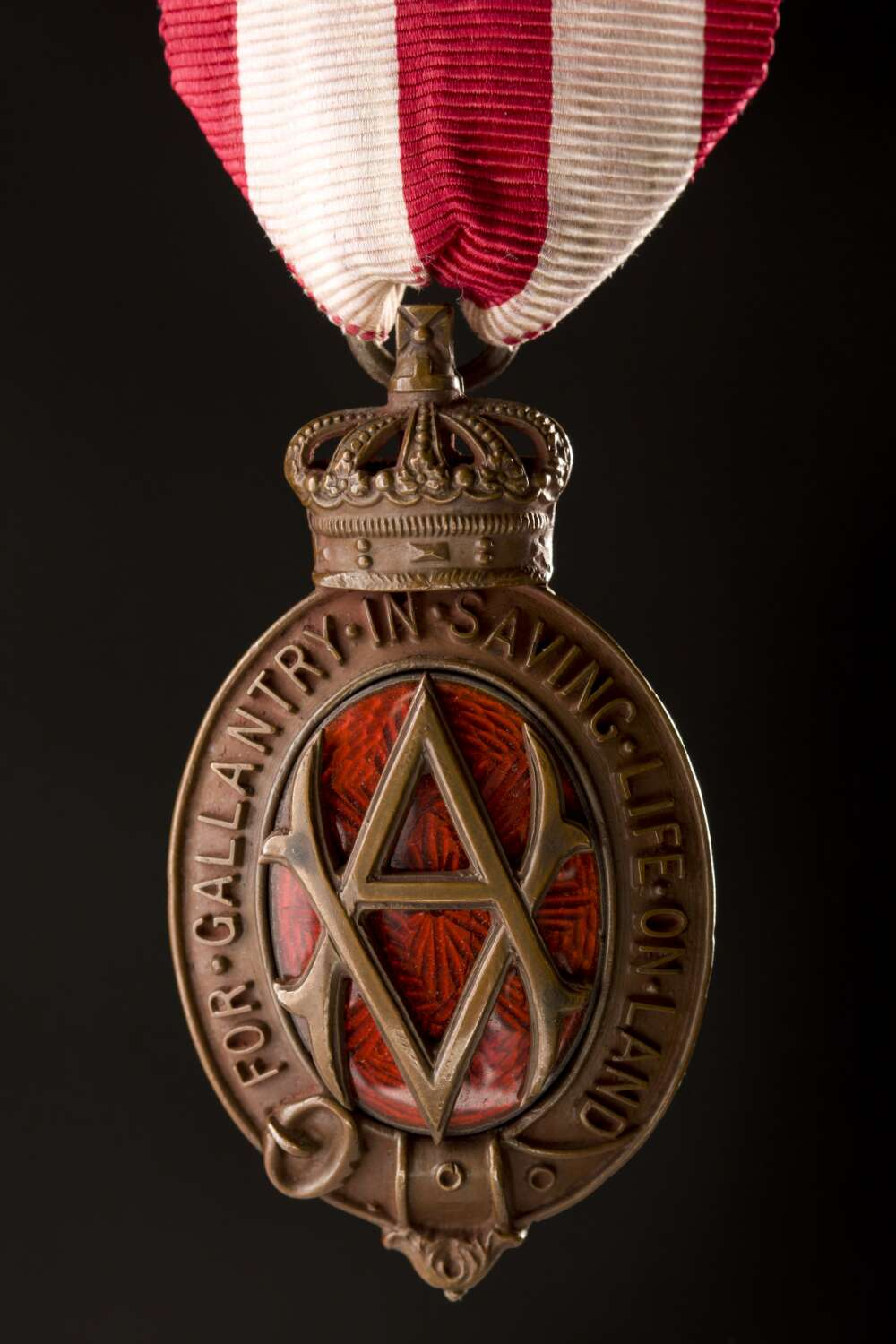
Ayaigar's Albert Medal for Lifesaving

Ayaiga was of the Alawa language group in the Roper River region. He worked as a police tracker at Roper Bar Police Station and as a stockman at Nutwood Downs and Hodgson Downs stations.

In 1911, Ayaiga saved the life of Mounted Police Constable William Johns during a river crossing. Ayaiga and three other men had been arrested for cattle stealing and was being transported in neck chains by Constable Johns. While attempting to cross the Wilton River, Johns' horse overturned kicking him in the head and knocking him unconscious. Despite the neck chain, Ayaiga quickly rescued Johns, dragging him to safety. Ayaiga then borrowed Johns' horse and rode to Hodgson Downs Station to request help. He was not convicted of cattle stealing. Then on 16 February 1912, he was awarded the Albert Medal for Lifesaving by King George V at Government House, making him the first Indigenous Australian awarded a medal for gallantry. (Note: Some sources indicate he also won a medal from the Royal Humane Society medal. There are no other reputable sources to support this.) He was not permitted to keep the medal, which was kept for him by the government to wear on special occasions.

He wore the medal in February 1915, while on trial for murder. He was acquitted.

In 1940, he ferried supplies and rescued people stranded by the flooded Roper River.

Constable Johns' grandson, sculptor Greg Johns, created a sculpture inspired by Ayaiga's story. It is on display at Northern Territory Library. Another of Johns' grandsons is ABC sports broadcaster Charlie King.

His medal is held at the National Library of Australia. A replica is on display at the Northern Territory Library.
