= Annie Praed =

20th-century Australian dentist

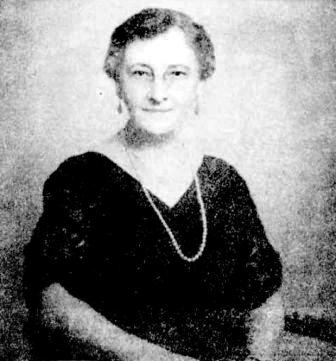
- Born: England
- Education: University of Sydney
- Medical career
- Profession: Dentist
- Field: Prosthodontics
- Institutions: United Dental Hospital of Sydney

Annie Praed (1873? - 26 December 1948) was one of the first two women to graduate from the University of Sydney. She was awarded a Licence in Dental Surgery in 1904 and a Bachelor of Dental Surgery in 1906. In 1938 Praed was the first woman in Australia to graduate with a Doctor of Dental Science at the same university.

== Early life ==
Praed was born in England. Mystery surrounds her early life until 1886, when she was approximately 14 years old and recorded as entering the household of Henry Burton-Bradley, a Sydney solicitor, as a servant. Burton-Bradley is thought to have funded Praed's early education at the Lotaville private school in Randwick.

== Career ==
After obtaining her dental qualification, Praed started a dental practice with Margaret Barnes, the other early woman dentistry graduate at the University of Sydney. In 1914, Praed represented the University of Sydney's undergraduate class in London at the International Dental Congress. Upon her return, Praed established a sole practice and developed a speciality in prosthodontics. She held honorary positions at the United Dental Hospital of Sydney, and was a founding member of the Dental Health Education Committee of the Australian Dental Association, becoming chairwoman in 1940.

== Death ==
Praed died on 26 December 1948 at Darling Point, New South Wales leaving no known relations. Praed was especially encouraging to young women dentistry students in her time; her legacy continues to inspire even after her death.
