= Arturo Fanconi =

- Born: 28 March 1906; Tonbridge, Kent, England
- Died: 28 June 1944 (aged 38); Quineville, Normandy, France
- Burial place: Bayeux War Cemetery
- Military career
- Allegiance: United Kingdom
- Branch: Royal Navy
- Service years: 1943-1944
- Nickname: Arthur
- Service number: C/MX 554517
- Awards: Albert Medal in Gold

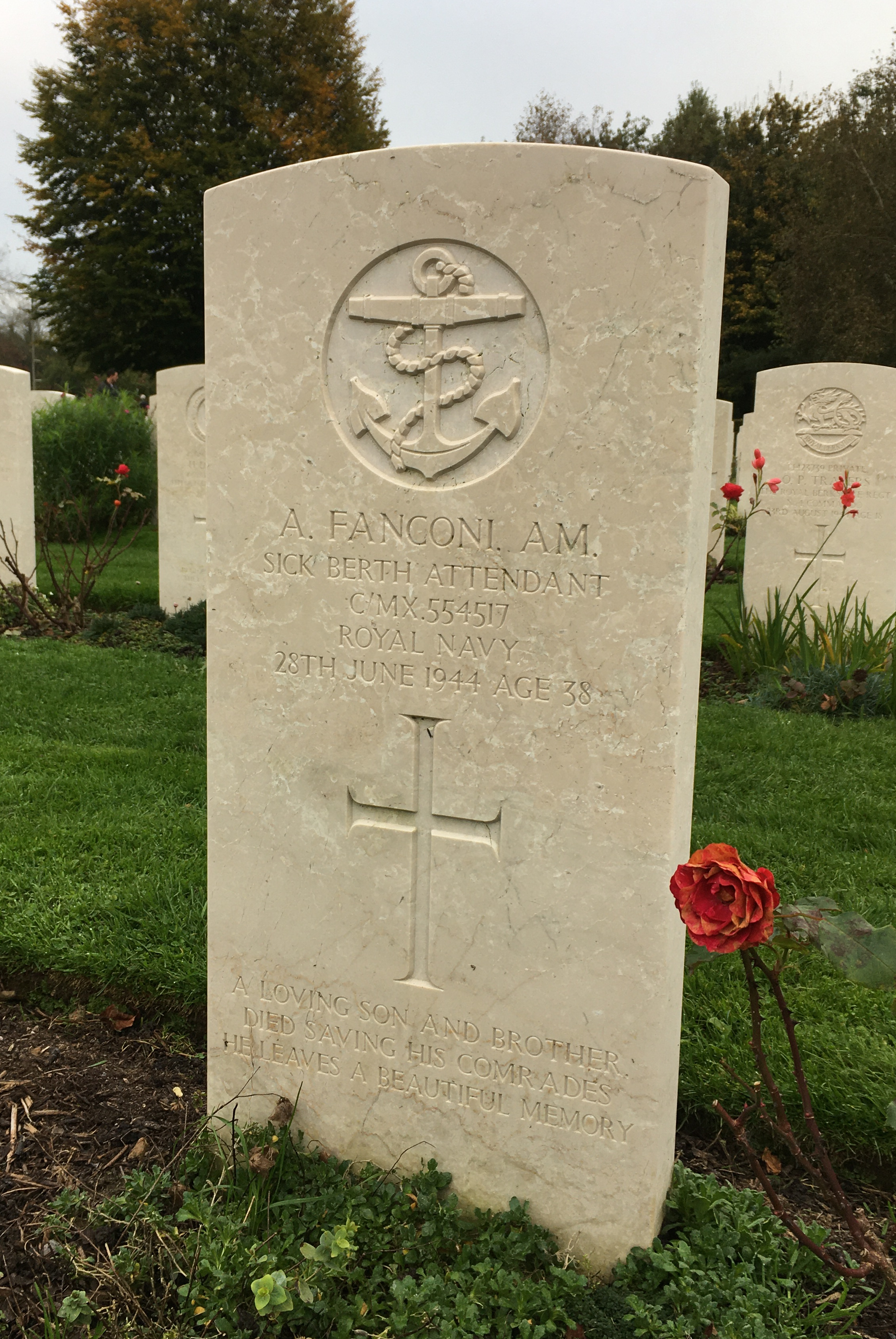
Fanconi's grave stone

Arturo "Arthur" Fanconi, AM (28 March 1906 – 28 June 1944) was a Swiss confectioner who was posthumously awarded the Albert Medal for Lifesaving (equivalent to the George Cross) after saving lives in a minefield while acting as a Royal Navy sick berth attendant.

== Biography ==
Fanconi was born on 28 March 1906 in Tonbridge, Kent, England, to Giulio Fanconi and Anna Fanconi (née Shumacher). He was a second generation Swiss immigrant via his parents, who were from Poschiavo, Grisons, Switzerland. He grew up in Ilminster, Somerset, where his parents ran a café. He worked with his family as a confectioner and pastry chef before the Second World War. He never married.

As a Swiss national and due to his occupation, he was exempt from conscription. However, in 1943, he volunteered for the medical branch of the Royal Navy. At the time of his death, Fanconi was attached to HMS Odyssey. This was not a ship but a stone frigate associated with Combined Operations. On D-Day (6 June 1944), he was present at Utah Beach where United States' troops landed. He was serving as the sick berth attendant to a Navy mobile radar unit that operated on the beach itself.

=== Albert Medal and death ===
On 28 June 1944, Fanconi was killed in action while providing medical aid to American troops caught in a minefield in Quineville, Normandy. In May 1945, he was posthumously awarded the Albert Medal for Lifesaving in Gold for saving the lives of two injured men, before being fatally injured while in an attempting to save a third. He was the final person to be awarded the Albert Medal in Gold before it was subsumed into the George Cross in 1971. He is buried in Bayeux war cemetery.

For gallantry in saving life:

The Albert Medal in Gold (Posthumous).
Sick Berth Attendant Arturo FANCONI, C/MX. 554517.

On 28th June, 1944, Fanconi was summoned to help men wounded by mines at Quineville in Normandy. He at once ran almost half a mile and went through what later proved to be a field of anti-personnel mines to reach them.

He applied tourniquets and bandages; then, with help, carried two patients out of the drive which was the scene of the incident. This was a tiring and difficult task as it entailed hugging a wall all the way. Fanconi was on the more dangerous side throughout.

While the rescue party were considering how best to help a third man who lay some distance within the minefield, another mine burst beneath the rubble on which they stood. This killed one helper and wounded Fanconi and another. Despite this, Fanconi tried to collect his scattered medical kit and to help his comrade. He had to crawl to do so, and was in great pain.

In his attempt, he exploded a further mine which blew off one of his feet. The explosion hurled him into the air, and when he fell he set off a third mine which severed his other foot. A Corporal made every effort to help him, but the kit was now of little use and Fanconi could not be saved.

All who had witnessed his selfless courage, his speed and skill in giving aid to others, all the while exposing himself to immediate danger, were inspired by his great example.

— The London Gazette citation, 11 May 1945

The medal was brought to the Antiques Roadshow in 2024, and was valued at between £20,000 and £25,000.
