= Albert Medal for Lifesaving =

British medal for saving a life

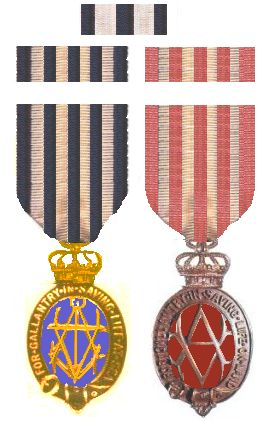
- The Albert Medals in Gold (sea - blue and land red)
- Type: Decoration
- Awarded for: Saving life
- Presented by: monarch or monarch's representative
- Eligibility: United Kingdom and British Empire/Commonwealth military and civilians
- Post-nominals: AM
- Status: Revoked with effect from 21 October 1971; living recipients on that date deemed to have been awarded the George Cross.
- Established: 7 March 1866

Highlights
- Total: Gold award (sea) 25; Bronze award (sea) 216; Gold medal (land) 45; Bronze award (land) 282
- Albert Medal 1st Class (Land) Albert Medal 1st Class (Sea) Albert Medal 2nd Class (Land) Albert Medal 2nd Class (Sea)

Precedence
- Next (higher): Order of St. John
- Equivalent: The Albert Medal (last appeared in the Order of Wear on Tuesday, 27 October 1964, p. 9121 since it was revoked in 1971 it no longer appears in the Order of Wear)
- Next (lower): Medals for Gallantry and Distinguished Service

The Albert Medal was a British decoration instituted to recognize the saving or endeavouring to save the lives of others. It existed from 1866 until 1971.

The Albert Medal was first instituted by a royal warrant on 7 March 1866. It was named in memory of Prince Albert and originally was awarded to recognize saving life at sea. The original medal had a blue ribbon 5/8" (16 mm) wide with two white stripes.

The first recipient of the medal, the only recipient under the 1866 warrant, was Samuel Popplestone, a tenant farmer, who on 23 March 1866 helped to rescue four men after the cargo ship Spirit of the Ocean lost its battle with force eleven gales and was torn apart as it was swept onto the notorious Start Point rocks in Devon. Witnessing the accident, Popplestone paused only to raise the alarm before setting off alone for the wreck, armed with just a small coil of rope. He clambered out onto the rocks and although swept off several times, he eventually managed to lift four men out of the water and drag them up the cliff to safety. As the story of Popplestone's bravery became known through the press, he was hailed as a hero and as a result of his heroism he became the first recipient of the new award for civilian gallantry.

A further royal warrant in 1867 created two classes of Albert Medal, the first in gold and bronze and the second in bronze, both enamelled in blue, and the ribbon of the first class changed to 1 3/8" (35 mm) wide with four white stripes. The medal was made of gold (although early examples are gold and bronze), which was enameled blue.

In 1877, the medal was extended to cover saving life on land and from this point there are two medals with different inscriptions to depict which they were awarded for. The land version was enamelled in red, with a red ribbon. There were miniatures of all four types (two classes each for sea and land, with the gold awards believed to be gilt).

The titles of the medals changed in 1917, the gold "Albert Medal, first class" becoming the "Albert Medal in gold" and the bronze "Albert Medal, second class" being known as just the "Albert Medal".

The event that led to the introduction of the Albert Medal for Gallantry on Land was the Tynewydd Colliery disaster which occurred on 11 April 1877. In many ways, although it was tragic the disaster at Tynewydd was, by the standards of the time when single mining accidents often claimed hundreds of lives, relatively unremarkable. However, as the enthralling saga of the determined, dangerous and stoic rescue of the surviving colliers was dramatically and episodically reported in the press it captured the imagination of the public and MPs. Consequently, released from Windsor Castle on 25 April 1877, it was announced that "the Albert Medal, hitherto only bestowed for gallantry in saving life at sea, shall be extended for similar actions on land, and that the first medals struck for this purpose shall be conferred on the heroic rescuers of the Welsh miners".

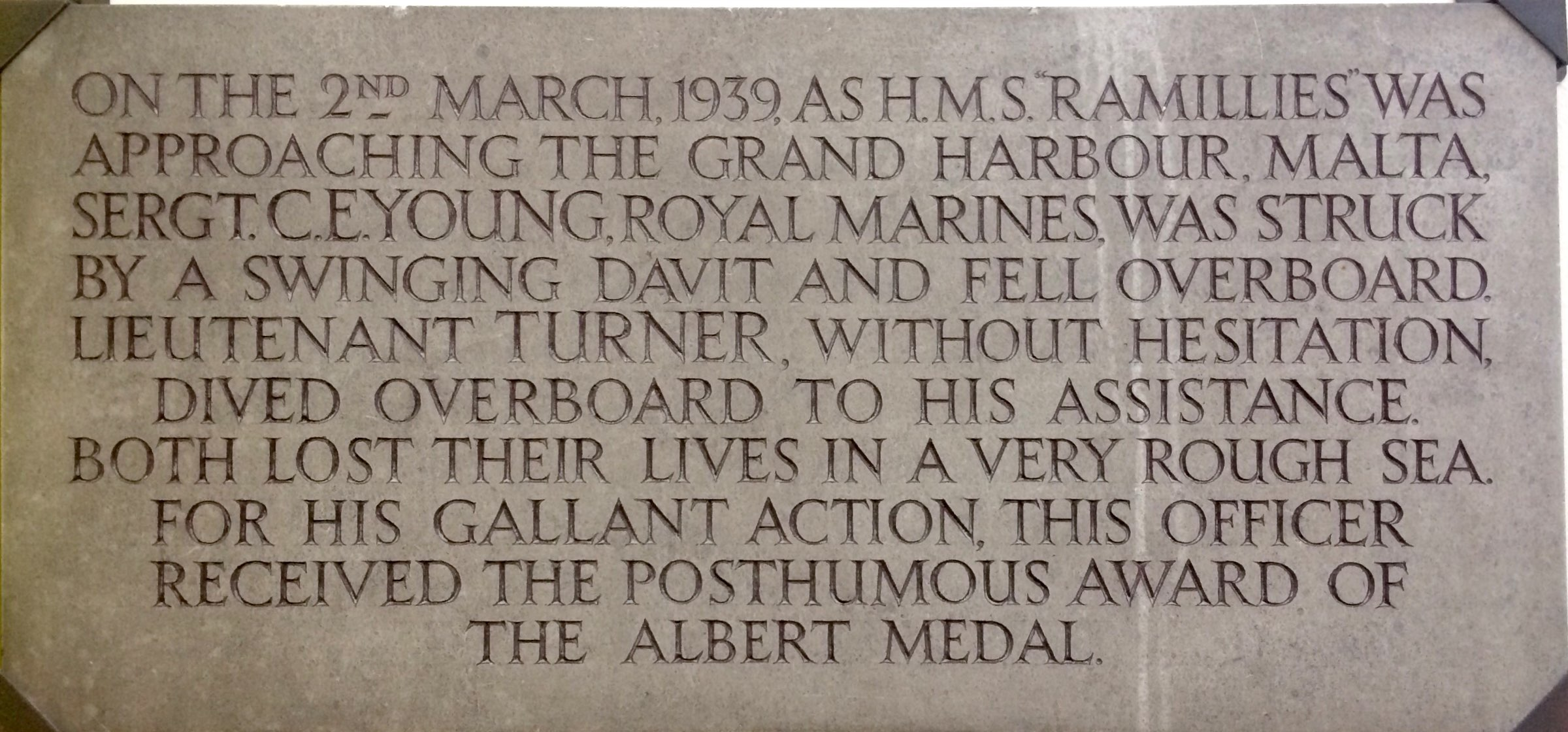
Memorial plaque commemorating Lieutenant Turner, Royal Marines, who received the posthumous award of the Albert Medal after, without hesitation, diving overboard to the assistance of Sergeant G. E. Young on 2 March 1939. Both lost their lives in a very rough sea.

The Albert Medal in gold was last awarded in 1945. The Albert Medal royal warrant was not amended to reflect decisions in the late 1940s to cease awarding the Albert Medal in gold and to only award the Albert Medal (in bronze) posthumously. In 1971, the Albert Medal was revoked (along with the Edward Medal) and all living recipients as at 21 October 1971, were deemed holders of the George Cross. Although all surviving recipients were deemed George Cross holders, they had the option of whether to exchange their insignia.

Aya-I-Ga, Neighbour or Nipper (c.1882 – 21 June 1954) was a police tracker and stockman in the Northern Territory of Australia. He is the first Indigenous Australian to win a medal for gallantry, for saving a policeman from drowning in 1911.

The last two awards were promulgated in the London Gazette of 31 March 1970, to the late First Officer Geoffrey Clifford Bye of Boolaroo, New South Wales, Australia, and on 11 August 1970 to the late Kenneth Owen McIntyre of Fairy Meadow, New South Wales, Australia.

== Awards made ==
Gold award (sea)	25 (plus one for the Board of Trade)
Bronze award (sea)	216
Gold medal (land)	45
Bronze award (land)	282

== Notable recipients ==
- Arturo Fanconi (1945)
- John Leslie Urquhart (1905)
