= Blacktown Native Institution Site =

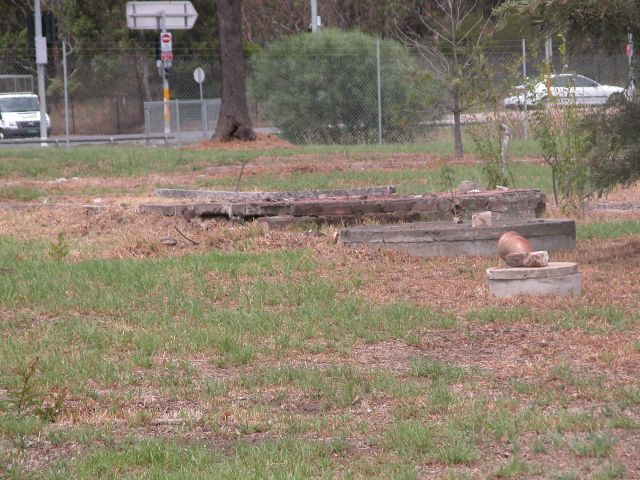
- Remains of a former structure, south-east corner of the site

- Location within New South Wales Location within Australia
- 33.7314°S 150.8461°E
- Location: Richmond Road, Oakhurst, City of Blacktown, New South Wales, Australia

History
- Built: 1822–

Site notes
- Owner: Dharug nation of Aboriginal Australians

New South Wales Heritage Register
- Official name: Blacktown Native Institution; Black Town Institute; Lloydhurst; Epping; Epping Forest
- Type: State heritage (archaeological-terrestrial)
- Designated: 18 November 2011
- Reference no.: 1866
- Type: Historic site
- Category: Aboriginal

The Blacktown Native Institution Site is the heritage-listed site of a former residential school for Aboriginal and Māori children in the City of Blacktown, part of the Greater Sydney metropolitan area in Australia, built from 1822. The site is located at Richmond Road, Oakhurst, New South Wales.

The school, which previously operated in Parramatta, has also been called the Parramatta Native Institution and the Blacktown Institution. After the school closed, the Blacktown site was known as Lloydhurst, Epping and Epping Forest. The property was added to the New South Wales State Heritage Register on 18 November 2011.

== History ==
The history of the Blacktown Native Institution is closely tied to the events of the early colonial period in New South Wales. Following colonisation by the British from 1788, a complex process of negotiation commenced between the regions' Indigenous inhabitants and the colonists. The outcomes of early cross-cultural engagement were shaped by a range of official and religious interests and so the establishment of the Blacktown Native Institution should be understood in the context of this period and the contemporary European racial attitudes and policies of that time.

When Lachlan Macquarie took up the position of Governor in 1809 he was instructed to facilitate that British subjects live in 'amity and kindness' with Aboriginal people. The colonial head of the Church of England, Samuel Marsden, had also been advised by the London Missionary Society in 1810, that he should "contribute to the Civilisation of the Heathen and thus prepare them for the reception of moral and religious instruction".

The proposal to establish a school for Aboriginal children was made amid growing conflict between settlers and the local Aboriginal people dispossessed of their yam farming lands along the Hawkesbury River. Farmers were competing directly with the Indigenous inhabitants, prompting violence and armed resistance, which only diminished with the death of Koori leader Pemulwuy in 1802. The arrival of drought in 1814 exacerbated the conflict, and in April 1816 Macquarie ordered military expeditions into Gandangarra land along the Nepean River.

=== Parramatta Native Institution ===
It was in the context of this conflict that in April 1814 William Shelley, a trader and former missionary of the London Missionary Society, wrote to Governor Macquarie with a proposal for educating Aboriginal children. Shelley stressed the need for education in useful skills, as a group rather than as individuals, for their eventual marriage, and for constant religious supervision. Macquarie eagerly seized upon the proposal and commenced establishment of a "Black Native Institution of NSW" at Parramatta. In December 1814 Macquarie held a public conference of local Aboriginal people to inform them of the institution and its purpose, and the first Aboriginal children were given into the school's care. Parents were told that they were not to remove their children from the Institution but that they could assemble every year on 28 December and be allowed to see their children. At this conference Macquarie also announced his intention to make grants of land to Aboriginal farmers.

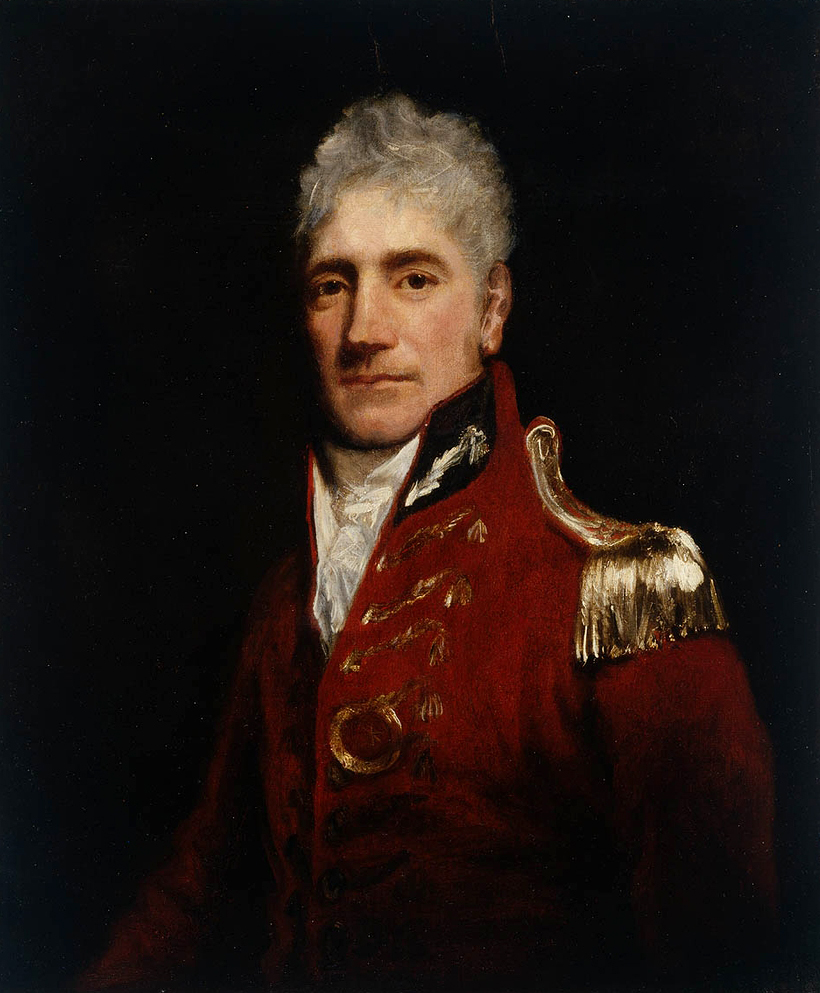
Governor Macquarie established the institution

Macquarie obtained a house in Parramatta, established Shelley as a manager, and on 10 December 1814 gazetted the rules and regulations for the Native Institution. The Parramatta Institution opened on 18 January 1815 taking four pupils initially, but that figure grew after another four children were captured during a punitive expedition between May and June 1816. The addition of several other children, as well as two recorded absconders, brought the total number of children to 13 by 9 September 1816. William and Elizabeth Shelley provided the instruction.

More children came to be educated at the Parramatta Institution over the coming years, with the institution's enrolment reaching more than 20 students at some times. During these years the institution continued to hold an annual public conference at which the local Aboriginal people could gather and reunite with their children in the institution. Macquarie concurrently made the first land grant to Aboriginal people, granting 30 acres to Colebee and Nurragingy on Richmond Road in 1816. The settlement on and around the land grant flourished and by the 1820s it had become known as the "Black Town".

Maria Cook, who later became an early Dharug and Aboriginal landowner, was one pupil. The achievement of an Aboriginal girl, aged 14, believed to be Cook, winning first prize in a New South Wales examination ahead of approximately 120 other students was reported in the Sydney Gazette on 17 April 1819. Her teachers reported her to be well ahead of the other students, with an early grasp on the English language and above-average educational performance.

In his 1819 book on Australia, William Charles Wentworth wrote that "by the last accounts from the colony, it contained eighteen native children, who had been voluntarily placed there by their parents, and were making equal progress in their studies with European children of the same age."

=== Establishment at Blacktown ===
In 1823 the institution was moved by Governor Brisbane (who succeeded Macquarie as governor on 1 December 1821) to land adjoining the new settlement along Richmond Road at Black Town. While the Parramatta phase of the school was considered by settlers as a success, primarily because the students had acquired European skills, the Blacktown stage, by contrast, was viewed by Europeans as a failure.

The Blacktown Native Institution operated from 1823 to 1829 under the direction of the Church Missionary Society (CMS). Brisbane appointed Samuel Marsden of the CMS as the school committee's chairman, while the day-to-day running of the school was overseen by George and Martha Clarke. The Clarkes were CMS missionaries originally destined for New Zealand, but they remained in New South Wales after they were appointed to the settlement by Marsden. The Clarkes took up their position at the Blacktown Native Institution on New Years Day 1823, when the children were transferred from the care of Mrs Shelley of the Parramatta Institution.

During this early period of establishment, the Blacktown Institution housed up to 14 pupils with only a few sheds and a small timber hut in which the Clarkes lived. A more substantial building would not be constructed for another six months. The students dug gardens and planted flowers and on Sundays Clarke acted as chaplain for the settlement and local convict labourers.

From 1821 to 1823 government spending on the institution increased sharply, covering the building program (commenced on the 26 April 1822) and the purchase of Sylvanus Williams' 12 hectares of farming land north across Richmond Road from the institution. In 1823 an assistant school teacher, John Harper, was also appointed. When construction was completed, the institution house was two-stories, with four bedrooms upstairs, two large rooms and four small bedrooms downstairs and two outside rooms (with a verandah in front and at each end). There was also a separate kitchen, stable and coach house and a well may have been sunk. In February 1824, the Clarkes left the institution, resuming their trip to New Zealand, presumably leaving the children in the care of John Harper.

In early 1824 the administration of the Native Institution was reorganised following Brisbane's dismissal of the committee. Brisbane placed the institution under the control of his Methodist protegee William Walker who retained all the female students while the boys were transferred to Robert Cartwright at Liverpool. The population of the settlement increased somewhat after the arrival of Walker in 1824 but the settlement appears to have been unstable during this period, perhaps due to the proximity of traditional Aboriginal people and convicts living nearby. At the end of 1824 Brisbane closed the institution, amalgamating native and orphan schools and moving the few remaining girls with Walker to his new post at the Female Orphan School.

During 1825 the institution was abandoned. In May 1825, Archdeacon Thomas Hobbes Scott announced that he had received instruction to re-open the Blacktown institution and in June he proposed that the schoolhouse be repaired and that in the meantime Frederick Wilkinson take up residence as manager of a private boarding house for European children. This proposal, including repairs to the house, was carried out during 1826 and in January 1827 Wilkinson, along with his family and a number of boarders, removed to Parramatta, having been in residence for one year.

These instructions can be viewed within the context of a change in policy, with Governor Darling being instructed to seek advice from Church of England Archdeacon Scott regarding the conversion of Aboriginal people. Because of its relative remoteness, Blacktown was seen as an appropriate location for such a task and so CMS missionary Hall, and his wife were charged with re-opening the school. Black children from the various male and female orphanages were taken there and at Marsden's persuasion, Maori children were also taken there from his Parramatta school. Hall was directed by Scott to instruct the children in "the Common Elements of Education" and religious instruction, but also to teach the boys carpentry and the girls plain needlework and spinning.

In October 1826 Hall received six girls from the Female Orphan Institution, adding to the three Maori children who were already acting as servants to his family. Between December 1826 and January 1827 Hall also received boys from Cartwright's Male Orphan Institution, including Billy, probably the son of Nurragingy. Additional children arrived and by late 1827 the school housed 17 Aboriginal and five Maori pupils, although this was still well below the building's capacity of 60 students.

The documented records relating to this period of the institution's operation suggest that there was often difficulty acquiring and sustaining student enrolments at the institution, the children frequently absconded or were removed by their parents. The rebellion of the children against the strictures of their educators was also an ongoing problem. Added to these issues was the rising cost of the institution's operation, which had gone from being 17 pounds per head in 1820 to around 28 pounds per head under Hall's supervision. It was in light of these difficulties that early in 1829 the recommendation was made for the institution to be closed and the children moved to Cartwright at Liverpool. Cartwright resigned from the Male Orphan School and took charge of ten "Native" children in April for the sum of 250 pounds per annum. Hall subsequently purchased Cartwright's 500 acres at the Black Town in April 1829 and constructed a cottage where his family ran a small boarding school. In 1831, Hall reported that the Native Institution building was deteriorating.

=== Private ownership after closure ===
In 1832 Governor Bourke requested a report from the Surveyor-General on the extent and status of the institution land and buildings. On 2 November 1833 the assistant-surveyor Felton Matthews surveyed the site of the 'Crown Reserve and Schoolhouse at Blacktown'; his sketch marks the location of the house, kitchens, stable, gardens and creek, still known at that time as "Gidley Chain of Ponds". In 1833 the Native Institution Reserve (including its buildings) was advertised for sale, and subsequently sold at auction to William Bell, a lieutenant on half-pay, who renamed the property "Epping" or "Epping Forest". Bell died in 1843 and his daughter Maria who inherited the property, died in 1876.

Sydney Burdekin bought the property as his country residence in September 1877, renaming it "Lloydhurst". Burdekin was a prominent figure within colonial society and entertained lavishly at the residence. He made additions to the original Native Institution building, including a ballroom. After Burdekin's death in 1899, the family sold the property to Mr L.J. David in 1906. It passed to Robert Smith and then to merchant Harry Woolnough in 1910. The site was subdivided into small farm blocks and advertised for auction on 5 December 1914. It was bought by the Wardrop family in 1920 for 2,030 pounds. The old schoolhouse was destroyed by fire in 1924.

A fibro house was built over the ruins of the old schoolhouse and the property was used as a dairy farm until 1985, when the fibro house was demolished. The site was subsequently acquired by Landcom within a large tract of land obtained for housing development. While surrounding areas have been transformed through extensive residential development, the original 30-acre site has remained largely vacant until the present day.

=== Handback to traditional owners ===
In October 2018, a ceremony was held to formalise Landcom's hand over of ownership of the site to the Dharug people, the traditional owners of the land. The site is now maintained by the Dharug Strategic Management Group a living memorial to the stolen generations, marked by art installations produced in cooperation with local artists and the Museum of Contemporary Art Australia. The Dharug Strategic Management Group has plans to develop a permanent cultural centre at the site.

== Description ==
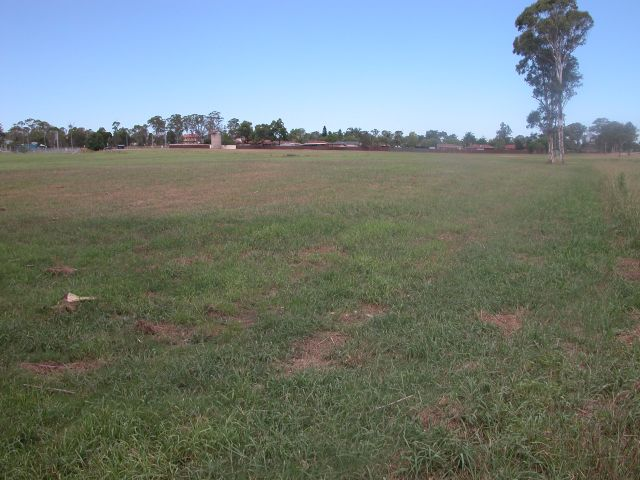
The institution is now mostly a vacant lot

The Blacktown Native Institution site is a rare site associated with early 19th Century missionary activity. The first such site was the Parramatta Native Institution established in 1815. The site Parramatta institution has been redeveloped. The second site of this type was the Blacktown Native Institution dating from 1823. Rev Threlkeld's mission at Lake Macquarie established in 1825 was the third and the fourth was the Wellington Valley Aboriginal Mission which was begun in 1831.

The site of the Blacktown Native Institution is today a largely vacant lot of land bounded by the residential subdivision of Hassall Grove to the west/southwest and arterial roads to the east and south. The site is predominantly cleared and is traversed in the north by Bells Creek, which has been modified and piped. Surface remains are visible only in the area of the main Native Institution building, where some remains do survive. The site retains little remnant original/indigenous vegetation, apart from some garden remains around the main house site.

=== Condition ===
As at 10 February 2005, The Blacktown Native Institution site can be divided into indicative zones of archaeological potential. The area of the schoolhouse and nearby service areas and outbuildings are considered to have high archaeological potential, while the old creek line, which is highly disturbed, may retain some aspects of archaeological potential. The balance of the site may contain workings, garden remains or rubbish dumps and is considered to have some archaeological potential.

An open campsite from the historic contact/settlement period was located in the north-west side of Bells Creek during an archaeological survey in 1981. The presence of this site is consistent with records that state that adult Aboriginal people were living near the schoolhouse. A more recent archaeological survey work failed to relocate this site.

The Blacktown Native Institution site has suffered considerable disturbance over its history however, the site does have the potential to contain archaeological relics and deposits associated with the Blacktown Native Institution.

=== Modifications and dates ===
The Blacktown Native Institution has suffered considerable disturbance through its history. The site was utilised as a working property in the Nineteenth and Twentieth Centuries. In 1924 the former Institution house was destroyed by fire. A fibro farm house replaced the old house and this in turn was demolished in 1985. The site was further disturbed through post-1985 activities which include clearance of vegetation, piping of the creek, construction of the sewer (the date of this construction is currently unknown) and the construction of an open drain running north to south through the site. These episodes of disturbance have significantly effected the physical intactness of the site; however, the site does retain archaeological potential and some integrity through its setting and the presence of visible surface remains.

== Heritage listing ==
The Blacktown Native Institution site is a site of State significance because of its combination of historical, social and archaeological values. The Blacktown Native Institution played a key role in the history of colonial assimilation policies and race relations. The site is notable for the range of associations it possesses with prominent colonial figures including: Governor Macquarie, Governor Brisbane, Samuel Marsden, William Walker and Sydney Burdekin.

The Blacktown Native Institution site is valued by the contemporary Aboriginal community and the wider Australian community as a landmark in the history of cross-cultural engagement in Australia. For Aboriginal people in particular, it represents a key historical site symbolising dispossession and child removal. The site is also important to the Sydney Maori community as an early tangible link with colonial history of trans-Tasman cultural relations and with the history of children removed by missionaries.

The Blacktown Native Institution is a rare site reflecting early 19th century missionary activity. The site has the potential to reveal evidence, that may not be available from other sources, about the lives of the children who lived at the school and the customs and management of the earliest Aboriginal school in the colony. The site also has the potential to contain archaeological evidence relating to later phases of land use, including the period the property was owned by Sydney Burdekin. In addition, the site may contain evidence of Aboriginal camps which may provide information about how Aboriginal people, accustomed to a traditional way of life, responded to the changes prompted by colonisation.

Blacktown Native Institution was listed on the New South Wales State Heritage Register on 18 November 2011 having satisfied the following criteria.

The place is important in demonstrating the course, or pattern, of cultural or natural history in New South Wales.

For Aboriginal and non-Aboriginal people the Blacktown Native Institution is an important landmark in the history of black and white relations in Australia. The institution, which operated between 1823 and 1829, reflects the commencement of the historical process of Aboriginal child removal, marking the Colonial Administration's attempts beginning with Governor Macquarie in 1814, to educate and to assimilate Aboriginal children into white society. More specifically, it reflects a colonial policy featuring a belief that Aboriginal children could be "civilised" through removal from their culture, and a policy of confining Aboriginal people within settlements remote from European society.

For the current Aboriginal community, the site provides a link with an early Aboriginal settlement, known from the 1820s as the "Black Town". This is where the first land grants were made to Aboriginal people (Colebee and Nurragingy) and farming allotments were taken up, representing the earliest attempts of Aboriginal people to engage with, and to establish their autonomy within, European society.

The Native Institution also represents Indigenous objectives and experiences between 1823 and 1829, including parents' refusal to accept separation from their children, the children's reluctance to conform with European strictures, their resistance to remaining within the institution and their experience of life within it.

The place has a strong or special association with a person, or group of persons, of importance of cultural or natural history of New South Wales's history.

The Blacktown Native Institution is notable for the range of associations it possesses with prominent colonial figures. The Blacktown Native Institution is strongly associated with Governor Lachlan Macquarie. Although the Blacktown Native Institution followed Macquarie's original Parramatta initiative, it reflects the outcomes of his policy towards indigenous people. The site is also associated with Governor Brisbane's attempts to develop colonial policy with respect to the indigenous inhabitants.

The site is associated with Rev Samuel Marsden and missionary William Walker. Marsden, a prominent figure in the early the colony, was appointed chairman of the Native Institution Committee by Governor Brisbane in December 1821. Marsden who had missionary connections with New Zealand was responsible for bringing Maori children to the school. William Walker protege of Governor Brisbane, and the first missionary to be instructed specifically to minister to the indigenous people of New South Wales, was appointed as manager of the institute in 1824.

The site of the Blacktown Native Institute is associated with the prominent and influential late nineteenth-century figure Sydney Burdekin, who purchased the property in 1877 for use as his country residence. Burdekin was a pastoralist and politician. He served almost continuously in the Legislative Assembly between 1880 and 1894 representing in succession Tamworth, East Sydney and Hawkesbury. Burdekin was also alderman of Sydney Municipal Council between 1883 and 1898 and Mayor of Sydney Municipal Council between January 1890 and April 1891.

The place has strong or special association with a particular community or cultural group in New South Wales for social, cultural or spiritual reasons.

The Blacktown Native Institute for the Aboriginal community is a key site symbolising dispossession, child removal and enduring links to the land. For some members of the Aboriginal community it represents a landmark in Aboriginal-European relations, symbolising the continuing need for reconciliation and understanding between blacks and whites.

The site is also important to the Sydney Maori community as an early tangible link with colonial history of trans-Tasman cultural relations and with the history of children removed by missionaries. The non-Aboriginal community of Blacktown value the place because of its association with important historical events, processes and individuals, and as the historical heart of Blacktown.

The place has potential to yield information that will contribute to an understanding of the cultural or natural history of New South Wales.

The Blacktown Native Institution site has high archaeological potential to reveal evidence, that may not be available from other sources, about of the lives of the children who lived at the school and the customs and management of the earliest Aboriginal school in the colony. The site also has the potential to contain archaeological evidence relating to later phases of land use, including the period the property was owned by Sydney Burdekin. In addition, the site may contain evidence of Aboriginal camps which may provide information about how Aboriginal people, accustomed to a traditional way of life, responded to the changes prompted by colonisation.

The place possesses uncommon, rare or endangered aspects of the cultural or natural history of New South Wales.

The Blacktown Native Institution is a rare site reflecting early 19th century missionary activity. The site may contain the earliest evidence of the Colonial Administration's attempts to Christianise and Europeanise Aboriginal children.
