= Yarramundi =

Chief of the Australian Indigenous Richmond tribe

- Born: c. 1760; Richmond, New South Wales
- Died: after 1818
- Known for: "Chief of the Richmond Tribe(s)"
- Children: Maria Lock, Colebee

Yarramundi (ca. 1760 – after 1818) was an Indigenous Australian called by Europeans "the chief of the Richmond Tribe" or "Tribes". He was a member of the Boorooberongal clan of the Darug people, and was a garadyi or "doctor".

Yarramundi and his father Gomebeeree met Governor Arthur Phillip on 14 April 1791, and this meeting is described by Watkin Tench (who spells his name Yellomundee) in his A Complete Account of the Settlement at Port Jackson, published in 1793. Yarramundi's daughter, Maria (born 1805) was the first Aboriginal child to be placed in the Native Institute at Parramatta, where she won the Yearly state Examinations ahead of 100 white children.

On 26 January 1824, she married convict Robert Lock. It was the first legal marriage between an Aboriginal and a non Aboriginal person in Australia. Yarramundi's son, Colebee, was the first Aboriginal person to receive a land grant. Following Colebee's death, Maria was granted his land at Blacktown and lived there until her death in 1878. She was buried in Prospect cemetery. At the time of her death, she held 60 acres (240,000 m^{2}) of land at Blacktown and 40 acres (160,000 m^{2}) at Liverpool (NSW). Liverpool council chamber is built on part of this grant.

Yarramundi's daughter's descendants still live in the area. Notably Bundeluk was an educator, actor, artist, public speaker and indigenous adviser / tour guide in the Blue Mountains of Australia.

== See also ==
- List of Indigenous Australian historical figures
