= Colebee (Boorooberongal) =

Notable Dharug man

Colebee (c.1800 – 1830) was a Boorooberongal man of the Dharug people, an Aboriginal Australian people from present-day New South Wales. Colebee and fellow Dharug man Nurragingy received land grants in recognition of their assistance in guiding British military forces in punitive expeditions against insurgent Gandangara and Darkinjung people in 1816.

== Early life ==
Colebee's father, Yarramundi, was "Chief of the Richmond Tribe". Colebee also had a sister, Maria Lock.

== Colebee and Nurragingy ==
Colebee was involved as an advisor in an early road construction project in the British colony of New South Wales, which was carried out by William Cox, who built the 163 km long road from Sydney to Bathurst from 18 July 1814 to 14 January 1815. This road marked the beginning of the development of the interior of Australia because it made it possible to overcome the Blue Mountains, which were previously considered insurmountable.

In 1816, during a period of heightened conflict between local Aboriginal people and the British colonists in the Hawkesbury and Nepean Wars, Governor Lachlan Macquarie employed several Indigenous men to act as guides for the military to track down and 'inflict exemplary and severe punishments on the mountain tribes' who had been raiding farms along the Hawkesbury and Nepean rivers. Colebee was one of these guides as was his kinsman Nurragingy (also known as Creek Jemmy).

Colebee accompanied a detachment of the 46th Regiment under Captain James Wallis which scoured the Appin region looking for the 'mountain tribes' or Gandangara people. On 17 April, Wallis led a dawn raid on a Gandangara camp which resulted in the Appin massacre, killing at least 14 Aboriginal people. It seems Colebee did not act as a guide during this particular punitive expedition, but he was given slop clothing, a blanket, some rations, liquor and tobacco as payment for his overall efforts.

In May, Colebee and Nurragingy were again called up to be guides for the British military, this time under Sergeant Robert Broadfoot leading 16 soldiers on a punitive expedition to capture or kill Gandangara people in the Warragamba River area. Although a large deserted Aboriginal camp was found, no casualties were recorded during this mission. Colebee received a week's rations, some tobacco and a blanket as payment.

In September, Colebee was assigned to another punitive expedition, this time organised by the prominent colonist and ex-soldier William Cox, to track down and 'utterly destroy' ten Aboriginal outlaws believed to have been hiding out around the Grose River. Colebee and twelve other Aboriginal guides led 55 armed men into the bush west of the Hawkesbury River. Although there is no mention of any casualties, the expedition resulted in the capture of six Darkinjung people.

Colebee and Nurragingy were given brass plaques, known as gorgets, from Governor Macquarie for aiding the colonists in the campaigns against the Gandangara. In December 1816, they received a grant of 30 acres (approx. 12 ha) of their own people's land from the British Crown as further reward for their assistance. These were the first land grants given to Aboriginal people in the area that became known as Black's Town.

Nurragingy's gorget was engraved with "Chief of the South Creek Tribe", while Colebee's was a smaller but similar brass plate. Nurragingy was the second Aboriginal man after Bungaree to receive such a token.

== Blacktown ==
In the 1830s, both Colebee and Nurragingy died - exact dates are not known - after which a dispute over inheritance ensued in court between Nurragingy's sons Bobby and Billy and Colebee's sister Maria Lock. The court awarded the land to Lock, a historically famous figure in Australia for being the first Aboriginal person to legally marry a white man, a British convict.

When she died in 1878, the land was divided among her nine children. The Lock family settled this land until the 1900s. It was only when this family was decimated by a series of diseases and epidemics that they were no longer able to meet their obligations, so Blacktown Council took over the payments and probably bought the area after the Second World War. Walter Lock unsuccessfully sued for the return of the land that had been given the name Blacktown. In mid-2011 it was announced that apartments were to be built on this site. The Darug Tribal Aboriginal Corporation reported cultural and historical concerns in August 2011, primarily citing the fact that there are burial sites of Aboriginal children there, and ensuring that it will be involved in future planning.

== Legacy ==
The suburb Colebee, based in the local government area of the City of Blacktown, is named after him.

== See also ==
- List of Indigenous Australian historical figures
