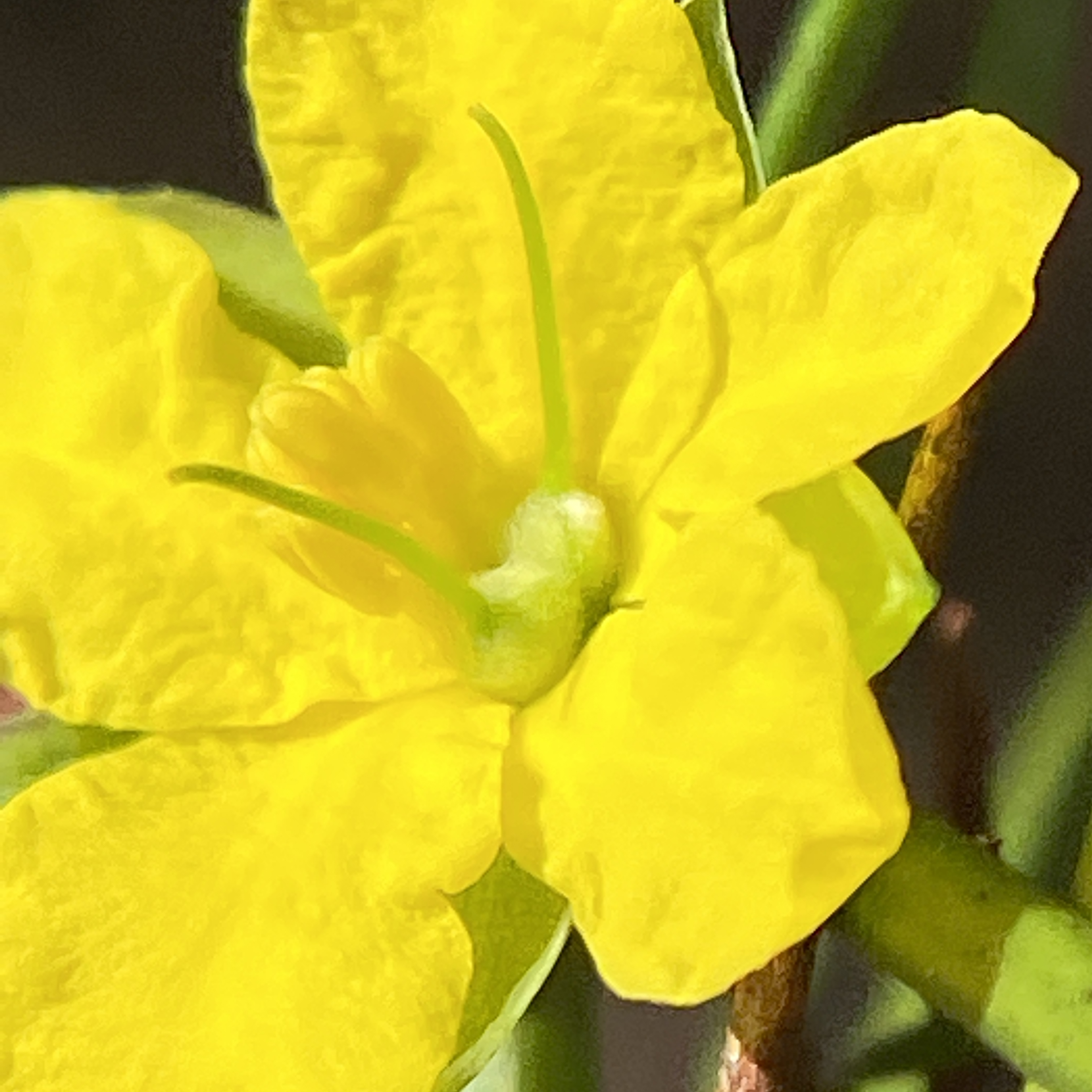

Scientific classification
- Kingdom: Plantae
- Clade: Embryophytes
- Clade: Tracheophytes
- Clade: Angiosperms
- Clade: Eudicots
- Order: Dilleniales
- Family: Dilleniaceae
- Genus: Hibbertia
- Species: H. sulcinervis

Binomial name
- Hibbertia sulcinervis Toelken

= Hibbertia sulcinervis =

Species of plant

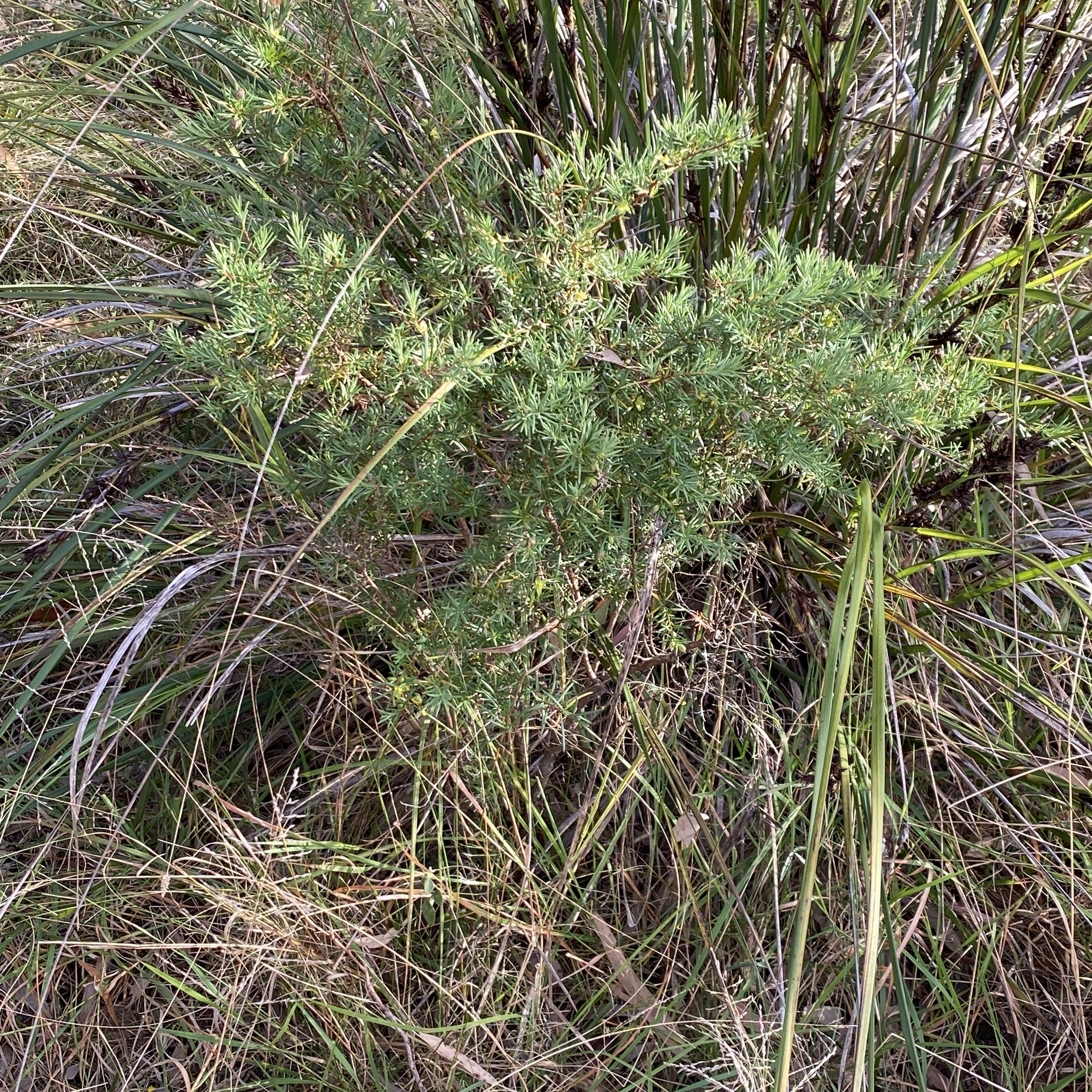
Habit near Yarramundi

Hibbertia sulcinervis is a species of flowering plant in the family Dilleniaceae and is endemic to the central coast of New South Wales. It is an erect shrub with linear leaves and yellow flowers with six or seven stamens grouped beside two carpels.

== Description ==
Hibbertia sulcinervis is an erect shrub that typically grows to a height of up to 60 cm (24 in) and has pronounced flanges on the base of the leaves. The leaves are linear, mostly 10–20 mm (0.39–0.79 in) long and 0.8–1.1 mm (0.031–0.043 in) wide on a petiole 0.8–1.6 mm (0.031–0.063 in) long. The flowers are arranged on the ends of branches or on short side-branches on a pedicel up to 2 mm (0.079 in) long with bracts 1.6–2.3 mm (0.063–0.091 in) long at the base but that fall off as the flower opens. The five sepals are joined at the base, the two outer sepals mostly 4.5–5.4 mm (0.18–0.21 in) long and 1.8–2.2 mm (0.071–0.087 in) wide, the inner lobes slightly broader. The petals are wedge-shaped, yellow, 4.2–5.8 mm (0.17–0.23 in) long and about 3 mm (0.12 in) wide with six or seven stamens arranged around two shortly-hairy carpels, each with four ovules. Flowering occurs from September to December.

== Taxonomy ==
Hibbertia sulcinervis was first formally described in 2012 by Hellmut R. Toelken in the Journal of the Adelaide Botanic Gardens from specimens collected by Roger Coveny near Nortons Basin in 1965. The specific epithet (sulcinervis) means "with grooved nerves", referring to the central leaf veins.

== Distribution ==
This hibbertia is only known from two collections, the most recent in 1965 from Nortons Basin on the Nepean River, and it may now be extinct.
