= Anthony Fernando =

Anthony Martin Fernando
- Pinned to Anthony Fernando's coat, in front of Australia House (1928) were scores of small, white, toy skeletons and he wore a placard proclaiming: "This is all Australia has left of my people."
- Born: 6 April 1864; Woolloomooloo, New South Wales
- Died: 9 January 1949 (aged 84); Ilford, England
- Other name: Anthony Martin
- Citizenship: British
- Occupations: Toy Maker, Political Activist
- Known for: Early Aboriginal Australian protests * firm, eloquent overseas campaigning against injustices perpetrated against his people; * petitioning the Pope * picketing Australia House in London * Court Cases & Speeches
- Website: http://adbonline.anu.edu.au/biogs/AS10160b.htm

Anthony Martin Fernando (6 April 1864 – 9 January 1949) was an early Aboriginal Australian toymaker and early political activist. He is mostly known for his three-year protest outside London's Australia House which ended with his arrest in 1928. During the protest, he wore a cloak decorated with white toy skeletons.

== Biography ==
Fernando was born in Woolloomooloo, New South Wales as a member of the Dharug nation. He spent most of his life in "self-imposed" exile, overseas, protesting and publicising the injustices inflicted upon himself, his people, and Aboriginal Australians generally:

...'his long grey beard damp with mist, his frail elderly frame wrapped in a large overcoat'. Pinned to his coat were scores of small, white, toy skeletons and he wore a placard proclaiming: 'This is all Australia has left of my people'

He died in the East London town of Ilford on 9 January 1949.

== On-line newspaper articles ==
- ""A JOKE." - Anthony Martin Fernando, an Australian aboriginal, had arrived at Berne seeking support for .. a certain district in North Australia .. being reserved for aborigines". The Brisbane Courier. 30 June 1921.
- ""NOT SAVAGES. ABORIGINAL'S PLEA. TREATMENT BY WHITES DENOUNCED." - Anthony Martin Fernando (aged 65 years), toy hawker, an aboriginal, born near Sydney, was remanded for a month at the Old Bailey". The Brisbane Courier. 2 February 1929.
- ""FARMER COMES TO HIS AID: ELDERLY BLACK IN COURT"." - The intervention of an elderly Essex farmer saved an Australian aborigine, Anthony Fernando, aged 73 years .. from being sent to prison. '". The Argus. 21 January 1938.
- Steve Meacham, "Aboriginal activist campaigned in Europe 100 years ago", Sydney Morning Herald, May 27, 2012.
