= Maria Lock =

Aboriginal Australian landowner

- Born: c. 1808; Hawkesbury River, New South Wales, Australia
- Died: 6 June 1878; Windsor, New South Wales, Australia

Maria Lock, also known as Maria Locke, (née Cook; c. 1805 – 6 June 1878) was an Aboriginal Australian landowner in the Darug area of Western Sydney. Lock is significant in Australian history due to her educational achievements, having the first legally recognised marriage between a settler and an Aboriginal person, and later for being a landowner in early colonial times.

== Early life ==
Lock was born at Richmond Bottoms by the Hawkesbury River to Yarramundi, 'Chief of the Richmond Tribes'. The family belonged to the Boorooberongal clan of the Darug people.

== Education ==
In 1814, Lock was placed at the Native Institution at Parramatta for tuition by William and Elizabeth Shelley. Here she was given the name Maria Cook. The achievement of a black girl, aged 14, believed to be Maria Lock, winning first prize in a NSW examination ahead of approximately 120 other students was reported in the Sydney Gazette on 17 April 1819. Her teachers reported her to be well ahead of the other students, with an early grasp on the English language and above-average educational performance.

== Work and family life ==
By the end of 1822 it is thought that Lock was living at the household of Rev. Thomas Hassall and his wife Anne in Parramatta where she worked as a domestic. That same year Lock, living with the Hassall family, married Thomas Walker "Dickey" Coke, a son of Bennelong, who had also been in the Native Institution. Within weeks of their marriage Coke became ill and died. However, the facts of her employment within the Hassall household and marriage to Dickey are in contention, as information in her later petition for land states that she continued in the Native Institution school until she was married to Robert Lock.

On 26 January 1824 she married Robert Lock, also spelt Locke (1800–1854). He was an illiterate convict carpenter. This was the first legalised and recognised marriage between a European settler and an Aboriginal person in the colony, and he was assigned to her. This took place at St John's Church, Parramatta. Together Maria and Robert had 10 children, nine of which made it to adulthood.

== Land grant ==
Maria and Robert initially settled on a small farm belonging to Native Institution, but later moved to the employ of Rev. Robert Cartwright at Liverpool. In March 1831, she petitioned Ralph Darling for her deceased brother Colebee's grant at Blacktown, opposite the Native Institution. 40 acres were granted to Robert on Maria's behalf, but Cartwright frustrated this claim as he felt it was injurious to the established buildings on his adjoining allotment. However, Maria persisted and in 1833 was granted forty more acres at Liverpool, again in Robert's name. She then received her brother's 30 acre grant in 1843. In 1844, Maria and her husband returned to Blacktown where they were granted another 30 acres.

== Final years ==
Lock died on 6 June 1878 in Windsor and was buried beside her husband Robert at St Bartholomew's Church of England, Prospect. Her burial registration reads "Last of the Aboriginals from Blacktown", and wrongly gives her birth date as 1794. Her land was divided equally among her children and was occupied by her descendants until 1920, when the freehold land was considered to be an Aboriginal reserve (Plumpton) and was revoked by the Aboriginal Protection Board. Dozens of families continue to trace their ancestry through Maria, her father Yarramundi and her grandfather Gomebeeree, stretching back to the 1740s.

== Recognition ==
A tunnel boring machine used in New South Wales is named after her.
