= Colebee and Nurragingy Land Grant =

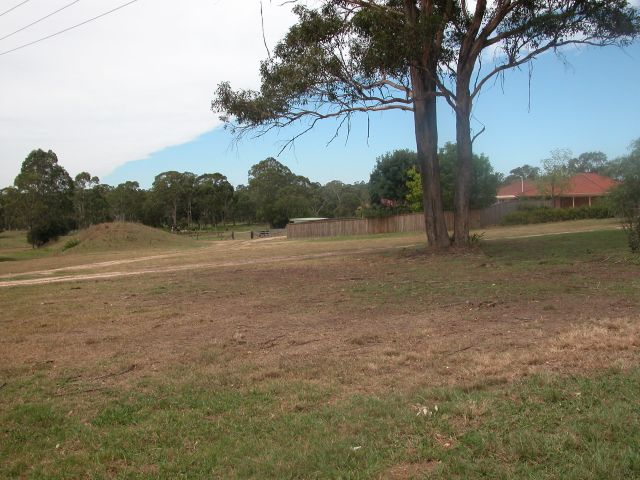
- Richmond Road part of the site

- Location within New South Wales Location within Australia
- 33.7256°S 150.8486°E
- Location: Richmond Road, Colebee, Sydney, New South Wales, Australia

Site notes
- Owner: Transport for NSW

New South Wales Heritage Register
- Official name: Colebee and Nurragingy Land Grant; Colebee and Nurragingy's Land Grant; Colebee Release Area; 773; 777; 783 Richmond Road
- Type: state heritage (archaeological-terrestrial)
- Designated: 10 February 2012
- Reference no.: 1877
- Type: Post-contact Site
- Category: Aboriginal

Colebee and Nurragingy Land Grant is a heritage-listed former farm at Richmond Road, Colebee, Sydney, New South Wales, Australia. It is also known as Colebee and Nurragingy's Land Grant, Colebee Release Area, 773, 777 and 783 Richmond Road. The property is owned by Transport for NSW.

== History ==
The history of the Colebee/Nurragingy Land Grant must be understood within the context of the early colonial history of Sydney. The spread of colonial settlement from Sydney Harbour to the western plains occurred quite rapidly within the first 15 years of European arrival in Australia. As British settlers took up allotments, their farmlands expanded to the west across traditional Aboriginal hunting grounds. With this increasing European presence, traditional Aboriginal resources were subsumed and conflict inevitably developed. Conflict between the two communities was particularly prevalent during periods of drought.

A period of drought between 1814 and 1816 resulted in the escalation of violence between settlers and local Aboriginal people, particularly along the Hawkesbury and Nepean Rivers. When the local Aboriginal people found their traditional food resources gone, they utilised the settlers crops and animals that had replaced them. However, the European settlers, seeing this as theft, often shot Aboriginal people, resulting in subsequent reprisals and violence.

In April 1816 Governor Macquarie responded to the violence by ordering a punitive expedition. Groups of soldiers were sent from Sydney to Cowpastures, the Appin, Parramatta and Windsor districts and along the banks of the Nepean. Governor Macquarie directed the soldiers to capture or kill Aboriginal people involved in the disputes with settlers. A number of Aboriginal guides accompanied these parties, including Colebee and Nurragingy.

Following the punitive expedition of 1816, Macquarie presented Nurragingy with a breastplate inscribed "Chief of the South Creek Tribe" and, in recognition of their involvement in the punitive expeditions, jointly granted Colebee and Nurragingy 30 acres of land. This was the first such grant to be issued to Aboriginal people in Australia's history. The grant was registered in 1819, but was only registered in Colebee's name. Colebee did not stay long on the grant but Nurragingy stayed there growing various crops and practising animal husbandry.

The location of the land grant was significant because it was an Aboriginal choice, being on land belonging to Nurragingy's clan. The land also included sites such as "Iron Bark Range" which was a high campsite well above the flooding of eastern creek and a source of silcrete. Archaeological surveys of the Blacktown (and specifically Plumpton Ridge) area have recorded a range of evidence in this area. The area became a centre of Aboriginal life during this early phase of colonisation.

After the passing of Colebee and Nurragingy, the land was claimed by 1843 by two of Nurragingy's sons and Colebee's younger sister, Maria Lock (also known as Maria Locke) . Maria, a student at the Parramatta Native Institution from 1815, married Robert Locke, a convict from Norfolk, England, in 1824. As the original land grant had been registered in Colebee's name only, the land was passed to Maria, and Maria and Robert along with their ten children took up residence on the land grant. Some time later they also acquired the 30 acre grant to the south that had originally been granted to Sylvanus Williams and had been purchased by the Native Institution in 1822. Maria Locke died in 1878 and was outlived by nine of her children. Following her death, the 60 acres was divided into nine lots for her nine surviving children.

The Locke family lived on the property until around 1917 when the Aborigines Protection Board acquired the land. The Aboriginal Protection Board sold the land off after World War II. When Walter Locke attempted to reclaim the land in 1970 he was informed by authorities that this was not possible, because the family had left the land. In the late 1970s local Blacktown author Kevin Moore wrote a series of pamphlets in which he called this resumption of the land grant "a scandalous malversion of Macquarie's grant for the use of the Aborigines".

In the late 1970s Lots 1 and 2 of Maria Locke's subdivision were purchased by the NSW Planning and Environment Commission, and in 1980 by the Commissioner for Main Roads. In 2003, a small portion of the land fronting Richmond Road was required for road widening. This included part of Lots 1 and 2 of Maria Locke's subdivision. The land resumed for road widening was referred to as Lots 14 to 18 in DP 1048332. In 2006, a further strip of land adjacent to Lots 14 to 17 DP 1048332, was resumed for road widening. This strip of land was resumed from Lots 1, 2 and 3 of Maria Locke's subdivision and is referred to as Lot 51 DP 1104950.

== Description ==
The site of the Colebee/Nurragingy Land Grant is today predominantly undeveloped rural land. The land grant is bounded by Richmond Road along its western side and is surrounded by rural land parcels to the east and south. Immediately north of the site is an industrial complex. The subject site retains a rural character, although some residences have been constructed along the Richmond Road frontage. The land grant is bisected by Bells Creek, which runs in a north-easterly direction. The site retains remnant vegetation across its eastern half and along Bells Creek, while clearing has had a greater effect across the western half of the property, towards Richmond Road.

The land grant retains much of its original natural setting and character, with remnant vegetation surviving along Bells Creek and across the eastern side of the property. The site has undergone some clearing and modification associated with the construction of houses and other buildings along the Richmond Road frontage; some sections of Bells Creek appear to have been modified to facilitate water flow. The creek and its setting serve as a visible feature within the site, retaining links with the former landscape and helping the land grant to retain some of its original integrity.

The subject site encompasses four of the nine lot attributed to Maria Locke's subdivision of the Colebee and Williams land grants dated 1884. The four lots that comprise the original grant are located at the north end of the 60 acres owned by the Lock family.

Residential development has occurred on the Richmond Road frontage of Lot 30 DP1076671, Lot 86 DP752030 and Lot 9 DP976148.

=== Archaeological assessment ===
A historical archaeological assessment conducted by ERM in 2003 registered Colebee and Nurragingy's land grant on the Aboriginal Heritage Information Management System as a Potential Archaeological Deposit (PAD) - Contact Site. The site listing notes that while the area contains no physical evidence of Colebee's house or associated fencing or structures, the area of the original land grant is designated as a PAD because the following items are historically documented as having been constructed within the land grant:

- a bark and log hut with a chimney
- gardens
- fencing
- domestic structures such as sheds and animal enclosures
- vegetable patches
- crops

The listing also states that there is some potential for the study area to contain evidence of Aboriginal camps which date to 1819 to 1823 and prior to this time.

A PAD has also been registered by Navin Officer Heritage Consultants. The area is considered to have moderate potential to contain subsurface archaeological deposits. This PAD is located on either side of Bells Creek between the creek and Richmond Road and a track into a dirt bike track. The registered area is outside the original land grant however, according to Navin Officer Heritage Consultants it is likely that the PAD extends along the length of Bells Creek .

== Heritage listing ==
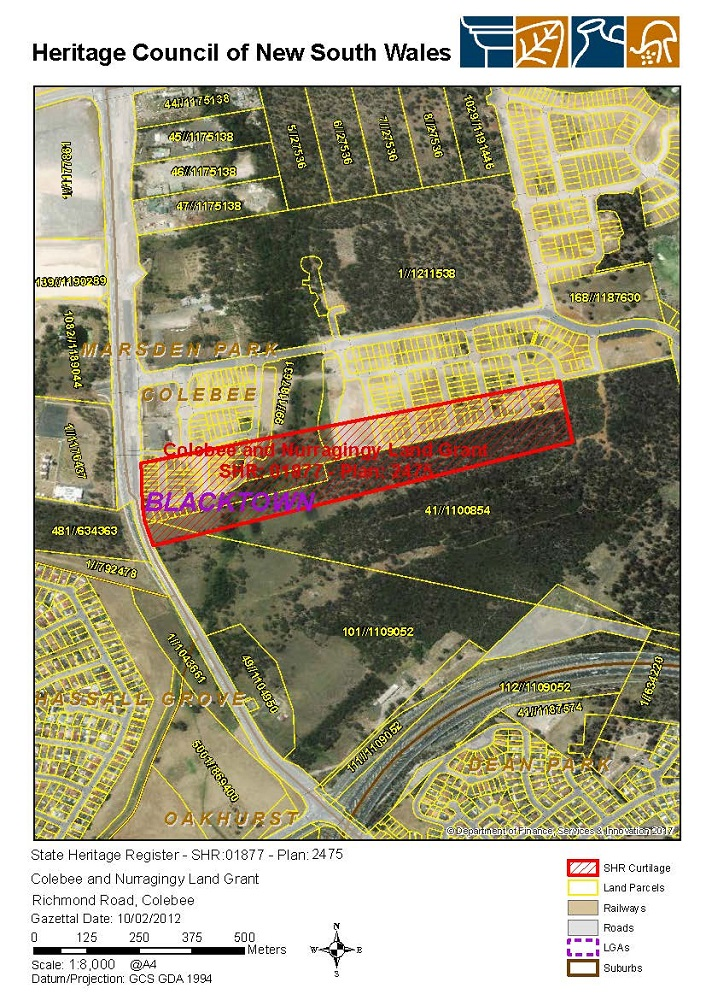
Heritage boundaries

The Colebee/Nurragingy Land Grant is a site of state heritage significance because of its combination of historical, social and cultural values. The site was the first land grant ever given to Aboriginal people in Australia. The land grant is associated with two significant Aboriginal figures from the early colonial period-Nurragingy and Colebee-to whom the land was jointly granted in 1816. The location of the land grant is significant because it was an Aboriginal choice, being on land belonging to Nurragingy's clan. The land grant is valued by the contemporary Aboriginal community and the wider Australian community as a landmark in the history of cross-cultural engagement in Australia. For Aboriginal people, in particular, it represents a key historical site symbolising Aboriginal resilience and enduring links to the land

Colebee and Nurragingy Land Grant was listed on the New South Wales State Heritage Register on 10 February 2012 having satisfied the following criteria.

The place is important in demonstrating the course, or pattern, of cultural or natural history in New South Wales.

For Aboriginal and non-Aboriginal people the Colebee/Nurragingy Land Grant is an important landmark in the history of black and white relations in Australia. The site represents the earliest attempts of Aboriginal people to engage with and to establish their autonomy within European society.

The land grant was the first to be issued to Aboriginal people, and thus reflects a colonial policy asserting the belief that Aboriginal people did not own their traditional lands but that they should be granted land by the government of the time. In this way, the government policy behind the issuing of the land grant can be viewed as a genesis of the later Aboriginal land rights struggle in Australia.

The Colebee/Nurragingy Land Grant is also associated with the nearby Blacktown Native Institution, being the place where many Aboriginal families camped to be near to their children within the institution. Therefore, the land grant also represents parents' refusals to accept separation from their children by remaining on land nearby. The land grant is significant as a symbol of the persistence of Aboriginal traditions, especially kinship ties and attachment to place.

The place has a strong or special association with a person, or group of persons, of importance of cultural or natural history of New South Wales's history.

The Colebee/Nurragingy Land Grant is strongly associated with Colebee and Nurragingy, two key historical Aboriginal figures, as well as Governor Lachlan Macquarie, who issued the land grant in 1816. As a part of the Black Town it is also associated with the Aboriginal people who formed a community around this area, which has persisted to the present day.

Both Colebee and Nurragingy feature within the early colonial history of western Sydney, participating in Macquarie's punitive expeditions and being the first Aboriginal people to be granted land. Nurragingy selected the location of the land grant, choosing land within his traditional clan territory. This settlement became a centre for Aboriginal life in the early colonial period and thus influenced the siting of the nearby Blacktown Native Institution.

The Colebee/Nurragingy Land Grant is associated with Governor Lachlan Macquarie, reflecting the outcomes of Macquarie's policy towards Indigenous people. The land grant reflects Governor and Mrs Macquarie's concern for the Indigenous inhabitants of the colony and their philanthropic objectives, featuring the beliefs that Aboriginal people should be segregated from the corrupting influence of European society.

The land grant is also strongly associated with the Locke family. Maria Locke was the first pupil of the Parramatta Native Institution to be judged a "success" by Europeans. Maria married ex-convict Robert Locke in 1824. Their marriage was the first officially sanctioned union between a convict and an Aboriginal woman. After Nurragingy's death Maria petitioned Governor Darling for the Colebee/Nurragingy Land Grant. Her claim was successful and the Locke family took up residence on the grant.

The place has a strong or special association with a particular community or cultural group in New South Wales for social, cultural or spiritual reasons.

For the Aboriginal community the site represents Aboriginal peoples survival following colonialism and the damage inflicted upon their society by colonial dispossession. The site provides a link with the early Aboriginal settlement at Blacktown and specifically to Colebee and Nurragingy.

The place has potential to yield information that will contribute to an understanding of the cultural or natural history of New South Wales.

The site has the potential to contain archaeological relics and deposits that could provide information (that may not be available from other sources) about the nature, extend and experience of Aboriginal occupation of the land grant during the early contact period. Archaeological remains could contribute to a better understanding of the spatial occupation and use of the land grant by Colebee, Nurragingy and their families, as well as others who may have occupied the site during the period. Potential archaeological remains associated with the Colebee and Nurragingy land grant may include historically documented domestic features, including a bark and log hut with a chimney, as well as associated rural features and structures (e.g. gardens, fencing, sheds, animal enclosures and evidence of former vegetable patches and crops). There is some potential for the site to contain evidence of Aboriginal camps which date to 1819-1823 and prior to this time, as well as Aboriginal burials.

The place possesses uncommon, rare or endangered aspects of the cultural or natural history of New South Wales.

The Colebee/Nurragingy Land Grant is the first land granted to Aboriginal people in Australia's history. The site is rare in its direct connection to several prominent Aboriginal historical figures, Colebee and Nurragingy.
