= Dharug =

Aboriginal Australian people

Dharug people
- aka Darug, Dharruk, Dharrook, Darrook, Dharung, Broken Bay tribe
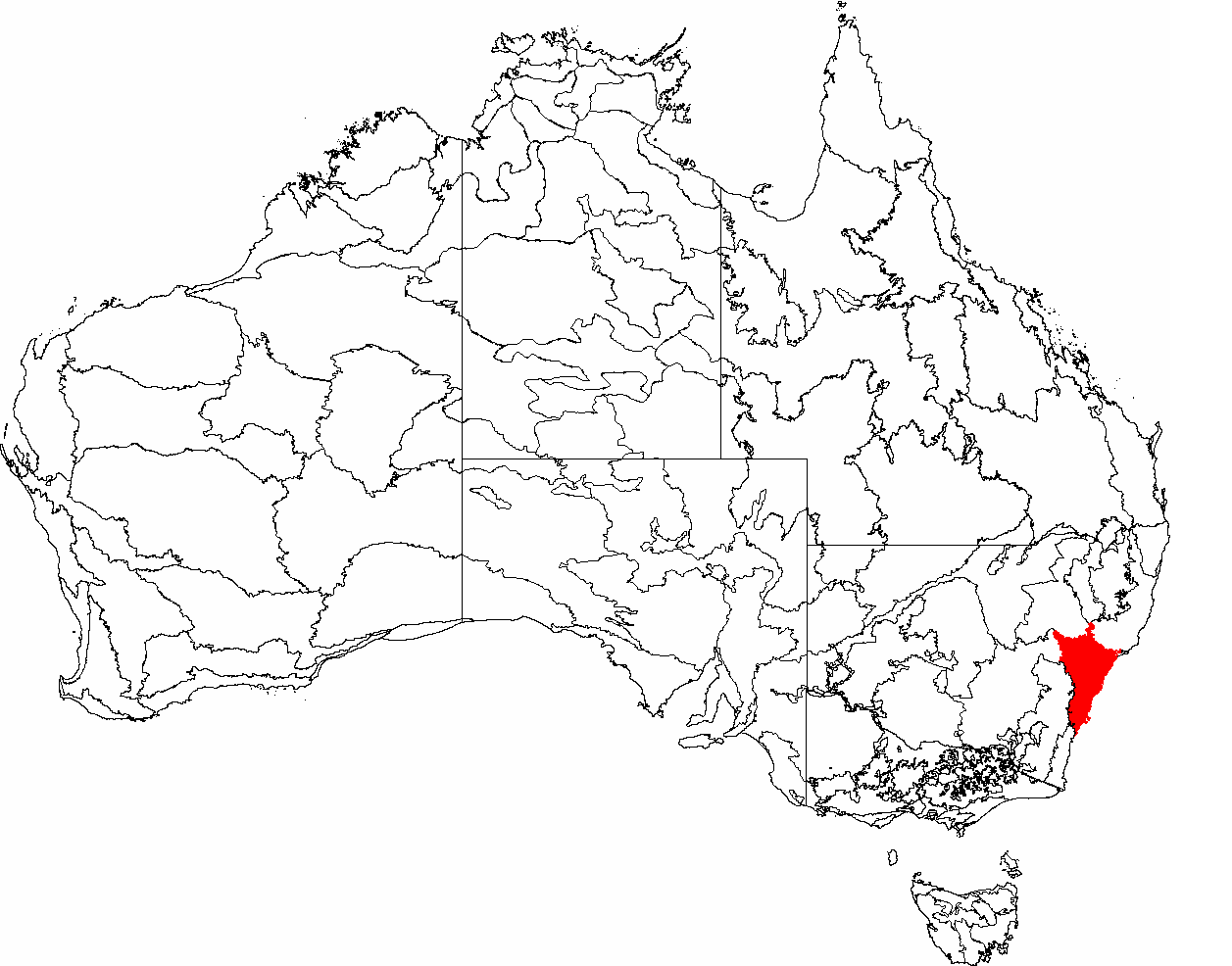
- Sydney Basin bioregion

Hierarchy
- Language family: Pama–Nyungan
- Language branch: Yuin–Kuric
- Language group: Dharug
- Group dialects: Inland Dharug & Coastal Dharug

Area (approx. 6,000 sq. km)
- Bioregion: Cumberland Plain, Sydney basin
- Location: Sydney, New South Wales, Australia
- Coordinates: 33°35′S 150°35′E
- Mountains: Blue Mountains
- Rivers: Cooks, Georges, Hawkesbury, Lane Cove, Nepean, Parramatta

Notable individuals
- Pemulwuy
- Anthony Fernando

The Dharug or Darug people, are a nation of Aboriginal Australian clans, who share ties of kinship, country and culture. In pre-colonial times, they lived as hunters in the region of current day Sydney. The Darug speak one of two dialects of the Dharug language related to their coastal or inland groups. There was armed conflict between the Dharug and the English settlers in the first half of the 19th century. Controversy over land rights, deference to culture and official return of Dharug artifacts, such as the skull of the warrior Pemulwuy, were a main cause of such conflict.

== Dharug country ==
Dharug country covers an area of approximately 6,000 km^{2} (2,300 square miles). To the east it extends to the sea, including the Gadigal country as the dominant clan. In the north, it reaches the Hawkesbury River and its mouth at Broken Bay, creating a border with the Awabakal. To the northwest, the Dharug country extends to the town of Mount Victoria in the Blue Mountains meeting the Darkinjung. To the west, Wiradjuri country begins at the eastern fringe of the Blue Mountains. To the southwest, in the Southern Highlands, is the border with Gandangara country. In the southeast, in the Illawarra area is the border with the traditional Tharawal lands. The Dharug traditional country includes the areas around Campbelltown, Liverpool, Camden, Penrith and Windsor.

== Dharug language and people ==
The Dharug language, has two dialects; one inland and one coastal, with the coastal dialect also known as Eora.

The word myall, now a pejorative word in Australian English denoting any Aboriginal person who keeps a traditional way of life, originated in the Dharug language. In Dharug, the word mayal means anyone from another clan or country.

The two dialects are associated with the activities of the inland (paiendra or "tool people") and the coastal (katungal or "sea people") people, respectively. Traditionally, the paiendra hunted kangaroos, emus and other land animals, and used stone axes more extensively than the katungal. The katungal built canoes, harvesting primarily seafood diet, including fish and shellfish from Sydney Harbour, Botany Bay and their associated rivers.

=== Clans ===
The clans of the Dharug nation can be divided into two broad groups based upon their language dialect: the inland Dharug, and the coastal Dharug (also known as Eora). Each of these clans and their descendant clans consisted of approximately 50 to 400 individuals resident to their own particular geographic area. James Kohen, academic and expert witness for the Dharug people, describes 15 clans while others describe 29 individual clans.

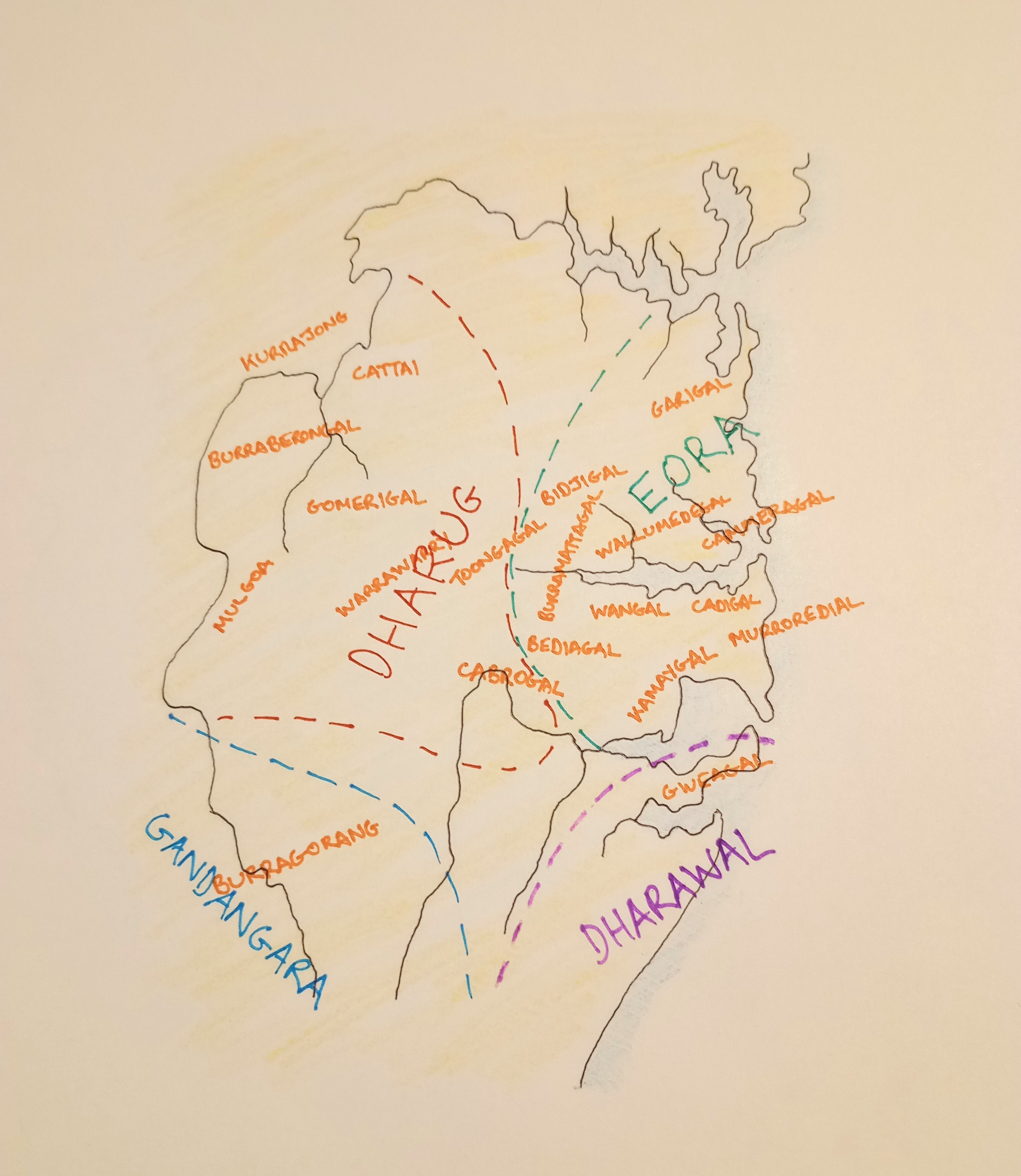
Map of the Indigenous clans of the Sydney region

Coastal Dharug (Eora)

- Bediagal
- Bidjigal
- Birrabirragal
- Borogegal
- Burramattagal
- Cadigal (Gadigal)
- Cammeraygal
- Cannalgal
- Garigal
- Gorualgal
- Kamaygal
- Kayimai
- Murroredial
- Turramerragal
- Wallumettagal
- Wangal

Inland Dharug

- Cabrogal
- Cattai
- Boolbainora
- Buruberongal
- Cannemegal
- Gommerigal
- Kurrajong
- Mulgoa
- Toongagal (Tugagal)
- Warrawarry (Wandeandegal)
- Murringong

== History of contact ==
Between 1794 and about 1830, the Hawkesbury River area was a place of conflict between Dharug people and the more than 400 British settlers in the region. The farms created by the settlers disrupted access to the river and the gathering of food by the Dharug. Dharug who took crops from the farms were killed, for example, by gibbeting or hanging, by the settlers. The Dharug burned the farmers' crops in retaliation. In 1795, as the level of conflict escalated, government troops were sent to protect the settlers. In 1801, Governor King ordered troops to patrol farms on the Georges River and to shoot any Dharug on sight. In 1816, Governor Macquarie forbade Aboriginals to carry any weapons within two kilometres of a house or a town or to congregate in groups bigger than six. He also authorised settlers to establish vigilante groups and the addition of three new military outposts.

A group led by Pemulwuy, a Dharug warrior, raided Parramatta, where he was severely wounded and then fled. His group was accused of killing four settlers and of raping women. The government issued orders for his capture, dead or alive. He was shot and killed by two settlers in 1802. His head was severed, pickled and dispatched by King to Sir Joseph Banks. Although William, Prince of Wales advised he would return Pemulwuy's remains, in 2010, the skull had not been located.

Tedbury, Pemluwuy's son, raided farms until 1810. Mosquito, another warrior, led raids for about 20 years before he was captured and hanged in Van Diemen's land (now Tasmania) 1823.

Smallpox, introduced in 1789 by the British, led to the deaths of up to 90% of the Dharug population in some areas. For safety, some Dharug moved to live in the sandstone caves and overhangs of the Hawksbury river region, while others remained in dwellings made from bark, sticks and branches.

== Controversy ==
A place of deep Dharug cultural importance is an area previously called "Blacks Town" and now the suburb of Colebee, which lies in the Blacktown local government area. In 2012, City of Blacktown ceased recognition of the Dharug people as the traditional owners of the area. The council also passed a motion, opposed by some councillors, to begin a process to consider changing the name "Blacktown". In response, an online petition was launched calling for the recognition of the Dharug people.

In 2020, the Hills Shire Council, whose local government area includes Dharug land, rejected requests to include an Acknowledgement of Country at its meetings. It is the only Sydney local council that does not include an Acknowledgement of Country at its meetings.

== Notable Dharug people ==
- Jamal Idris, Australian professional rugby league footballer
- Anthony Fernando, early 20th-century activist
- Daniel Moowattin, third Australian Aboriginal person to visit England
- Marion Leane Smith, only Australian Aboriginal woman known to have served in the First World War
- Yarramundi, Boorooberongal Dharug clansman, whose daughter, Maria Lock and son, Colebee are associated with the early history of assimilation in Australia
- Maria Lock, Boorooberongal Dharug landowner in colonial times
- Quincy Dodd, Australian rugby league player
- Joshua Curran, Australian rugby league player

== Alternative names ==
- Dharruk, Dharrook, Dhar'rook, Darrook, Dharug

Source: Tindale 1974, p. 193

== See also ==
- Wangal
- Eora

== Sources ==
- Broome, Richard (2019). Aboriginal Australians: A History Since 1788. Allen & Unwin. ISBN 978-1760528218.
- Diaz, Jess (1 November 2012). "(this link no longer exists) A Liberal controlled City Council of Blacktown (this link no longer exists)". Kalatas Australia.
- Dixon, Robert M. W. (2002). Australian Languages: Their Nature and Development. Vol. 1. Cambridge University Press. ISBN 978-0-521-47378-1.
- Flynn, Michael (August 1997). "Holroyd history and the Silent Boundary Project" (PDF). Holroyd City Council. Archived from the original (PDF) on 21 July 2008.
- Hughes, Joan (1989). Australian words and their origins. Oxford University Press. ISBN 978-0-195-53087-2.
- Mathews, R. H. (1897). "Burbung of the Darkinung tribes" (PDF). Proceedings of the Royal Society of Victoria. 10: 1–12.
- Mathews, R. H. (January 1898). "Initiation ceremonies of Australian tribes: Appendix Nguttan initiation ceremony". Proceedings of the American Philosophical Society. 37 (157): 54–73. JSTOR 983694.
- Mathews, R. H. (1901). "Dharruk language and vocabulary". Proceedings of the Royal Society of New South Wales. 35: 155–160 – via BHL.
- Mathews, R. H.; Everitt, Mary Martha (1900). "Organisation, language and initiation ceremonies of the aborigines of the south-east coast of New South Wales". Proceedings of the Royal Society of New South Wales. 34: 262–281. doi:10.5962/p.359348 – via BHL.
- Mossfield, Tony (2000). "Yooroang Gorang –Strong Place". In Collins, Jock; Poynting, Scott (eds.). The Other Sydney: Communities, Identities and Inequalities in Western Sydney. Common Ground. pp. 151–180. ISBN 978-1-863-35017-4.
- Petersen, Eskild; Chen, Lin Hwei; Schlagenhauf-Lawlor, Patricia (2017). Infectious Diseases: A Geographic Guide (2nd ed.). John Wiley & Sons. ISBN 978-1-119-08574-4.
- Tindale, Norman Barnett (1974). Aboriginal Tribes of Australia: Their Terrain, Environmental Controls, Distribution, Limits, and Proper Names. Australian National University Press. ISBN 978-0-708-10741-6.
- Troy, Jakelin (1992). "The Sydney Language Notebooks and responses to language contact in early colonial NSW" (PDF). Australian Journal of Linguistics. 12 (1): 145–170. doi:10.1080/07268609208599474.
- Tuckerman, J. (1887). "The Hawkesbury River and Broken Bay" (PDF). In Curr, Edward Micklethwaite (ed.). The Australian race: its origin, languages, customs, place of landing in Australia and the routes by which it spread itself over the continent. Vol. 3. Melbourne: J. Ferres. pp. 358–359 – via Internet Archive.
- Wilson, Bill; O'Brien, Justin (2003). ""To infuse an universal terror": a reappraisal of the Coniston killings" (PDF). Aboriginal History. 17: 59–78.
- Xiao, Alison (24 June 2020). "Hills Shire Council Acknowledgement of Country motion defeated again". ABC News.
