= List of George Cross recipients =

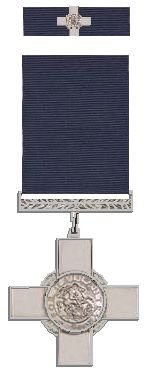
The George Cross and ribbon

The George Cross (GC) is the second highest award of the United Kingdom honours system. It is awarded for gallantry not "in the presence of the enemy" to both members of the British armed forces and to British civilians. Posthumous awards have always been available. It was previously awarded to Commonwealth countries, most of which have established their own honours systems and no longer recommend British honours. It may be awarded to a person of any military rank in any service and to civilians including police, emergency services and merchant seamen. Many of the awards have been personally presented by the British monarch to recipients and in the case of posthumous awards to next of kin. These investitures are usually held at Buckingham Palace.

Initially, the Empire Gallantry Medal recognised acts of the highest bravery but was never considered equal in status to the Victoria Cross. The George Cross succeeded the Empire Gallantry Medal and all those living who had been awarded the medal, and all posthumous awards from the outbreak of World War II, were obliged to exchange their medal for the George Cross. In 1971, the living recipients of either the Albert Medal for Lifesaving or Edward Medal, that respectively recognised the saving of life and acts of bravery following industrial accidents, were invited to exchange their medals for the George Cross; 24 recipients elected not to exchange their medals.

Since the Second World War most Commonwealth realms have instituted their own honours systems with the second highest award being for gallantry not in the face of the enemy. In 1972, Canada created the Cross of Valour for Canadian citizens; in 1975 Australia, inspired by Canada, created a similar award with the same name in the Australian Honours System, the Cross of Valour. Recipients of the Canadian and Australian awards both use the postnominal CV. Unlike the GC within British honours, the majority of Canadian CV awards and all Australian CV awards have been to civilians. The Australian Government ceased recommendations for British awards in 1983 and the last two Australian state governments ceased recommendations in 1989. During the period when Australian states made recommendations for British awards, the Governor of Victoria recommended a GC which was granted. The award gazetted in 1978 was for 39 years the most recent award to a living civilian, until the award in 2017 to Dominic Troulan. On 5 October 1992, the Australian Prime Minister announced that Australian governments would make no further recommendations for British honours with British awards to Australians after that date being treated as foreign awards. The Queen on the recommendation of the Governor-General of New Zealand awarded the New Zealand Cross, instituted in 1999 to four individuals. There were two awards in 1999 and another two awards in 2021. The postnominal is NZC.

There have been 407 George Cross awards, including two special awards, but no honorary awards. Some recipients serving in British forces were foreign born, including Albert Guérisse (Belgium), Violette Szabo (France), and Noor Inayat Khan (Russia). All three served within the Special Operations Executive during World War II. As of November 2023 there are 12 living recipients.

== Individual awards ==
This list contains all George Cross recipients including former recipients of the Empire Gallantry Medal, the Albert Medal or the Edward Medal who exchanged their earlier award for the George Cross.

The table defaults to sorting alphabetically by name. When sorting by the heading "Rank (or Role)", military ranks take precedence, followed by police ranks and then all civilian roles. Military ranks are sorted by the comparative rank of the recipient within the British Armed Forces, where the Royal Navy takes precedence, followed by the British Army and then Royal Air Force.

It is customary for Indian and Nepalese names to be written with the family name first, which is followed below unless their citation dictates otherwise.

This along with an * (asterisk) indicates that the gazetted award was posthumous.
This along with ** indicates the individual is alive as of 7 November 2026

Name	Rank (or Role)	Organisation	Award	Date gazetted	Image
Edmund Geoffrey Abbott	Lieutenant	Royal Navy	AM	12 March 1920	—
George Fawcett Pitts Abbott	Deck Hand	Royal Naval Reserve	AM	12 December 1917	—
George John Adamson	Inspector	River Traffic Police, Calcutta, Bengal	EGM	1 February 1937	—
Thomas Edward Alder	Lance Sergeant	British Army	EGM	4 August 1931	—
Thomas Hopper Alderson	Detachment Leader	Air Raid Precautions	GC	30 September 1940	—
Yousef Hussein Ali Bey	Kaid	Transjordan Frontier Force	EGM	3 January 1939	—
Florence Alice Allen	Nurse	—	AM	19 November 1935	—
Ernest Allport	Miner	Bentley Colliery Mine Rescue Team	EM	30 September 1932	—
Frederick Christie Anderson	Chief Engine Room Artificer First Class	Royal Navy	EGM	8 June 1939	—
Walter Anderson	Flying Officer	Royal Air Force	EGM	12 April 1929	—
Wallace Launcelot Andrews	Second Lieutenant	British Army	EGM	17 September 1940	—
Mateen Ahmed Ansari	Captain (acting)	7th Rajput Regiment	GC	18 April 1946*	—
Bertram Stuart Trevelyan Archer	Lieutenant (acting)	Royal Engineers	GC	30 September 1941	—
Robert Selby Armitage	Temporary Sub-Lieutenant	Royal Naval Volunteer Reserve	GC	27 December 1940	—
Reginald William Armytage	Lieutenant	Royal Navy	AM	2 August 1928	—
Walter Arnold	Leading Aircraftman	Royal Air Force	EGM	9 November 1928	—
Doreen Ashburnham-Ruffner	—	—	AM	21 December 1917	Devid C. Western (youngest recipient of Albert Medal) and Doreen Ashburnham (youngest recipient woman of Albert Medal and George Cross)
Ashraf-un-Nisa Begum	—	—	EGM	1 February 1937	—
Thomas Atkinson	Corporal	British Army	EGM	25 July 1939	—
Awang anak Raweng	Iban Tracker	Federation of Malaya	GC	20 November 1951	—
John Axon	Driver	British Railways	GC	7 May 1957*	—
John Herbert Babington	Temporary Sub-Lieutenant	Royal Naval Volunteer Reserve	GC	27 December 1940	—
Eric George Bailey	Sergeant 3rd Class	New South Wales Police Force	GC	29 October 1946*	
George Stewart Bain-Smith	Lieutenant	British Army	AM	30 September 1927	—
John Thomas Baker	Trainee Coalminer	—	EM	22 November 1929	—
Arthur Gerald Bagot	Sub-Lieutenant	Royal Naval Volunteer Reserve	AM	20 August 1918	—
Singh Baldev	Sub-Inspector	Punjab Police	EGM	1 January 1932	—
Wilson Charles Geoffrey Baldwin	Doctor	—	EM	16 April 1943	—
John (Jack) Bamford	Colliery worker	—	GC	16 December 1952	—
Arthur Banks	Sergeant	Desert Air Force	GC	5 November 1946*	
Herbert John Leslie Barefoot	Major (acting)	Royal Engineers	GC	22 January 1941	—
Barkat Singh	Naik	Indian Army	EGM	1 January 1938	—
William Barnett	Lance Corporal	British Army	EGM	27 November 1936	—
Arnold Barraclough	Sergeant	Indian Army	EGM	25 November 1930	—
Norman Baster	Colliery Agent	—	EM	17 April 1936	—
Gordon Love Bastian	Senior Engineering Officer	merchant seaman	AM	17 August 1943	—
William Frederick Baxter	—	—	EM	1 May 1942	—
Clive Cyril Anthony Bayley	Trooper	Indian Army	EGM	24 July 1931	—
George William Beaman	—	—	EM	17 April 1936	—
John Beattie	—	—	EGM	3 May 1927	—
James Wallace Beaton**	Inspector	Metropolitan Police Force	GC	27 September 1974	—
John Archibald Beckett	Sergeant	Royal Air Force	GC	16 December 1947*	—
John Frederick Bell	—	—	EGM	20 December 1930	—
Michael Paul Benner	Second Lieutenant	Royal Engineers	GC	17 June 1958*	—
Bhim Singh Yadava	Sub-Inspector	Punjab Police	EGM	1 January 1932	—
Bhupendra Narayan Singh	Shri	—	EGM	19 June 1934	—
Kenneth Alfred Biggs	Major (temporary)	Royal Army Ordnance Corps	GC	11 October 1946	—
Richard Blackburn	Private	British Army	EGM	23 June 1936	—
Sydney Blackburn	—	—	EM	21 November 1947	—
Michael Floud Blaney	Captain (acting)	Royal Engineers	GC	15 April 1941*	—
Henry George Blogg	Coxswain	Cromer Lifeboat	EGM	30 June 1924	Henry Blogg
Theodore Bogdanovitch	Mulazim	Trans-Jordan Frontier Force	EGM	30 June 1939	—
David Noel Booker	—	—	EM	4 February 1938	—
Samuel Booker	—	—	EM	4 February 1938	—
Douglas Alexander Brett	Major	Indian Army	EGM	8 May 1934	—
John Bridge	Lieutenant (temporary)	Royal Naval Volunteer Reserve	GC	20 June 1944	John Banks
David Broadfoot	Radio Officer	Merchant Navy – MV Princess Victoria	GC	6 October 1953*	—
Francis Haffey Brooke-Smith	Sub-Lieutenant	Royal Naval Reserve	GC	27 June 1941	—
Arthur Brooks	Private	British Army	EGM	19 November 1935	—
David Brown	—	—	EM	13 January 1948	—
Richard Leslie Brown	2nd Lieutenant	British Army	AM	4 January 1918	—
Oliver Campbell Bryson	Lieutenant	Royal Flying Corps	AM	11 January 1918	—
Henry Buckle	Mate	Royal Navy	AM	27 April 1920	—
John Burke	—	—	EGM	3 June 1925	—
Herbert Edgar Burton	Major	—	EGM	30 June 1924	—
Arthur Richard Cecil Butson	Doctor	—	AM	28 September 1948	—
William John Button	Lance Sergeant	British Army	EGM	17 September 1940	—
Richard Arthur Samuel Bywater	Factory Development Officer	Ministry of Supply	GC	26 September 1944	—
Alexander Fraser Campbell	Second Lieutenant	Royal Engineers	GC	22 January 1941*	—
Michael Patrick Campion	Leading Aircraftman	Royal Air Force	EGM	5 July 1940	—
Horace James Cannon	Flight Sergeant	Royal Flying Corps	AM	26 April 1918	—
Jack Chalmers	—	—	AM	7 July 1922	—
Robert Mills Chalmers	Petty Officer	Royal Navy	EGM	18 June 1926	—
Frederick Chant	Private	British Army	EGM	2 June 1923	—
John Daniel Charlton	—	—	EM	10 February 1948	—
Wilson Hodgson Charlton	Flight Lieutenant (acting)	Royal Air Force	GC	21 January 1944	
Harold Francis Charrington	Assistant Civil Engineer	Air Ministry Works Department, Middle East Command	EGM	8 March 1940	—
Frederick William Child	—	—	EGM	5 May 1939	—
Joseph Clark	—	—	EGM	3 May 1927	—
Azariah Clarke	—	—	EM	5 August 1938	—
Donald Owen Clarke	Apprentice	Merchant Navy	GC	20 July 1943*	
Walter Charles Cleall	—	—	AM	30 December 1919	—
John Clements	Teacher	Sherrardswood School	GC	7 December 1976*	—
Gerald Charles Neil Close	Pilot Officer	Royal Air Force	EGM	21 December 1937	—
Anthony John Cobham	Midshipman	Royal Navy	EGM	1 January 1930	—
Dennis Arthur Copperwheat	Lieutenant	Royal Navy, HMS Penelope	GC	17 November 1942	—
John Guise Cowley	Lieutenant	British Army, Royal Engineers	AM	19 November 1935	—
Frederick John Cradock	Boilerman	—	GC	10 September 1943*	—
Bert Craig	—	—	EM	1 June 1923	—
Bertram Frederick Crosby	—	—	EM	15 May 1928	—
Edwin Crossley	—	—	EGM	25 February 1936	—
Matthew Croucher**	Lance Corporal	40 Commando, Royal Marines Reserve	GC	24 July 2008	
Peter Victor Danckwerts	Sub-Lieutenant	Royal Naval Reserve	GC	20 December 1940	
Richard Edward Darker	Miner	Bentley Colliery	EM	30 September 1932	—
Frederick Davies	Fireman	National Fire Service	GC	5 February 1946*	—
Robert Davies	Lieutenant (temporary)	Royal Engineers	GC	30 September 1940	—
Thomas Neil Davis	Leading Seaman	Royal Naval Reserve	AM	23 March 1918	—
Harry Melville Arbuthnot Day	Lieutenant (acting)	Royal Marine Light Infantry	AM	7 January 1919	
Richard Deedes	Captain	King's Shropshire Light Infantry	EGM	8 May 1934	—
Hubert Dinwoodie	Squadron Leader	Royal Air Force Volunteer Reserve	GC	4 February 1947	—
Ditto Ram	Sowar	Central India Horse	GC	13 December 1945*	—
John Dixon	—	—	EM	23 February 1940	—
Albert George Dolphin	Porter	South Eastern Hospital, London	GC	17 January 1941*	—
Raymond Tasman Donoghue	Tram Driver	Metropolitan Transport Trust, Hobart, Tasmania	GC	11 October 1960*	Raymond Donoghue
Robert Ewing Douglas	Leading Aircraftman	Royal Air Force	EGM	27 March 1931	—
John Noel Dowland	Squadron Leader	Royal Air Force	GC	7 January 1941	
Baptista Joseph D'Souza	Shri	—	EGM	3 June 1931	—
Charles Godfrey Duffin	Senior Shipwright Diver	HM Dockyard, Portsmouth	EGM	1 February 1937	—
Charles Alfred Duncan	Private	4th Battalion, Parachute Regiment	GC	9 November 1943*	—
Mahmood Khan Durrani	Captain	1st Bahawalpur Infantry, British Indian Army	GC	23 May 1946	—
William Marsden Eastman	Lieutenant	Royal Army Ordnance Corps	GC	24 December 1940	—
Jack Maynard Cholmondeley Easton	Sub-Lieutenant	Royal Naval Volunteer Reserve	GC	23 January 1941	—
Arthur Frederick Edwards	Acting Bombardier	British Army	EM	22 January 1918	—
Reginald Vincent Ellingworth	Chief Petty Officer	HMS Vernon	GC	20 December 1940*	—
Bernard George Ellis	Lieutenant	British Army	AM	18 July 1919	—
Ernest Matthew Elston	Private	British Army	EGM	19 November 1935	—
Errol John Emanuel	District Commissioner	Territory of Papua New Guinea	GC	1 February 1972*	—
Harry Errington	Fireman	London Auxiliary Fire Service	GC	8 August 1941	—
David Hywel Evans	Sub-Lieutenant	Royal Naval Volunteer Reserve	AM	31 January 1919	—
John Fairclough	Gunner	British Army	AM	8 May 1928	—
Frederick William Fairfax	Detective Constable	Metropolitan Police Force	GC	6 January 1953	—
John Henry Farr	—	—	EGM	26 July 1940	—
Kenneth Farrow	Constable	Cardiff City Police Force	AM	15 October 1948	—
Francis Anthony Blair Fasson	Lieutenant	HMS Petard, Royal Navy	GC	14 September 1943*	—
Rashid Abdul Fattah	Rais	Trans-Jordan Frontier Force	EGM	12 July 1938	—
Christopher Feetham	Fireman	merchant seaman	AM	18 March 1919	—
Christopher Finney**	Trooper	Blues and Royals	GC	31 October 2003	—
Bernard Fisher	—	—	EM	15 August 1939	—
William George Fleming	Coxswain	Gorleston Lifeboat	EGM	30 June 1924	
Donald Fletcher	—	—	EM	26 January 1926	—
Henry Harwood Flintoff	Farm labourer	—	EM	8 December 1944	—
Albert Ford	Sergeant	British Army	AM	21 August 1917	—
Douglas Ford	Captain (acting)	Royal Scots	GC	18 April 1946*	—
William George Foster	Lieutenant	7th Wiltshire Battalion, Home Guard	GC	27 November 1942*	—
Leslie Owen Fox	Deputy Party Leader	London County Council Heavy Rescue Service	GC	20 February 1945	—
Harriet Elizabeth Fraser	Staff Nurse	Territorial Force Nursing Service	AM	31 January 1919	—
John Alexander Fraser	Assistant Attorney General	Hong Kong Colonial Service	GC	29 October 1946*	John Fraser
Ernest Ralph Clyde Frost	Aircraftman 1st Class	Royal Air Force	EGM	5 July 1940	—
Mohi-ud-Din Ghulam	Sub-Inspector	Punjab Police	EGM	3 June 1931	—
John Edward Gibbons	Temporary Lieutenant	Royal Naval Volunteer Reserve	AM	11 August 1942	—
Stanley Frederick Gibbs	—	—	AM	8 February 1927	Stanley Frederick Gibbs
Michael Gibson	Sergeant	Royal Engineers	GC	22 January 1941*	—
Ernest Oliver Gidden	Lieutenant	Royal Naval Volunteer Reserve	GC	9 June 1942	—
Ivor John Gillett	Aircraftman 1st Class	Royal Air Force	GC	3 October 1950*	—
Benjamin Gimbert	Driver	London and North Eastern Railway	GC	25 July 1944	—
Anthony John Gledhill**	Police Constable	Metropolitan Police Force	GC	23 May 1967	—
Roger Philip Goad	Captain (Explosives Officer)	Metropolitan Police Force	GC	1 October 1976*	—
William Goad	Leading Seaman	Royal Navy	AM	26 January 1943	—
Abdus Samad Abdul Wahid Golandaz	—	—	EGM	4 June 1934	
Leon Verdi Goldsworthy	Lieutenant	HMS Vernon, Royal Australian Naval Volunteer Reserve	GC	19 September 1944	Leon Goldsworthy
George Herbert Goodman	Lieutenant	HMS Vernon, Royal Naval Volunteer Reserve	GC	15 September 1942	—
John Ingram Gough	—	—	EM	17 June 1930	—
George Gosse	Lieutenant	HMS Vernon, Royal Australian Naval Volunteer Reserve	GC	30 April 1946	George Gosse
Reginald Cubitt Graveley	Flg Off.	Royal Air Force	EGM	11 November 1939	—
Karl Mander Gravell	Leading Aircraftman	Royal Canadian Air Force	GC	11 June 1942*	—
Hector Bertram Gray	Flight Lieutenant	Royal Air Force	GC	19 April 1946*	—
Roderick Borden Gray	Flying Officer	Royal Canadian Air Force	GC	13 March 1945*	Cy Gray
Colin Grazier	Able Seaman	HMS Petard, Royal Navy	GC	14 September 1943*	
John Sedgwick Gregson	Apprentice	merchant seaman	AM	2 February 1943	—
Stewart Graeme Guthrie	Sergeant	New Zealand Police	GC	19 December 1991*	
Kevin Howard Haberfield**	Colour Sergeant	Royal Marines	GC	31 July 2015	—
Fred Haller	—	—	EM	20 January 1939	—
William George Hand	Sergeant	British Army	EGM	2 June 1923	—
Benjamin Gower Hardy	Private	22nd Australian Garrison Battalion	GC	1 September 1950*	Ben Hardy
Charles Thomas Harris	Acting Sergeant	British Army	EM	22 January 1918	—
Roy Thomas Harris	Staff Officer	Air Raid Precautions	GC	17 December 1940	—
Barbara Jane Harrison	Air Stewardess	British Overseas Airways Corporation	GC	8 August 1969*	
George Willet Harrison	Able Seaman	Royal Navy	EGM	1 January 1931	—
Leonard Henry Harrison	Civilian Armament Instructor	Air Ministry	GC	3 January 1941	—
Harrie Stephen Harwood	Air Mechanic Ist Class	Royal Flying Corps	AM	19 May 1916	—
Percy Roberts Havercroft	Colliery Worker	—	EM	22 June 1917	—
Eynon Hawkins	Able Seaman	Royal Navy	AM	29 June 1943	—
David George Montagu Hay	Cadet	Royal Naval Reserve	AM	8 July 1941	—
El Amin Effendi Hemeida	Yuzbashi	Sudan Defence Force	EGM	23 June 1936	—
Albert Edward Heming	Section Leader	Civil Defence Rescue Service	GC	17 July 1945	—
George Campbell Henderson	Sub-Officer	Gibraltar Dockyard Fire Service	GC	20 November 1951*	
Herbert Reuben Henderson	—	—	EGM	3 May 1927	—
James Hendry	Corporal	Royal Canadian Engineers	GC	2 April 1943*	
George Henshaw	Lance Corporal	British Army	EGM	19 November 1935	—
George Christopher Heslop	Mine Manager	Loftus Ironstone Mine	EM	26 May 1936	—
William Ewart Hiscock	Lieutenant Commander	HMS St Angelo, Royal Navy	GC	16 June 1942*	—
Alexander Mitchell Hodge	Sub-Lieutenant	Royal Naval Volunteer Reserve	EGM	2 August 1940	—
Vivian Hollowday	Aircraftman First Class	Royal Air Force	GC	21 January 1941	Bob Hollowday
Kenneth Horsfield	Corporal	Manchester Regiment (attached Special Air Service)	GC	23 March 1945*	Kenneth Horsfield
Albert Howarth	Ordinary Seaman	Royal Navy	AM	2 September 1941	—
Murray Ken Hudson	Sergeant	Royal New Zealand Infantry Regiment	GC	11 October 1974*	
Joseph Hughes	Driver	Royal Army Service Corps	GC	26 June 1947*	—
Kim Spencer Hughes**	Staff Sergeant	Royal Logistic Corps	GC	19 March 2010	—
Thomas Hulme	—	—	EM	16 May 1941	—
Patrick Noel Humphreys	Lieutenant	Royal Navy	EGM	12 November 1937	—
John Hutchinson	—	—	EM	20 July 1948	—
Albert James Hutchison	Sergeant	British Army	AM	4 January 1918	—
Taha Idris	Shawish	Blue Nile Province Police	EGM	2 March 1934	—
George Walter Inwood	Section Commander	30th Warwickshire Battalion, Home Guard	GC	27 May 1941*	
Islam-ud-Din	Lance Naik	9th Jat Regiment, British Indian Army	GC	5 October 1945*	—
Thomas Jameson	—	—	EM	8 October 1940	—
William Jamieson	—	—	EGM	23 June 1936	—
Robert Llewellyn Jephson-Jones	Captain	Royal Army Ordnance Corps	GC	24 December 1940	—
Barry Johnson**	Warrant Officer Class 1	British Army – Royal Army Ordnance Corps	GC	6 November 1990	—
James Johnston	Overseer	Mohpani Coal Mine, India	EM	19 March 1926	—
Richard Frank Jolly	Commander	Royal Navy	EGM	23 December 1939*	—
Benjamin Littler Jones	—	—	EM	9 September 1938	—
Ralph Jones	Private	22nd Australian Garrison Battalion	GC	1 September 1950*	Ralph Jones
Robert Murray Kavanaugh	—	—	AM	16 October 1930	
Cecil Francis Kelly	Assistant River Surveyor	Port Commissioners, Calcutta, Bengal	EGM	1 February 1937	—
Thomas Raymond Kelly	Able Seaman	Merchant Navy	GC	10 February 1948*	—
André Gilbert Kempster	Major	Royal Armoured Corps	GC	9 November 1943*	
James Stirratt Topping Kennedy	Security Guard	British Rail Engineering Limited	GC	15 August 1975*	—
Ernest William Kent	—	—	EM	20 December 1938	—
Michael Sullivan Keogh	Chief Petty Officer	Royal Naval Air Service	AM	14 January 1916	—
Muhammad Khalifa	Acting Shawish	Berber Province Police	EGM	29 September 1925	—
Noor Inayat Khan	Assistant Section Officer, WAAF; Ensign, FANY	Special Operations Executive	GC	5 April 1949*	Noor Khan
Derek Godfrey Kinne	Fusilier	Royal Northumberland Fusiliers	GC	13 April 1954	—
Richard Henry King	—	—	EM	20 October 1931	—
Kirpa Ram	Naik	Frontier Force Regiment, British Indian Army	GC	15 March 1946*	—
Richard John Knowlton	Ordinary Seaman	Royal Navy	AM	12 December 1917	—
Simmon Latutin	Captain	Somerset Light Infantry	GC	10 September 1946*	—
Walter Holroyd Lee	—	—	EM	10 May 1949	—
Raymond Mayhew Lewin	Sergeant	Royal Air Force Volunteer Reserve	GC	11 March 1941	—
Robert Stead Little	—	—	EM	5 May 1939	—
William Lloyd	—	—	EM	9 December 1927	—
George Locke	—	—	EM	2 March 1926	—
John Niven Angus Low	Lieutenant	Royal Navy	EGM	16 August 1940*	—
Alfred Raymond Lowe**	Boy 1st Class	Royal Navy	AM	8 February 1949	—
Alfred Lungley	Lance Sergeant	British Army	EGM	19 November 1935	—
Joseph Lynch	Chief Petty Officer	Royal Navy	AM	15 June 1948	—
Horace William Madden	Private	Royal Australian Regiment	GC	30 December 1955*	Bill Madden
Herbert John Mahoney	Petty Officer	Royal Navy	EGM	23 December 1927	—
Reginald Harry Maltby	Staff Sgt	Royal Tank Corps	EGM	3 July 1926	—
Thomas George Manwaring	—	—	EM	1 November 1949	—
Frederick Hamilton March	—	—	EGM	5 December 1924	
Cyril Arthur Joseph Martin	Major	Royal Engineers	GC	11 March 1943	—
Dudley William Mason	Captain	Merchant Navy	GC	8 September 1942	Dudley Mason
Mata Din	Lance-Naik	Indian Army	EGM	19 November 1935	—
Lionel Colin Matthews	Captain	Royal Australian Corps of Signals	GC	28 November 1947*	Lionel Matthews
Alexander Henry Maxwell-Hyslop	Lieutenant Commander	Royal Navy	AM	11 November 1929	—
Phillip Robert Stephen May	Leading Seaman	Royal Navy	AM	25 November 1947	—
William Simpson McAloney	Aircraftman	Royal Australian Air Force	AM	18 February 1938	
Thomas McAvoy	Private	British Army	EGM	25 July 1939	—
John McCabe	—	—	EM	13 June 1919	—
John McCabe	—	—	EGM	31 May 1940*	—
William Henry Debonnaire McCarthy	Boatswain	Royal Navy	AM	27 July 1943	—
John McIntosh McClymont	Corporal	Royal Air Force	EGM	19 July 1940	—
Thomas William McCormack	—	—	AM	23 July 1909	—
William Neil McKechnie	FltCadet	Royal Air Force	EGM	18 October 1929	—
Thomas Patrick McTeague	Corporal	Royal Air Force	EGM	12 April 1929	—
Albert John Meadows	—	—	EM	29 December 1931	—
Arthur Douglas Merriman	Experimental Officer	Ministry of Supply	GC	3 December 1940	—
Alfred Miles	Able Seaman	Royal Navy	AM	29 April 1941	—
Leonard John Miles	Air Raid Warden	Air Raid Precautions	GC	17 January 1941*	—
Henry James Miller	Able Seaman	Royal Navy	EGM	16 August 1940*	—
John Bryan Peter Miller	Sub-Lieutenant	Royal Naval Volunteer Reserve	GC	14 January 1941	—
Thomas Frank Miller	Private	British Army	EGM	2 June 1923	—
Ahmed Muhammad Mirghany	—	—	EGM	2 January 1933	—
John Henry Mitchell	Acting 2nd Hand	Royal Naval Reserve	AM	29 April 1941	—
Richard Valentine Moore	Sub-Lieutenant (temporary)	Royal Naval Volunteer Reserve	GC	27 December 1940	—
Alfred Ernest Morris	—	—	EM	4 July 1924	—
Francis Austin Morteshed	Constable	Royal Ulster Constabulary	EGM	3 June 1924	—
William Radenhurst Mosedale	Fireman	City of Birmingham Fire Brigade	GC	28 March 1941	—
Brandon Moss	Special Constable	Coventry Constabulary	GC	13 December 1940	
Joseph Edward Mott	Private	British Army	EGM	25 February 1938	—
John Stuart Mould	Lieutenant	Royal Australian Naval Reserve attached HMS Vernon	GC	3 November 1942	John Mould
Eric Lawrence Moxey	Squadron Leader	Royal Air Force Volunteer Reserve	GC	17 December 1940*	
Muhammad Abdulla Muhammad	Nafar	Khartoum Police Force	EGM	12 December 1924	—
Michael Joseph Munnelly	Journalist	The People	GC	29 June 1965*	—
Robert Laurence Nairac	Captain	Grenadier Guards	GC	13 February 1979*	
Nandlal Thapa	Naik	British Indian Army – 8th Gurkha Rifles	EGM	19 November 1935	—
Frank Naughton	Private	British Army – Royal Tank Corps	EGM	1 February 1937	—
Ibrahim Negib	Sol	Khartoum Police Force	EGM	12 December 1924	—
Harold Reginald Newgass	Lieutenant	Royal Naval Volunteer Reserve	GC	4 March 1941	
Alfred William Newman	Acting Mate	Royal Navy	AM	1 March 1918	—
Lanceray Arthur Newnham	Colonel (temporary)	The Middlesex Regiment (Duke of Cambridge's Own)	GC	18 April 1946*	—
Arthur Frederick Crane Nicholls	Brigadier	Special Operations Executive	GC	1 March 1946*	—
James William Nightall	Fireman	London and North Eastern Railway	GC	25 July 1944*	—
George Paterson Niven	Able Seaman	Royal Navy	EGM	1 January 1930	—
Frank Emery Nix	—	—	EM	21 November 1944	—
Peter Allen Norton**	Captain	British Army – Royal Logistic Corps	GC	23 March 2006	Peter Norton, 2013
Patrick Albert O'Leary (Albert-Marie Edmond Guérrise)	Lieutenant-Commander	Special Operations Executive	GC	5 November 1946	Pat O'Leary (Albert-Marie Guérrise)
Wallace Arnold Oakes	Driver	British Rail	GC	19 October 1965*	—
Leo Francis O'Hagen	Explosive Worker	Royal Gunpowder Factory	EGM	6 February 1940	—
Dick Oliver	Leading Seaman	Royal Navy	AM	2 August 1928	—
Edward Omara	—	—	EGM	9 October 1934	—
Samuel Orr	SpHd.Cons	Ulster Special Constabulary	EGM	3 June 1924	—
Albert Matthew Osborne	Leading Aircraftman	Royal Air Force Volunteer Reserve	GC	10 July 1942*	
John Michael O'Shea	Reverend	—	EGM	30 June 1924	—
Edward Donald J. Parker	Pilot Officer	Royal Air Force Volunteer Reserve	EGM	6 August 1940	—
Graham Leslie Parish	Sergeant	Royal Air Force Volunteer Reserve	GC	2 April 1943*	—
John MacMillan Stevenson Patton	Lieutenant	Royal Canadian Engineers	GC	17 December 1940	—
Joan Daphne Mary Pearson	Corporal	Women's Auxiliary Air Force	EGM	19 July 1940	
Robert Pearson	—	—	EM	20 October 1925	—
Pir Khan	Subedar-Major	Indian Army	EGM	28 June 1940	—
James Pollitt	—	—	EM	17 April 1936	—
Michael Kenneth Pratt**	Constable	Victoria Police	GC	4 July 1978	—
Rev. Herbert Cecil Pugh	Squadron Leader	Royal Air Force Volunteer Reserve	GC	1 April 1947*	
James Sidney Purvis	—	—	EM	22 November 1929	—
John Alan Quinton	Flight Lieutenant	Royal Air Force	GC	23 October 1951*	John Quinton
Geoffrey Rackham	2nd Lieutenant	British Army	AM	3 January 1919	—
Abdul Rahman	Havildar	9th Jat Regiment, British Indian Army	GC	10 September 1946*	—
Rangit Singh	Babu	—	EGM	1 January 1935	—
Henry Herbert Reed	Bombardier	Royal Artillery	GC	23 September 1941*	—
James Arthur Reeves	Chief Officer	merchant seaman	AM	25 May 1943	—
John Rennie	Sergeant	The Argyll and Sutherland Highlanders of Canada (Princess Louise's)	GC	26 May 1944*	John Rennie
Edward Womersley Reynolds	Lieutenant	British Army	EGM	17 September 1940	—
William Ernest Rhoades	Sergeant	Royal Flying Corps	AM	1 January 1918	—
Richard Walter Richards	—	—	AM	6 July 1923	—
Gerald Irving Richardson	Superintendent	Lancashire Constabulary	GC	14 November 1972*	—
Randolph Gordon Ridling	Lieutenant	New Zealand Army	AM	9 December 1919	—
Geoffrey Riley	—	—	AM	3 October 1944	—
Reginald Rimmer	Sergeant	Bombay Police Force	EGM	3 June 1931	—
Paul Douglas Robertson	Acting Flight Commander	Royal Naval Air Service	AM	18 June 1918	—
Harry Robinson	—	—	EM	20 July 1948	—
George David Rodriques	AsstSurgeon	Indian Army	EGM	2 June 1923	—
Jonathan Rogers	Chief Petty Officer	Royal Australian Navy	GC	19 March 1965*	Jonathan Rogers
Sydney George Rogerson	Staff Sergeant (acting)	Royal Army Ordnance Corps	GC	11 October 1946	—
Arthur Dwight Ross	Air Commodore	Royal Canadian Air Force	GC	27 October 1944	Dwight Ross
John Samuel Rowlands	Wing Commander	Royal Air Force Volunteer Reserve	GC	10 August 1943	
David Russell	Lance-Corporal	22nd Battalion (New Zealand)	GC	24 December 1948*	—
Richard John Hammersley Ryan	Lieutenant-Commander	HMS President	GC	20 December 1940*	—
Odette Sansom	—	Special Operations Executive	GC	20 August 1946	Odette Hallowes (prev. Sansom)
Robert Benjamin Saunders	Doctor	—	EM	19 August 1937	—
Carl Mallinson Schofield	—	—	EM	8 October 1940	—
Olaf Sean George Schmid	Staff Sergeant	Royal Logistic Corps	GC	19 March 2010*	—
James Patrick Scully	Corporal (acting)	Pioneer Corps	GC	8 July 1941	James Scully
Hugh Paul Seagrim	Major	Special Operations Executive	GC	12 September 1946*	—
Stanley William Sewell	Explosive Worker	Royal Gunpowder Factory	EGM	6 February 1940	—
Joseph Shanley	—	—	EM	20 July 1948	—
Samuel Shephard**	Lieutenant	Royal Marines	GC	3 October 2014	—
John William Hersey Shepherd	—	—	EM	14 February 1930	—
Joseph Henry Silk	Private	Somerset Light Infantry	GC	13 June 1944*	—
Laurence Frank Sinclair	Wing Commander	Royal Air Force	GC	21 January 1941	—
Charles Smith	—	—	EM	28 June 1940	—
Anthony Smith	Member	Civil Defence Rescue Service	GC	30 May 1944	
Kenneth Smith	Signalman	Royal Corps of Signals	GC	19 October 1945*	—
Oliver Soulsby	Miner	Bentley Colliery	EM	30 September 1932	—
Bennett Southwell	Ordinary Seaman	HMS Vernon	GC	23 January 1941*	—
Brian Spillett	Detail fitter	—	GC	29 June 1965*	—
Kenneth Gerald Spooner	Leading Aircraftman	Royal Canadian Air Force	GC	7 January 1944*	Kenneth Spooner
Robert Spoors	Private	British Army – West Yorkshire Regiment	AM	19 November 1935	—
John George Stanners	Deck Hand	Royal Naval Reserve	AM	16 May 1918	—
Henry William Stevens	Police Constable	Metropolitan Police	GC	21 October 1958	—
James Ernest Stewart	Lieutenant Colonel	British Army	EGM	26 June 1928	—
John Stoves	Principal Officer	HM Prison Service	EGM	23 October 1928	—
George Preston Stronach	Chief Officer	Merchant Navy	GC	23 November 1943	—
Stephen George Styles	Major	British Army – Royal Army Ordnance Corps	GC	11 January 1972	—
Subramanian	Subedar	Queen Victoria's Own Madras Miners & Sappers	GC	30 June 1944*	—
Charles Howard, 20th Earl of Suffolk	Chief Field Research and Experimental Officer	Ministry of Supply	GC	18 July 1941*	Charles Howard, 20th Earl of Suffolk
Frank Sykes	Miner	Bentley Colliery	EM	30 September 1932	—
William George Sylvester	Explosive Worker	Royal Gunpowder Factory	EGM	6 February 1940	—
Hugh Randall Syme	Lieutenant	Royal Australian Naval Volunteer Reserve	GC	3 August 1943	Hugh Syme
Violette Reine Elizabeth Szabo	Lieutenant, FANY	Special Operations Executive	GC	17 December 1946*	Violette Szabo
El Jak Effendi Taha	Shawish	Khartoum Police Force	EGM	12 December 1924	—
Ellis Edward Arthur Chetwynd Talbot	2nd Lieutenant	British Army	EGM	17 September 1940	—
Charles William Tandy-Green	—	—	EGM	19 June 1934	—
George Anthony Morgan Taylor	Volcanologist	Commonwealth Bureau of Mineral Resources	GC	22 April 1952	Tony Taylor
Patrick Gordon Taylor	Captain	—	EGM	9 July 1937	Patrick Taylor
Robert George Taylor	Newspaper advertising representative	—	GC	1 August 1950*	Bob Taylor
William Horace Taylor	Sub-Lieutenant	Royal Naval Volunteer Reserve	GC	14 January 1941	—
Samuel Jarrett Temperley	Assistant Surveyor	Bentley Colliery	EM	30 September 1932	—
Arthur Devere Thomas	—	—	EM	31 March 1931	—
Dorothy Louise Thomas	—	—	EGM	2 March 1934	—
Thomas Thomas	—	—	EM	6 February 1934	—
Jenkin Robert Oswald Thompson	Captain	Royal Army Medical Corps	GC	2 February 1945*	—
Matthew Thompson	—	—	EM	28 June 1940	—
Anthony Henry Hamilton Tollemache	Flg Off.	Royal Air Force	EGM	6 August 1940	—
Emma Jose Townsend	—	—	EGM	6 September 1932	—
Frederick Henry Troake	Private	British Army	EGM	2 June 1923	—
Dominic Charles Troulan**	Security Consultant	—	GC	16 June 2017	—
Stephen John Tuckwell	Able Seaman	Royal Navy	GC	14 January 1941	—
Norman Tunna	Shunter	Great Western Railway	GC	24 January 1941	
Geoffrey Gledhill Turner	Lieutenant	Royal Naval Volunteer Reserve	GC	27 June 1941	—
James Gordon Melville Turner	Radio Officer	merchant seaman	EGM	13 October 1939	—
Cyril James Tutton	—	—	EGM	18 March 1927	—
Albert Tyler	—	—	EM	14 February 1930	—
Margaret Vaughan (Purves)	—	—	AM	1 November 1949	—
Carl Walker	Constable	Lancashire Constabulary	GC	14 November 1972	—
Charles Henry Walker	Petty Officer	Royal Navy	AM	15 December 1942	—
Eric William Kevin Walton	Temporary Lieutenant	Royal Navy	AM	8 June 1948	—
Granville Charles Wastie	—	—	EM	6 June 1930	—
Albert Waterfield	—	—	EGM	30 December 1922	—
Terence Edward Waters	Lieutenant	British Army – West Yorkshire Regiment	GC	13 April 1954*	—
William Waterson	—	—	EM	2 April 1946	—
Victor Albert Watson	Flight Lieutenant	Royal Naval Air Service	AM	8 March 1918	—
Eric Watt-Bonar	Flight Sergeant	Royal Air Force Volunteer Reserve	EGM	5 August 1932	—
John Weller	—	—	EM	9 June 1944	—
Percy Barnard Weller	—	—	EM	24 October 1941	—
David Charles Western	—	—	AM	13 August 1948	—
Thomas Atkinson Whitehead	—	—	EM	5 September 1922	—
Charles Wilcox	—	—	EM	30 September 1949	—
Robert Wild	—	—	EGM	22 October 1926	—
Michael Willetts	Sergeant	British Army – Parachute Regiment	GC	25 May 1971*	—
Osmond Williams	—	—	EM	29 November 1932	—
Sidney Williams	Lance Corporal	British Army	AM	30 August 1918	—
Harry Wilson	—	—	EM	22 August 1924	—
Sidney Noel Wiltshire	Pilot Officer	Royal Air Force	EGM	31 January 1930	—
Gerald Winter	—	—	EGM	28 June 1940	—
Hilda Elizabeth Wolsey	—	—	AM	28 March 1911	—
Stanley James Woodbridge	Flight Sergeant	Royal Air Force Volunteer Reserve	GC	28 September 1948*	—
Ernest Alfred Wooding	Warrant Officer	Royal Canadian Naval Volunteer Reserve	AM	13 April 1945	—
Mark Wright	Corporal	3rd Battalion, Parachute Regiment	GC	15 December 2006*	
George Cameron Wyllie	Sapper	Royal Engineers	GC	30 September 1940	—
Ahmed Yar	Havildar	British Army	EGM	19 November 1935	—
Philip William Yates	Miner	Bentley Colliery	EM	30 September 1932	—
El Imam Yehia	Constable	Khartoum Police Force	EGM	1 January 1932	—
Forest Frederick Edward Yeo-Thomas	Wing Commander	Royal Air Force Volunteer Reserve	GC	15 February 1946	—
Archibald Young	—	—	EM	1 January 1917	—
St John Graham Young	Lieutenant	The Central India Horse (21st King George V's Own Horse)	GC	20 July 1945*	—
William Younger	—	—	EM	20 July 1948	—

List of 407 individual George Cross recipients with note whether original or exchange award. The three collective are not listed.

== Group awards ==
By express instruction of King George VI, the Island of Malta has been awarded the George Cross collectively in perpetuity. In a letter to Malta's Governor (Lieutenant-General Sir William Dobbie) dated 15 April 1942, King George VI awarded the George Cross "to the Island Fortress of Malta to bear witness to a heroism and devotion that will long be famous in history". Dobbie replied: "By God's help Malta will not weaken but will endure until victory is won."

In a similar manner, Queen Elizabeth II awarded the Royal Ulster Constabulary the George Cross on 23 November 1999. Buckingham Palace announced that it was awarded "to honour the courage and dedication of the officers of the Royal Ulster Constabulary and their families who have shared their hardship". Queen Elizabeth II presented it in person at Hillsborough Castle, County Down. On 4 November 2001, the Royal Ulster Constabulary was reorganised and renamed as the Police Service of Northern Ireland with most former RUC officers remaining in the new organisation .

On 5 July 2021, on the 73rd anniversary of the NHS, and during the global COVID-19 pandemic, the Queen awarded the George Cross to the National Health Service staff of the United Kingdom. The Queen wrote in a personal message: "It is with great pleasure, on behalf of a grateful nation, that I award the George Cross to the National Health Services of the United Kingdom. This award recognises all NHS staff, past and present, across all disciplines and all four nations. Over more than seven decades, and especially in recent times, you have supported the people of our country with courage, compassion and dedication, demonstrating the highest standards of public service. You have our enduring thanks and heartfelt appreciation. Elizabeth R."

== See also ==
- List of Australian George Cross recipients
- Lists of Victoria Cross recipients
- British and Commonwealth orders and decorations
