= Memorial Gates, London =

Memorial to Commonwealth soldiers of the two World Wars

Memorial Gates
- United Kingdom
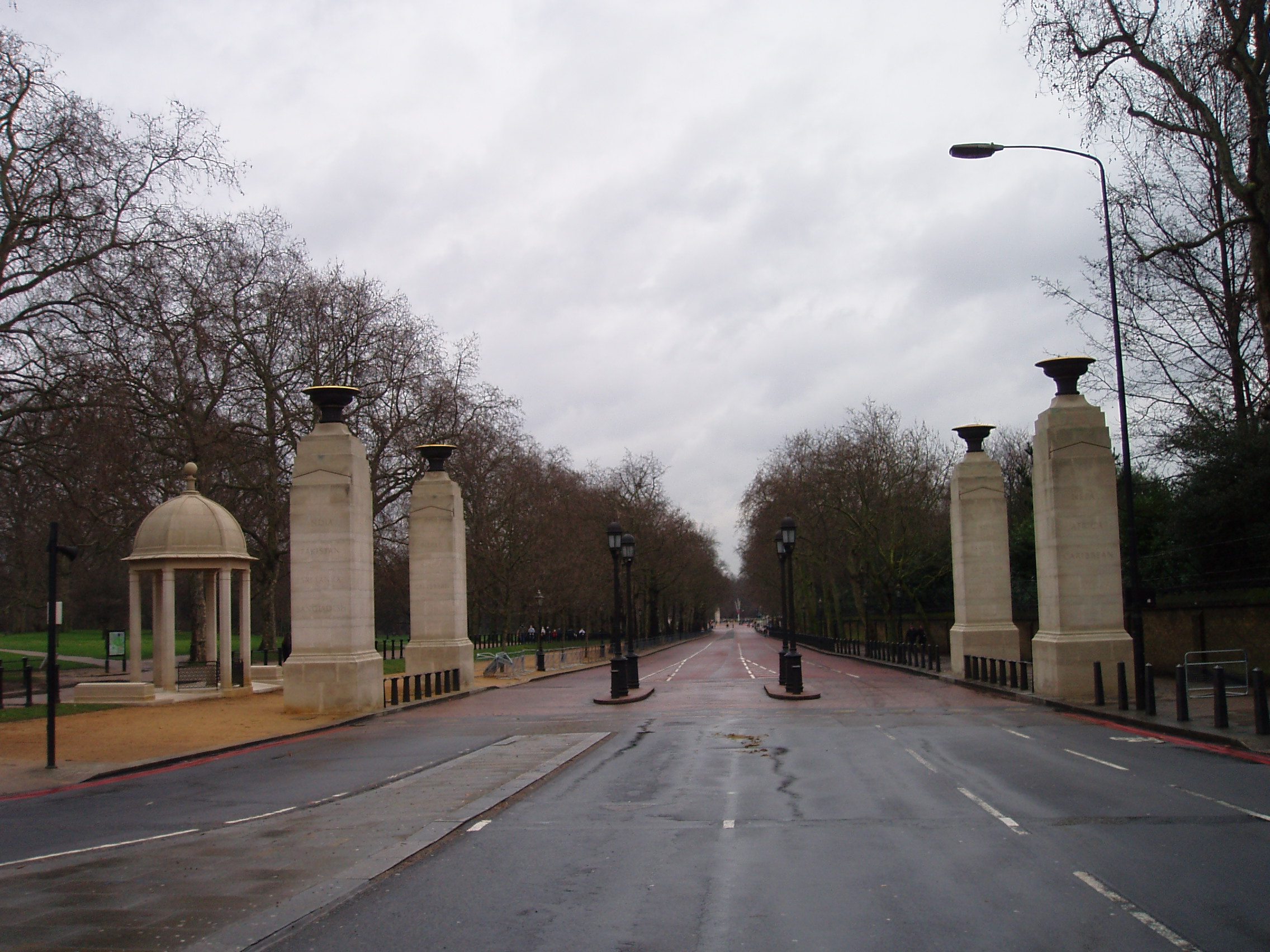
- For soldiers from the Indian subcontinent, the Caribbean and Africa who fought for Britain in World War I and II
- Unveiled: 6 November 2002; 24 years ago
- Location: 51.5025°N 0.1491°W; Constitution Hill, London
- Designed by: Liam O'Connor

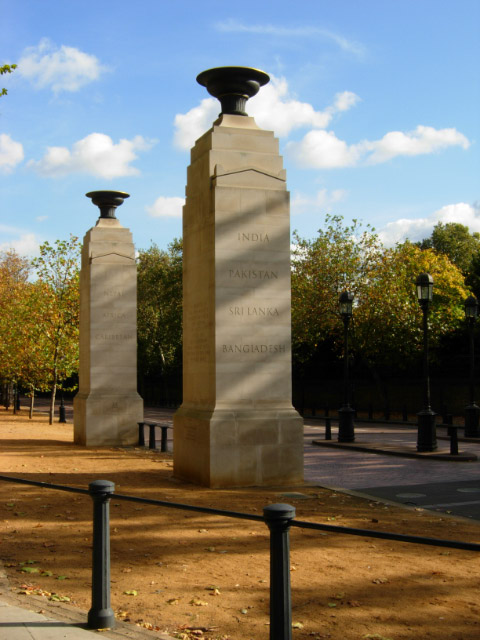
Two of the gate piers

The Memorial Gates are a war memorial located at the Hyde Park Corner end of Constitution Hill in London. Also known as the Commonwealth Memorial Gates, they commemorate the soldiers of the British Empire from five countries of the Indian subcontinent (India, Pakistan, Bangladesh, Nepal and Sri Lanka), as well as the countries of Africa and the Caribbean, who served for Britain in the First and Second World Wars.

The memorial, designed by architect Liam O'Connor, was inaugurated in 2002 by Queen Elizabeth II.

== Inscriptions ==
The main inscription reads:

In memory of the five million volunteers from the Indian sub-continent, Africa and the Caribbean who fought with Britain in the two World Wars.

A shorter inscription quotes the words of the Nigerian author and poet Ben Okri:

Our Future is Greater Than Our Past.

== Campaign stones ==
On the Green Park side of the Gates there are two stone slabs, either side of the pavilion, commemorating by name several of the campaigns in which forces from the British Empire fought.

World War I

- West Africa (West Africa Campaign)
- Egypt (Sinai and Palestine Campaign)
- East Africa (East African Campaign)
- France (Western Front)
- Belgium (Western Front)
- Gallipoli (Gallipoli Campaign)
- Russia (Caucasus Campaign)

World War II

- India (Operation U-Go)
- Burma (Burma Campaign)
- Malaya (Battle of Malaya)
- Singapore (Battle of Singapore)
- Persia (Anglo-Soviet invasion of Iran)
- Hong Kong (Battle of Hong Kong)
- Dutch East Indies (Dutch East Indies Campaign)

== Memorial pavilion ==
The memorial pavilion, also on the Green Park side of Constitution Hill has a list of those from the named regions who were awarded the George Cross (GC) or Victoria Cross (VC) in the two World Wars. The 74 names are listed on the ceiling of the small domed pavilion. There are 23 VC recipients from World War I listed, 12 GC recipients from World War II, and 39 VC recipients from World War II.

=== World War I Victoria Crosses ===
- Lala
- J. G. Smyth
- J. A. Sinton
- F. A. de Pass
- J. F. P. Butler
- W. H. Hewitt
- Kulbir Thapa
- W. A. McC. Bruce
- G. G. M. Wheeler
- Khudadad Khan
- Gabbar Singh Negi
- Karanbahadur Rana
- Mir Dast
- E. Jotham
- F. C. Booth
- W. F. Faulds
- Badlu Singh
- G. C. Wheeler
- Chatta Singh
- Gobind Singh
- W. A. Bloomfield
- Shahamad Khan
- Darwan Singh Negi

=== World War II George Crosses ===
- Pir Khan
- S. Latutin
- Kirpa Ram
- Ditto Ram
- St J. G. Young
- H. P. Seagrim
- Islam-ud-Din
- Subramanian
- Abdul Rehman
- Matreen Ahmed Ansari
- Mahmood Khan Durrani
- Noor-un-Nisa Inayat-Khan

=== World War II Victoria Crosses ===
- Ali Haidar
- G. R. Norton
- Nand Singh
- Chhelu Ram
- E. C. T. Wilson
- Richpal Ram
- A. E. Cumming
- Namdeo Jadhao
- Ram Sarup Singh
- Parkash Singh
- Bhanbhagta Gurung
- Netrabahadur Thapa
- Premindra Singh Bhagat
- E. Swales
- Sher Shah
- N. G. Leakey
- Gaje Ghale
- M. Allmand
- Abdul Hafiz
- Agansing Rai
- Bhandari Ram
- Thaman Gurung
- Parkash Singh
- Yeshwant Ghadge
- Sherbahadur Thapa
- Sefanaia Sukanaivalu
- Fazal Din
- F. G. Blaker
- Gian Singh
- Kamal Ram
- C. Raymond
- Ganju Lama
- Umrao Singh
- J. D. Nettleton
- Q. G. M. Smythe
- Tul Bahadur Pun
- Lalbahadur Thapa
- Lachhiman Gurung
- Karamjeet Singh Judge

== Planning, construction and inauguration ==
The plans for the memorial were made by the Memorial Gates Trust. As inscribed on the memorial, the inaugural patron of the Trust was Prince Charles, and the inaugural trustees were Lord Inge, Lord Sandberg, Viscount Slim, Neil Thorne, Lord Weatherill, Baroness Flather, Khalid Aziz, Lakshmi Niwas Mittal, Harpinder Singh Narula (chair), Gulam Noon, and Anwar Pervez.

The architects were Liam O'Connor Architects and Planning Consultants. Funding came from the National Lottery, provided by the Millennium Commission. Construction of the Memorial Gates began on 1 August 2001, with an inscription commemorating this event on the first stone to be laid; the inscription states that the stone was laid by the Queen Mother. The company contracted to build the memorial was Geoffrey Osborne Ltd and the stonemasons were CWO Ltd.

The pillars are made from Portland Stone, they are topped by a bronze urn and gas flames, which are lit on special occasions such as Remembrance Sunday, Armistice Day and Commonwealth Day.

The Memorial Gates were inaugurated on 6 November 2002 by Queen Elizabeth II with an inscription stating that this took place in the Golden Jubilee year of her reign.

== Gallery ==
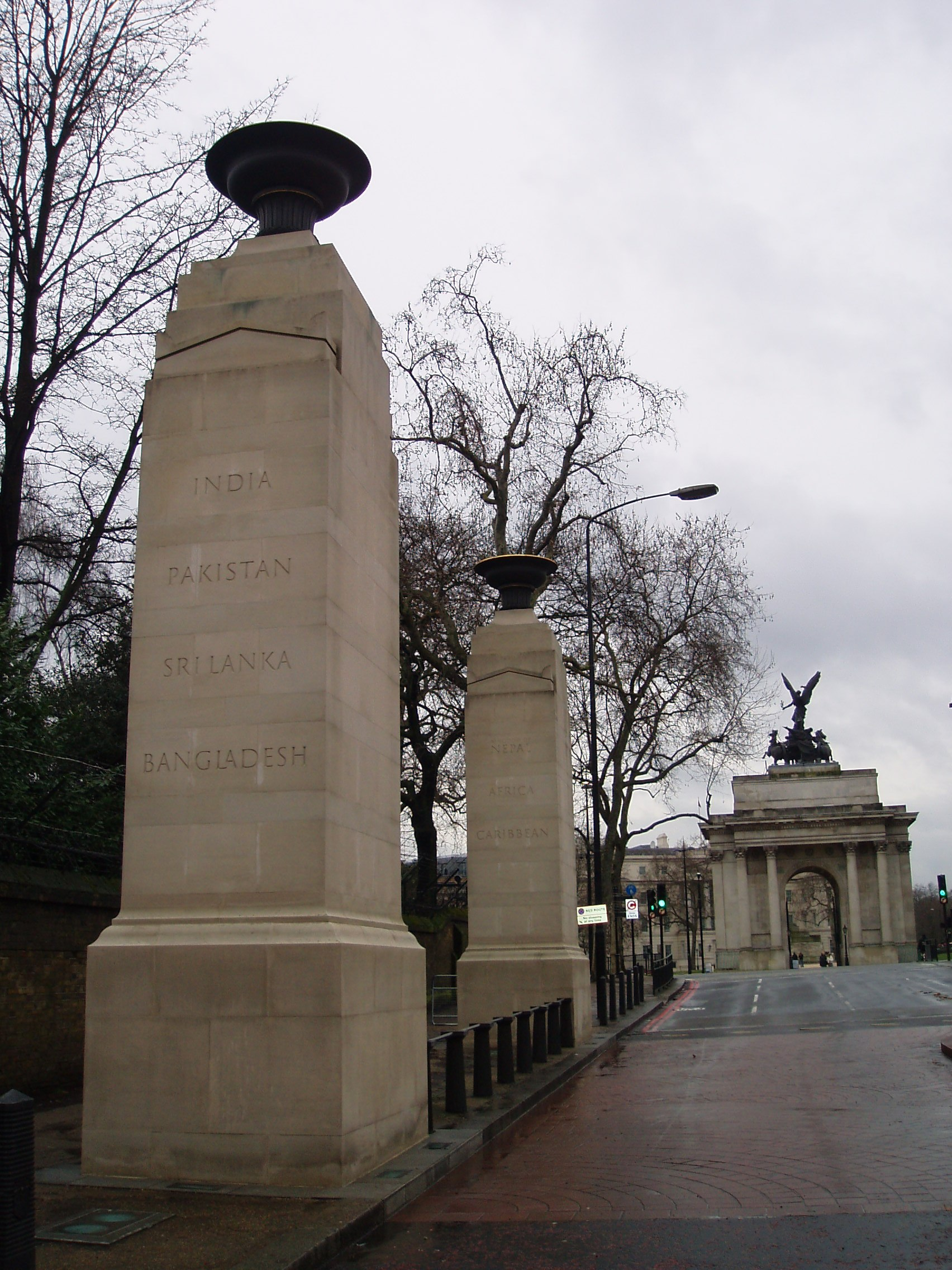
Two of the columns and the Wellington Arch

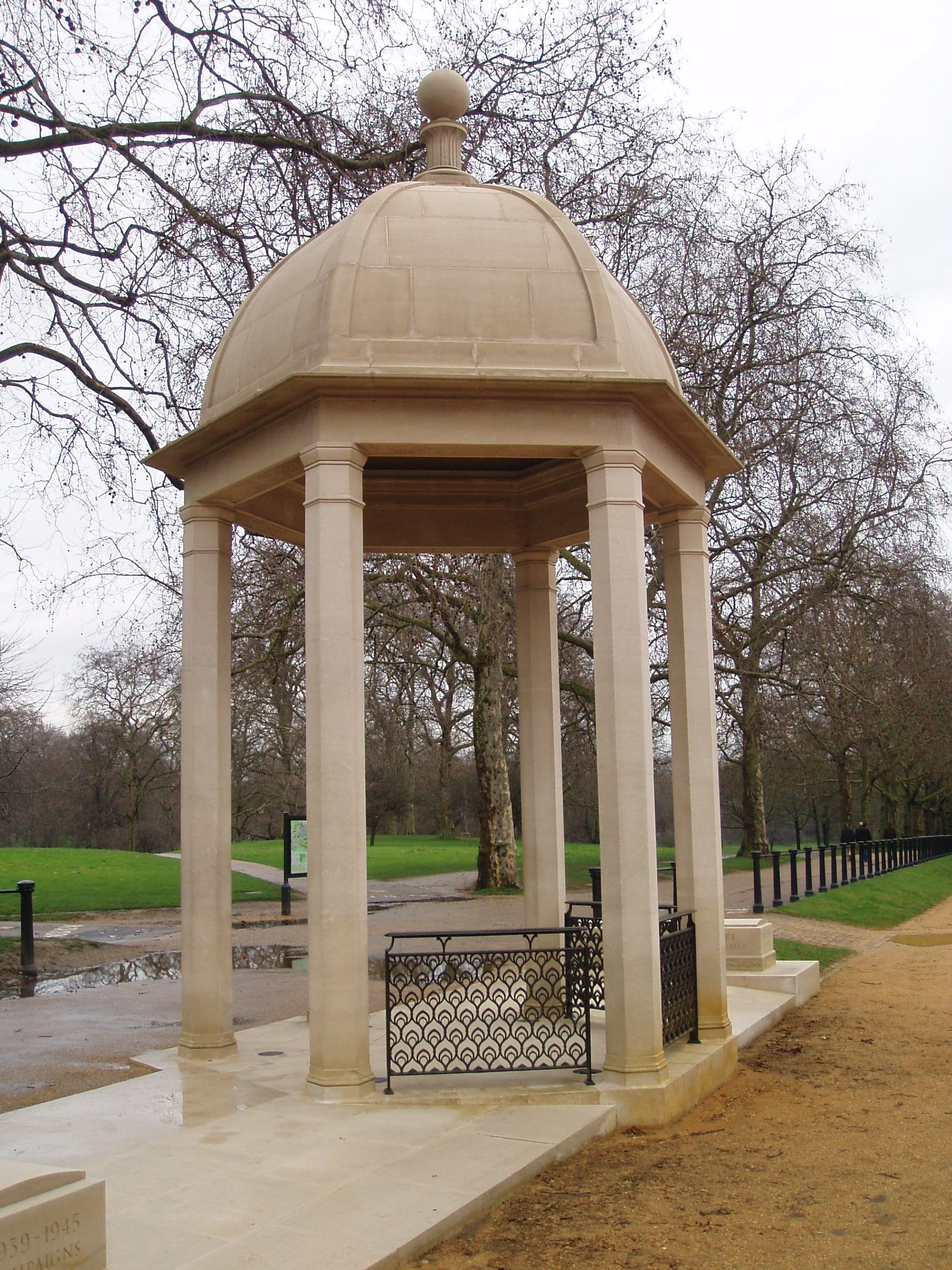
The memorial pavilion on the Green Park side

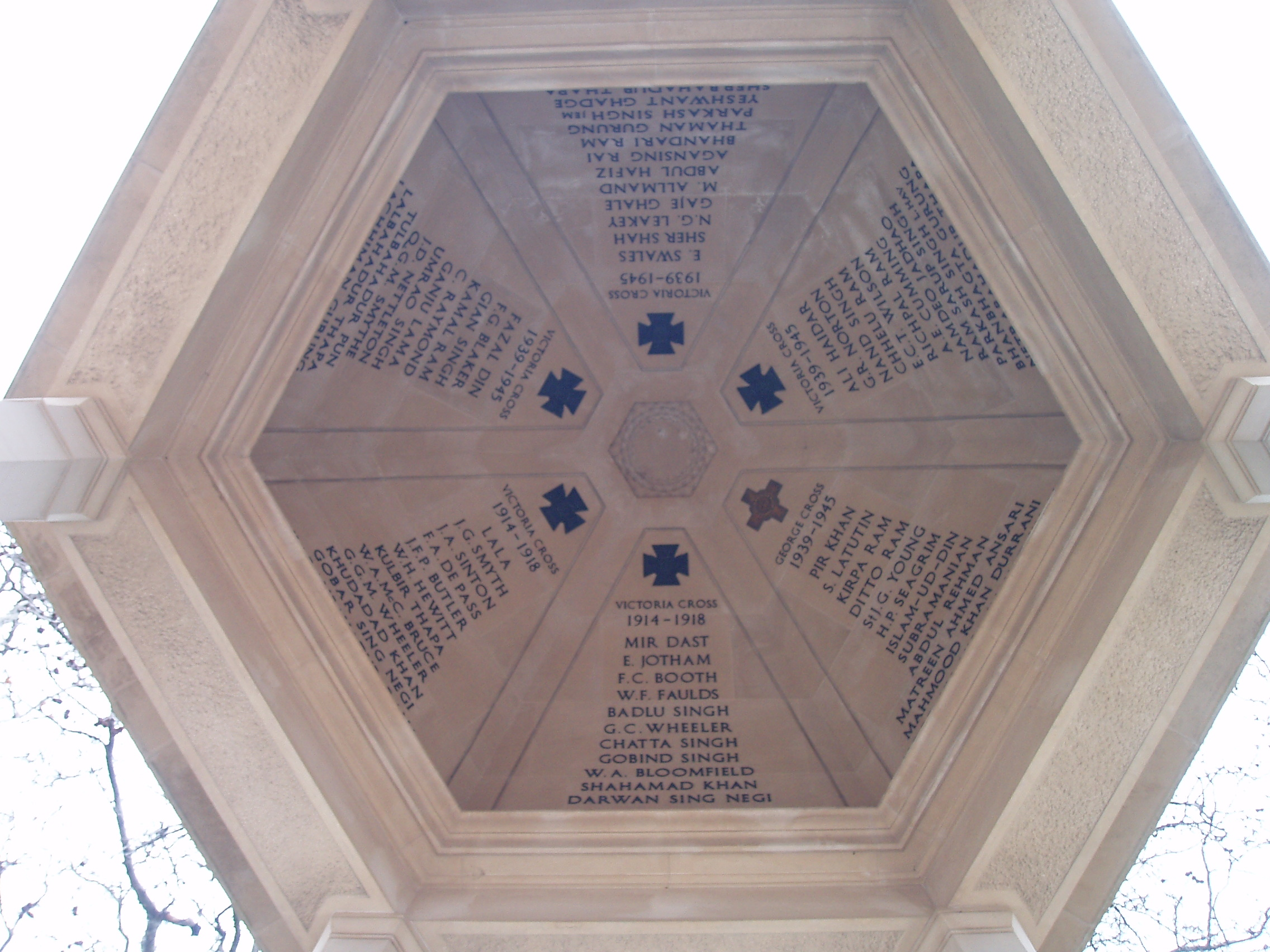
The George Cross and Victoria Cross names

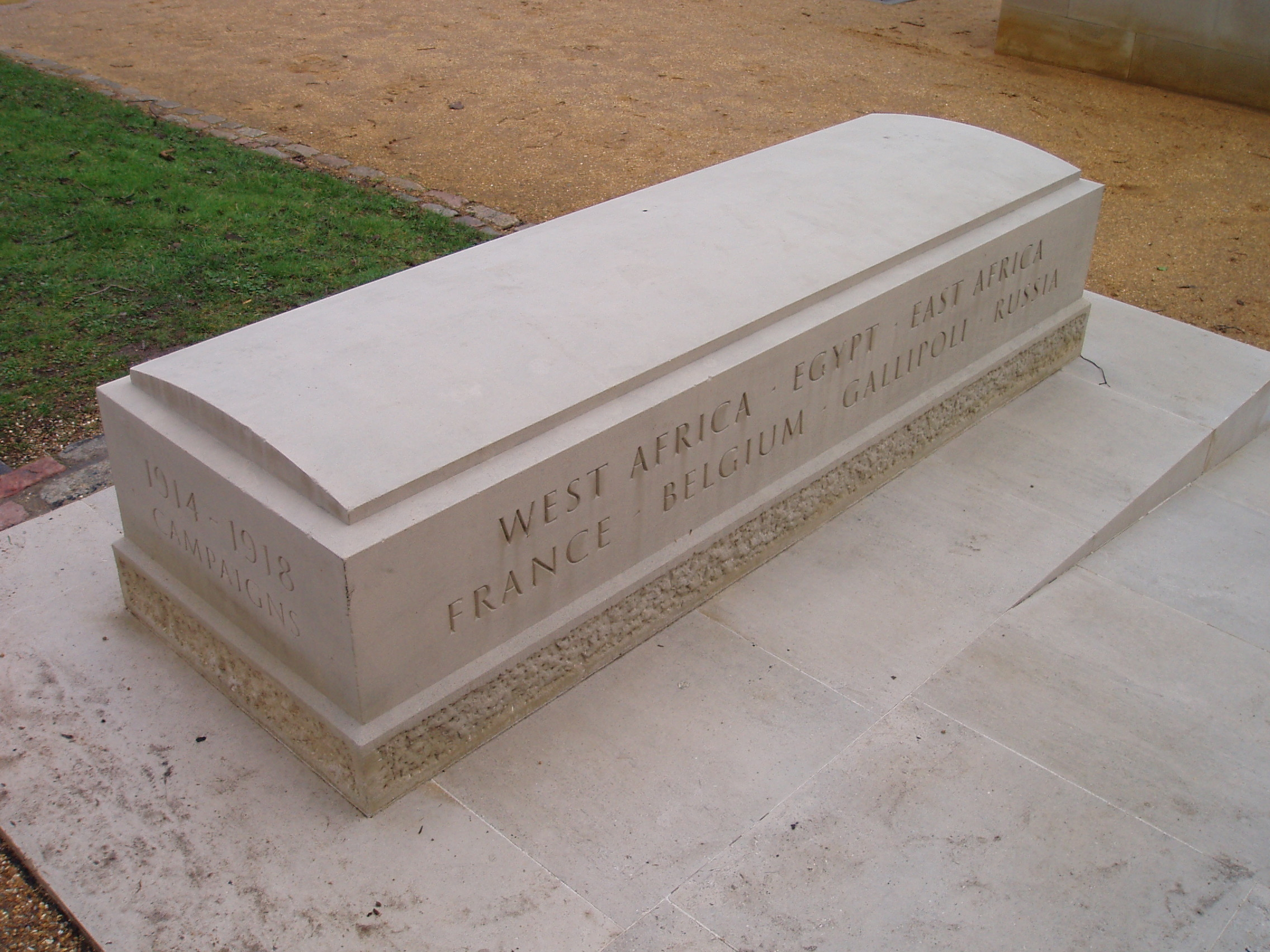
The stone listing World War I campaigns

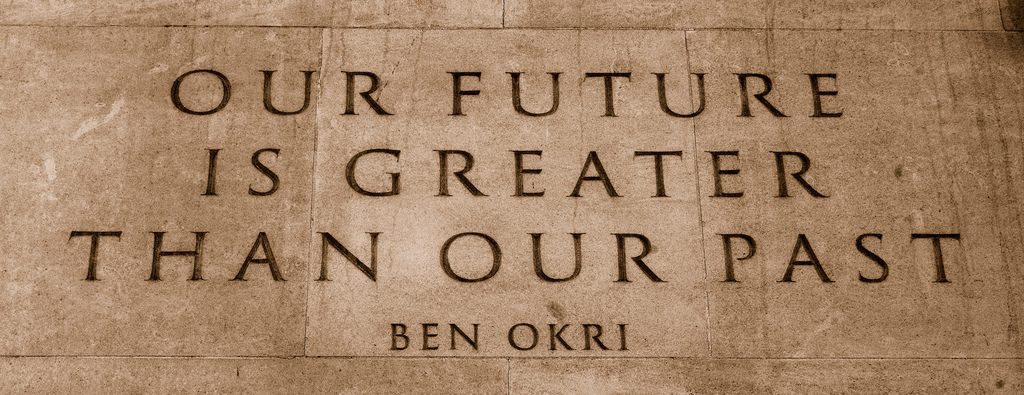
The quote by Ben Okri engraved on the gates

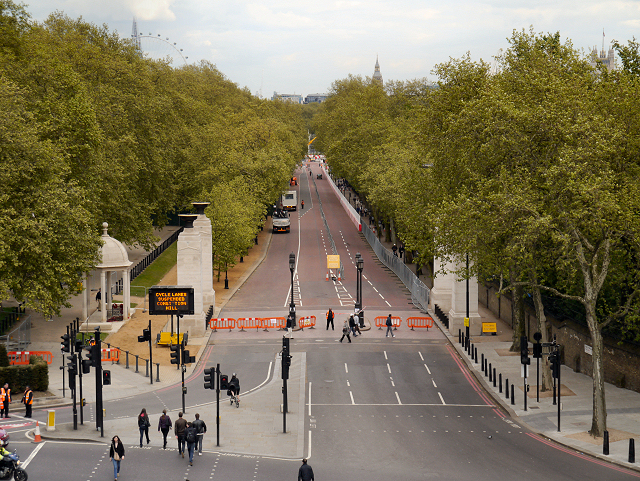
View from the Wellington Arch looking down on the Memorial Gates and Constitution Hill
