= Philip Yates =

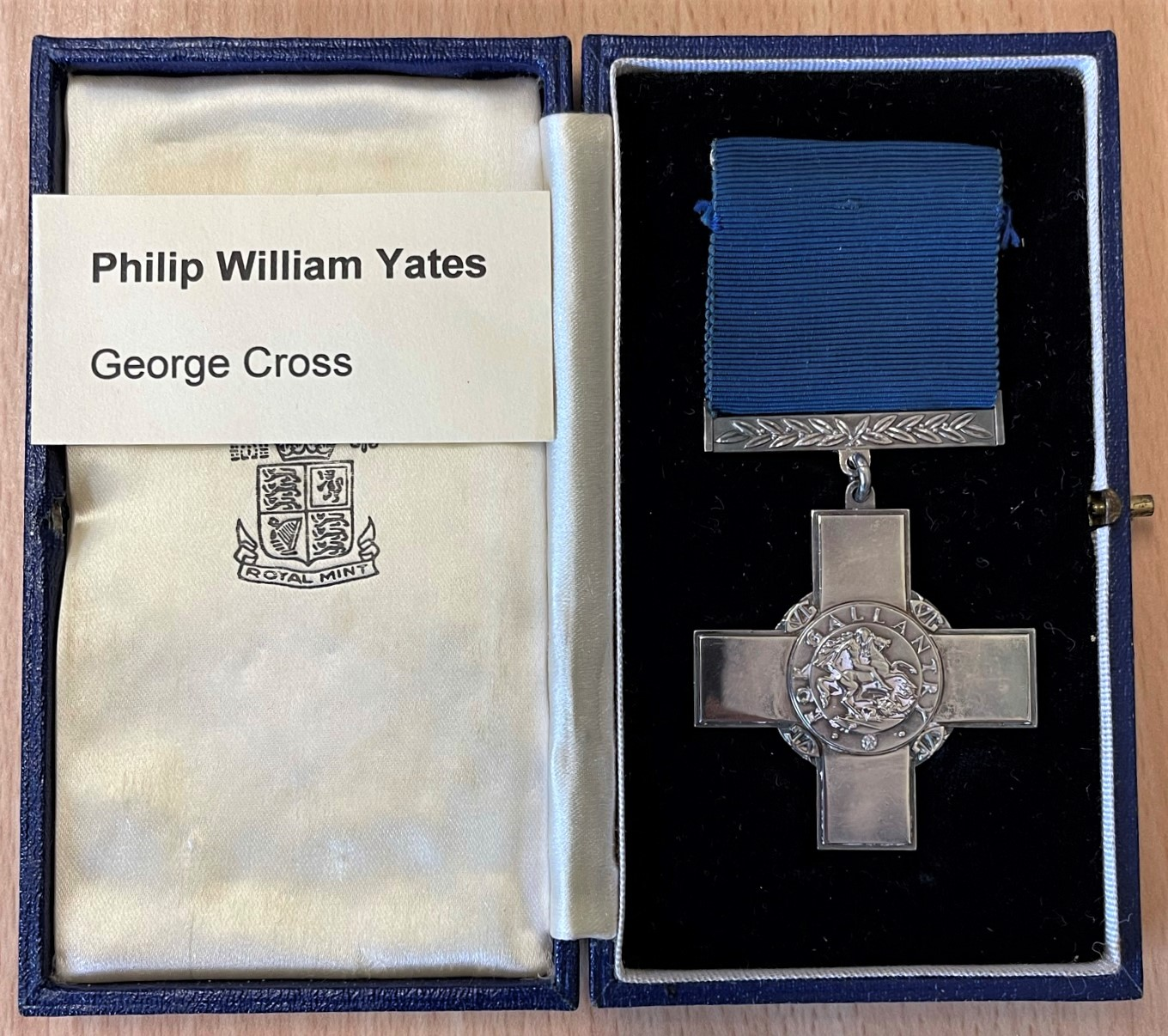
- Yates's George Cross medal
- Born: 3 January 1913; County Durham, England
- Died: 14 February 1998 (aged 85); Doncaster, Yorkshire, England
- Occupations: Coal Miner, Foundry Worker
- Awards: Edward Medal, Class II (later exchanged for the George Cross) Queen Elizabeth II Silver Jubilee Medal Order of Industrial Heroism

Philip William Yates GC (3 January 1913 – 14 February 1998) was an English recipient of the Edward Medal, later exchanged for a George Cross, awarded for gallantry in the 1931 Bentley Colliery Disaster in Yorkshire.

Philip William Yates was born in County Durham on 3 January 1913. He left Counden Church School in Bishop Auckland at the age of 13 to work as an undertaker's assistant, in 1927 he became a coal miner.

On 24 November 1931 there was a huge underground explosion at Bentley Colliery near Doncaster, Yorkshire, caused by firedamp, of the 47 miners working at the coal face 45 were to die, some later. As the walls and roof of the tunnel collapsed hundreds of other miners were injured.

Aged 19, Yates was working as a compressed air haulage engine driver in the north-east district. His engine was in a recess close to the coalface where the explosion occurred, but escaped because two ventilation doors in front of him took the force of the blast; even his lamp remained alight.

Yates with his colleagues Richard Darker, Oliver Soulsby and Frank Sykes, went to the area of the explosion and without regard to the dangers they extricated the injured miners and moved them to safety, this involved carrying them two miles underground to the main shaft, they were under constant danger of more explosions.

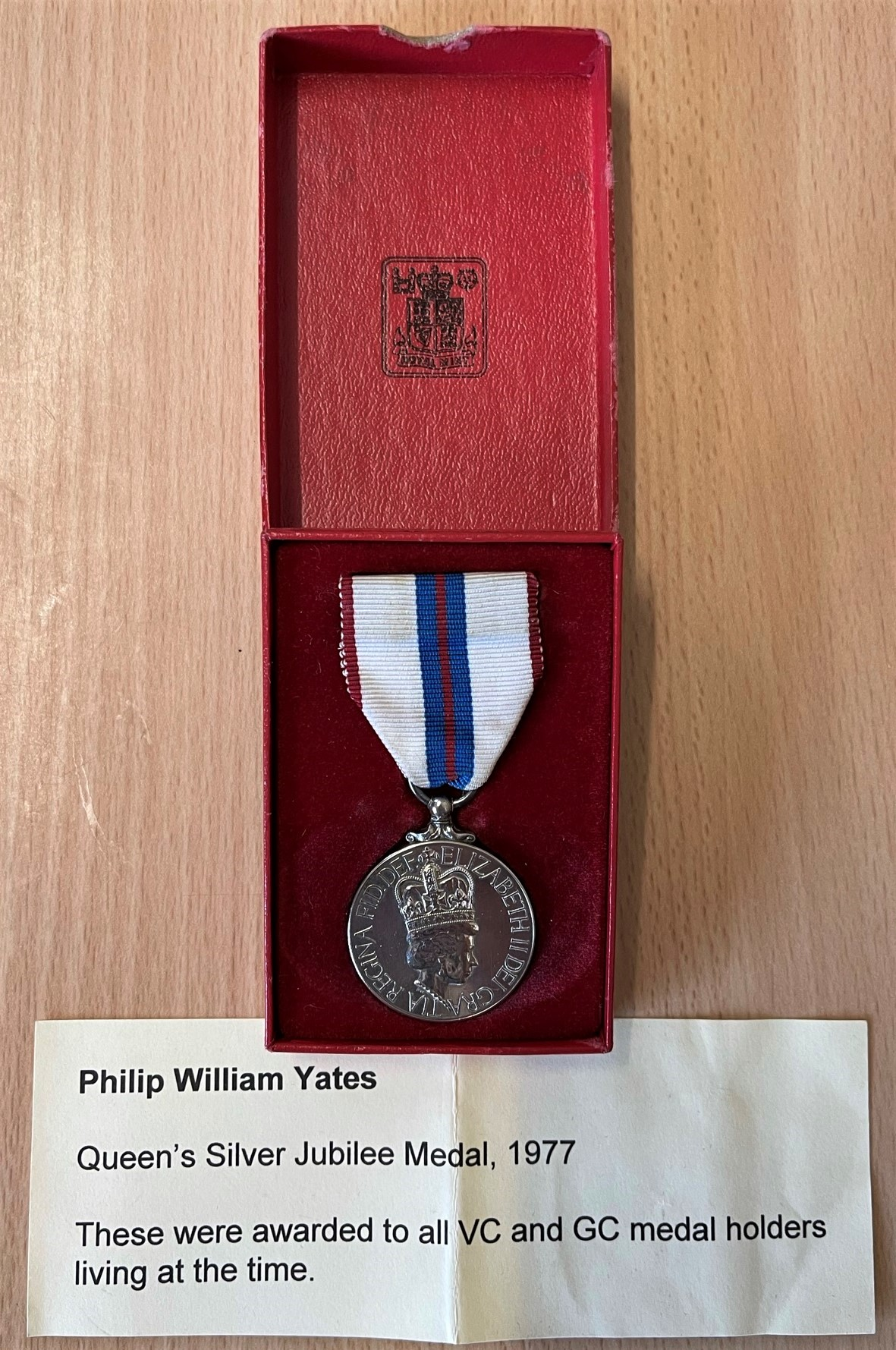
Queen Elizabeth II Silver Jubilee Medal awarded to Philip William Yates

Eight miners who were involved in the rescue were awarded the Edward Medal, including Yates and his three colleagues and members of the colliery rescue team. Yates was also awarded the Order of Industrial Heroism.

After the Bentley Colliery disaster he left the coal industry to be a foundry worker until he retired. He exchanged his Edward Medal for the George Cross in 1971 when the Edward Medal was withdrawn.

Yates retired to South Yorkshire with his wife and two children and in 1987 he became the last survivor of those awarded the George Cross in the disaster. He died on 14 February 1998 aged 85.
