= Michael Munnelly =

- Born: Michael Joseph Munnelly; 17 April 1941; Sligo, Ireland
- Died: 24 December 1964 (aged 23); London, England
- Cause of death: Stabbing
- Occupation: Journalist
- Known for: Murder victim Posthumously awarded the George Cross

Michael Joseph Munnelly GC (17 April 1941 – 24 December 1964) was posthumously awarded the George Cross for his gallantry on 24 December 1964 in Regent's Park, London. Munnelly was born in Sligo town, Ireland and moved to London aged 15 to live with his mother in Herne Hill. He spent his holidays with his grandmother in St Brigid's Place, Sligo town.

== Life and work ==
Born in 1941, Munnelly was a journalist for The People newspaper.

== George Cross citation ==
Fourteen youths had been drinking at Kentish Town and had travelled in a van to Regents Park Road to a flat where two of them had been invited. They were in an extremely rowdy mood shouting and swearing. The fourteen were refused entry to the flat and some of them immediately attacked the occupier. Others went to a dairy opposite and from crates left outside began to bombard the flat with milk bottles, resulting in all the windows being broken, also the window of the shop next door. Some of the youths were attacking the occupier of the flat, some were throwing dozens of bottles and all were shouting, swearing and milling about.

Although there were several onlookers, it appears they were all too frightened to interfere. In an endeavour to protect his property, the dairyman went into the street where he was immediately attacked by being butted, kicked and knifed in the groin. Michael Joseph Munnelly, his brother and a friend were the occupants of a third floor flat and hearing the noise of breaking glass and shouting, looked out of the window and saw the dairyman was on the ground being kicked. All three men decided they must go and help him and ran to the street. They detained two men but Munnelly was hit on the head by some person and released the man he was holding.

The van, which had left the scene, then returned and was followed into the next turning by Munnelly's friend who in an attempt to stop the van banged on the side. The van stopped and he grabbed a youth who was sitting next to the driver. This resulted in a cry for help, the rear door of the van opened and several of the youths attacked him until they had kicked him senseless. Munnelly immediately went to his rescue. Bottles were thrown at him, he was kicked and received a fatal stab wound in his lower left abdomen. The youths then fled. Munnelly and the others were mere onlookers who could have stayed in the safety of the flat but without thought for themselves they went to the assistance of the dairyman. Munnelly saw his friend being attacked with knives and immediately went to his rescue. Within a few minutes he was dead. He had given his life to save that of his friend.

(Quote from the award notice which appeared on 29 June 1965 supplement to The London Gazette.)

== See also ==
- List of George Cross recipients
