= Frank Emery Nix =

Frank Emery Nix EM (22 April 1914 – 8 August 1996), was awarded the Edward Medal for the heroism he displayed on 18 April 1944, while working as a miner at Pilsley Colliery.

== Early career ==
Frank Emery Nix was borm in Tibshelf, Derbyshire and spent time at Tibshelf Botton pit then moved Pilsley Colliery in 1939 becoming a Pit Deputy.

== Citation ==
Nix was awarded the Edward Medal for his action after an accident undergroundNix was awarded the Edward Medal for his bravery. His award was announced in the London Gazette on 21 November 1944.

== Later life ==
Nix died on 8 August 1996 in Chesterfield.

== George Cross ==
The Edward Medal was discontinued in 1971, when surviving recipients of the Edward Medal (along with holders of the Albert Medal) were invited to exchange their award for the George Cross. Nine elected not to exchange their medals, including Nix.
