= Raymond Lewin =

Recipient of the George Cross

Raymond Mayhew Lewin GC
- Born: 14 January 1915; Kettering, Northamptonshire
- Died: 21 November 1941 (aged 26); Oakington, Cambridgeshire
- Burial place: Kettering Cemetery, Northamptonshire
- Military career
- Allegiance: United Kingdom
- Branch: Royal Air Force RAFVR
- Service years: 1936-1941
- Rank: Pilot Officer
- Service number: 700404
- Units: No. 148 Squadron RAF; No. 109 Squadron RAF
- Conflicts: World War II
- Awards: George Cross

Pilot Officer Raymond Mayhew Lewin GC (14 January 1915 – 21 November 1941) of the Royal Air Force Volunteer Reserve (RAFVR) was (whilst a Sergeant) awarded the George Cross for the courage he showed in rescuing his co-pilot from their burning plane on 3 November 1940 in Malta.

== Biography ==
He was born on 14 January 1915, in Kettering and was educated at Kimbolton School. He joined the RAFVR in the spring of 1936

On 15 March 1941 he was commissioned as a Pilot Officer (with seniority backdated to 27 January 1941). He was killed in action on 21 November 1941, whilst flying with No. 109 Squadron, and is buried in his home town of Kettering.

== George Cross citation ==
The citation was published in the London Gazette of 7 March 1941 (dated 11 March):

In November, 1940, Sergeant Lewin was the captain of an aircraft on a night bombing mission. Shortly after the take off the aircraft began to sink and crashed into a hillside where it burst into flames. Sergeant Lewin extricated himself and saw three of his crew of four climbing out of the escape hatch. He ordered them to run clear. He then ran round the blazing wing in which full petrol tanks were burning and crawled under it to rescue his injured second pilot. Despite his own injuries - a cracked kneecap and severe contusions on the face and legs - he dragged and carried the pilot some 40 yards from the aircraft to a hole in the ground, where he lay on him just as the bombs exploded. This superbly gallant deed was performed in the dark under most difficult conditions and in the certain knowledge that the bombs and petrol tanks would explode.

— London Gazette

== Medals ==
Pilot Officer Lewin's citation, photographs, medals and a copy of his George Cross medal can be viewed at (1101) Kettering Air Cadets (Kettering, England) by appointment on Monday and Wednesday evenings. The squadron also parades at his graveside on Remembrance Day each year as a mark of respect for one of 1101 squadron's ex members.

== See also ==
- List of George Cross recipients
