= John Dowland (RAF officer) =

John Noel Dowland
- Born: 6 November 1914; Lewisham, England
- Died: 13 January 1942 (aged 27); Luqa, Malta
- Burial place: Capuccini Naval Cemetery, Malta
- Military career
- Allegiance: United Kingdom
- Branch: Royal Air Force
- Rank: Wing Commander
- Conflicts: Second World War: Home Front; The Blitz; Mediterranean and Middle East theatre; Siege of Malta †
- Awards: George Cross

John Noel Dowland, GC (6 November 1914 – 13 January 1942) was a Royal Air Force officer of the Second World War and a recipient of the George Cross.

== Life ==
Dowland was the son of the vicar of Ruscombe, the Rev. F.M. Dowland, and educated at St John's School, Leatherhead before taking flight training at Cranwell in 1934. After Cranwell he commissioned a pilot officer and joined a squadron of Bomber Command. At the outbreak of World War II he took command of a unit overseas.

Along with civilian armament instructor Leonard Henry Harrison, Dowland was awarded the George Cross for his gallantry in defusing a bomb that had fallen on the grain ship SS Kildare in Immingham docks on 11 February 1940. The bomb proved extremely difficult to defuse as it had embedded itself at an extreme angle in the main deck. The citation, which appeared in the London Gazette on 7 January 1941, noted that he displayed the same "conspicuous courage and devotion to duty in circumstances of exceptional danger and difficulty" when defusing a bomb on a trawler in June 1940.

His and Harrison's actions were the earliest to be awarded the George Cross, although Thomas Alderson's award was the first to be announced.

Dowland later achieved the rank of wing commander, but was killed when taking part in a raid on Pantelleria on 13 January 1942. After the aircraft he was piloting was damaged by anti-aircraft fire, Dowland attempted an emergency landing at Luqa, Malta. Both he and his observer were killed in the subsequent crash. Dowland is buried in Capuccini Naval Cemetery, Malta.
