= Brian Spillett =

GC Brian Spillett
- Born: 21 July 1937; Edmonton, London, England
- Died: 19 July, 16 January 1965 (aged 27)
- Military career
- Allegiance: United Kingdom
- Branch: British Army
- Unit: Royal Horse Artillery

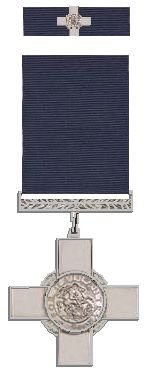
George Cross and its ribbon bar

Brian Spillett GC (21 July 1937 – 16 January 1965) was posthumously awarded the George Cross, the highest British (and Commonwealth) award for bravery out of combat. Spillett died of burns he received while trying to save a neighbour in Lodge Crescent, Waltham Cross, Hertfordshire in Chase Farm Hospital in Enfield. He was a Territorial Army Lance-Bombardier in P Battery, 289 Parachute Light Regiment, Royal Horse Artillery and in civilian life worked as a fitter. His George Cross was announced in a supplement to the London Gazette of 25 June 1965, and dated 29 June 1965.

The London Gazette citation describes how Spillett became aware that there was a fire at a neighbouring house where three generations of a family lived. Spillett arrived, still only partly dressed, to learn that the father Mr Palmer of the family was still in the house. The whole house was already well alight, but he went in despite being held back by other neighbours. He managed to fight his way upstairs but was unable to get through to the trapped man. He himself became trapped and had to escape the flames by jumping from a first floor window. Once the fire was over, he was found in the garden of a neighbour after crawling down the garden, through the alley and thinking he was crawling to his own back door to his wife, ended up at the back door of a neighbour, badly burned and with other serious injuries, from jumping and falling through the leanto. He was taken to hospital but died a week later. He was survived by a young wife Jean and four-month-old daughter, Jacqueline Spillett.

== See also ==
- List of George Cross recipients
