= Frederick Davies (GC) =

Recipient of the George Cross

Frederick Davies GC
- Born: 17 February 1913; Shepherd's Bush, London, England
- Died: 23 August 1945 (aged 32); Harlesden, London, England
- Military career
- Branch: National Fire Service
- Rank: Fireman
- Awards: George Cross

Fireman Frederick Davies GC (17 February 1913 – 23 August 1945) of the British National Fire Service was posthumously awarded the George Cross, the highest British (and Commonwealth) award for bravery out of combat. He died attempting to rescue two girls from a fire in Harlesden.

The citation was published in a supplement to the London Gazette of 1 February 1946 (dated 5 February 1946), and read:

St. James's Palace, S.W.1. 5th February, 1946.

The KING has been graciously pleased to award the GEORGE CROSS to:-

Frederick DAVIES (deceased), Fireman, No. 34 (London) Area, National Fire Service.

Premises which consisted of a shop and house of five rooms caught fire. The N.F.S. were informed that two children were in the front room on the second floor. The escape was immediately slipped and pitched to the middle window of this floor. Before it was in position Davies ran up the escape.

At this stage flames were pouring from the windows on the second floor and licking up the front of the building. Upon Davies reaching the window he at once tried to enter but bursts of flame momentarily halted him. Undaunted, however, he climbed into the window with his back to the flames and entered the room. He was seen to endeavour to remove his tunic presumably to wrap it around and protect the children but his hands were now too badly burned for him to do so. During this time Davies was moving around the blazing room in an endeavour to locate the children, and after a short period he returned with a child in his arms whom he handed out of the window. He then turned back into the room to find the other child.

He was next seen to fling himself out of the window on to the escape, the whole of his clothing being alight. He was helped to the ground, the flames on his clothes were extinguished and he was conveyed to hospital suffering from severe burns. Later he died from his injuries.

The gallantry and outstanding devotion to duty displayed by Fireman Davies was of the highest order. He knew the danger he was facing, but with complete disregard of his own safety he made a most heroic attempt to rescue the two children. In so doing, he lost his life.

== See also ==
- List of George Cross recipients
