= Henry Harwood Flintoff =

George Cross recipient (1930–2020)

Henry Harwood Flintoff (3 September 1930 – 5 June 2020, born Harwood Henry Flintoff) was a farm worker and recipient of the George Cross, Britain's highest civilian award for gallantry, after rescuing a farmer from a bull.

== Personal life ==
Flintoff was born on 3 September 1930 in Saltburn-by-the-Sea, the son of Harwood taylor and Ruth Flintoff; he had seven sisters. The family moved from Saltburn to a farm in Farndale because his father's health was damaged by the chemicals he used in the garage he ran. Flintoff attended school in Farndale, and at the age of 12 started working on his father's farm, named Thunderhead Farm. His whole working life was spent on farms, mainly on the Hutton-le-Hole estate. He married Sylvia in 1993 and she predeceased him. He took a great interest in aviation and was air traffic controller for his local flying club. He died in a nursing home near Scarborough on 5 June 2020 and his ashes were buried in Gillamoor cemetery, the same cemetery where the man he rescued, John Atkinson, was buried in 1973 after dying from a tractor accident.

== George Cross ==
On 23 June 1944 Flintoff, then a farm labourer aged 13, came to the rescue of farmer John Atkinson who was being attacked by a bull. The local vicar reported the incident to the local press, and Flintoff was awarded the Edward Medal, an award for gallantry for those employed in mines or industry. All recipients of the Edward Medal were in 1972 "deemed to be a person who has been awarded not that Medal but the George Cross".

The description of the event in the official citation in The London Gazette states:

The KING has been pleased to award the Edward Medal to Harwood Henry Flintoff in recognition of his gallantry in the following circumstances: On the 23rd June last a farmer was driving a bull which turned on him, knocked him down, and knelt on his chest. Harwood Henry Flintoff, a thirteen-year-old schoolboy who assists the farmer immediately left his work in a neighbouring field and ran to his aid. After a struggle with the savage bull, in which the farmer was injured, Henry Flintoff though unarmed caught hold of the animal and together he and the farmer managed to grasp the ring in the bull's nose, and to hold on to it until they both became exhausted. The bull then broke loose but was caught and led to its shed by a farm labourer who came to assist with a pitch fork. By his courageous action this boy saved the farmer from more serious injury and from possible death.

Flintoff was an active member of the Victoria Cross and George Cross Association until his death in 2020.
