= Kenneth Spooner =

Recipient of the George Cross

Kenneth Gerald Spooner GC
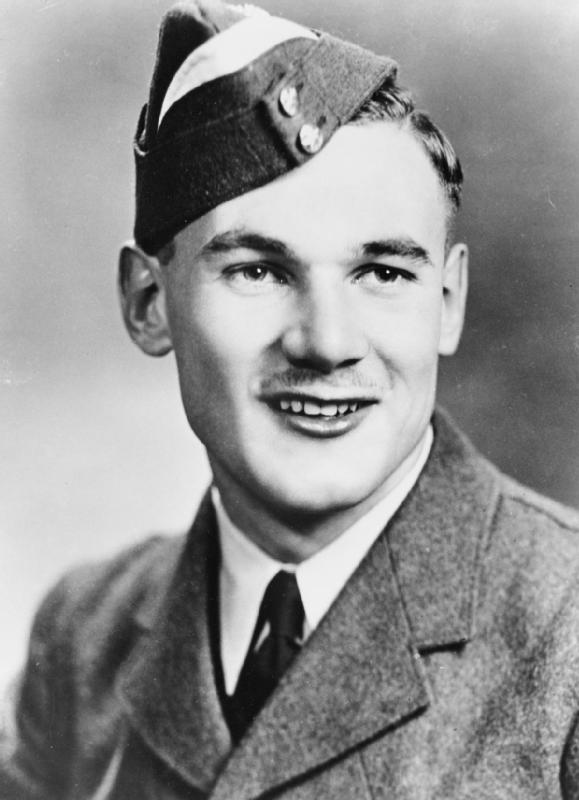
- Born: 22 April 1922; Smiths Falls, Canada
- Died: 14 May 1943 (aged 21); Lake Erie
- Burial place: Smith's Falls (Hillcrest) Cemetery, Ontario, Canada
- Military career
- Branch: Royal Canadian Air Force
- Rank: Leading Aircraftman
- Awards: George Cross

Leading Aircraftman Kenneth Gerald Spooner, GC (24 April 1922 – 14 May 1943) was posthumously awarded the George Cross for the self-sacrifice he showed in saving the lives of three comrades on 14 May 1943.

Spooner, a British Commonwealth Air Training Program student navigator who had no pilot training or experience, took over the controls of an Avro Anson trainer of the No.4 Air Observer School in London, Ontario when the pilot fainted and the plane lurched into a dive. He managed to level the plane for long enough for three crew members to bail out before the plane crashed into Lake Erie, killing him instantly.

One of the crew landed in the lake and drowned but the testimony of the two survivors led to his award, the citation noting "This airman with complete disregard for his personal safety and in conformity with the highest traditions of the service, sacrificed his life in order to save the lives of his comrades." He was only the second member of the Royal Canadian Air Force to be awarded a George Cross. In 1949, the local school board named a new elementary school to honour his memory. The medal was purchased by the Canadian War Museum in Ottawa in February 1988.
