= Horace James Cannon =

British soldier and George Cross recipient

- Born: 26 July 1895; Bradford, West Yorkshire
- Died: 21 September 1975 (aged 80); Bradford, West Yorkshire
- Military career
- Allegiance: United Kingdom
- Branch: British Army; Royal Air Force
- Service years: 1914–1919
- Rank: Flight Sergeant
- Unit: No. 50 Squadron RFC
- Conflicts: First World War
- Awards: George Cross

Horace James Cannon, GC (26 July 1895 – 21 September 1975) was a British soldier, aircraft mechanic and a recipient of the Albert Medal. In 1971, due to a decline in the status and significance of the Albert Medal, Cannon was invited to exchange his award for the George Cross; he accepted and formally became a recipient of the latter.

== Early life ==
Cannon was born in Bradford, West Yorkshire, on 26 July 1895.

== First World War ==
Cannon joined the 16th Battalion of the West Yorkshire Regiment in 1915. Cannon then volunteered to join the Royal Flying Corps, was accepted, and became an aircraft mechanic in France and later in England.

Promoted to flight sergeant, Cannon was billeted at RFC Station Grantham in Lincolnshire (renamed RAF Spitalgate in 1942) on 21 January 1918, when a warplane crash-landed from a height of about one hundred and fifty feet and then burst into flames. Cannon and another flight sergeant risked their lives to rescue the pilot, who later died from his injuries. Cannon was awarded the Albert Medal for his efforts, which later became the George Cross for living recipients (including Cannon) when the Albert Medal was withdrawn from use in 1971.

== Later life ==
After Cannon retired from the Royal Air Force, he opened a car dealership and repair shop in the city.

Coincidentally, in retirement, Cannon lived next door to George and Mary Hall and their daughter Nanette Hanson (née Hall). Hanson became a teacher in Dundee and was herself awarded the Albert Medal in 1968 for her actions saving the lives of children in her care in a school siege in Dundee the previous year, in which she was shot and killed. Since Hanson's award was posthumous, her Albert Medal did not become a George Cross in 1971 as her former neighbour's did.
