= Abdul Rahman (GC) =

Abdul Rahman GC MM
- Born: 1921; Montgomery, Punjab, British India (modern Sahiwal, Pakistan)
- Died: 22 February 1946 (aged 23–24); Kletek, Java, Dutch East Indies
- Military career
- Allegiance: British India
- Branch: British Indian Army
- Rank: Havildar
- Units: 3rd Battalion, 9th Jat Regiment
- Conflicts: World War II
- Awards: George Cross Military Medal

Havildar Abdul Rahman GC MM (1921–1946) was a soldier of the British Indian Army who was posthumously awarded the George Cross, the highest British (and Commonwealth) award for bravery not in combat. He was awarded the decoration for the gallantry he showed while saving three other men from a burning vehicle on 22 February 1946 in Kletek in Java. He was serving with the 3rd Battalion of the 9th Jat Regiment, which had fought in the Battle of Cauldron against Rommel's forces and saw action at Imphal. His GC award was announced in the London Gazette of 10 September 1946. His surname is sometimes spelled "Rehman". Abdul Rehman also won the Military Medal in Burma in 1944.

== See also ==
- List of George Cross recipients
