= Bob Taylor (GC) =

Bob Taylor GC
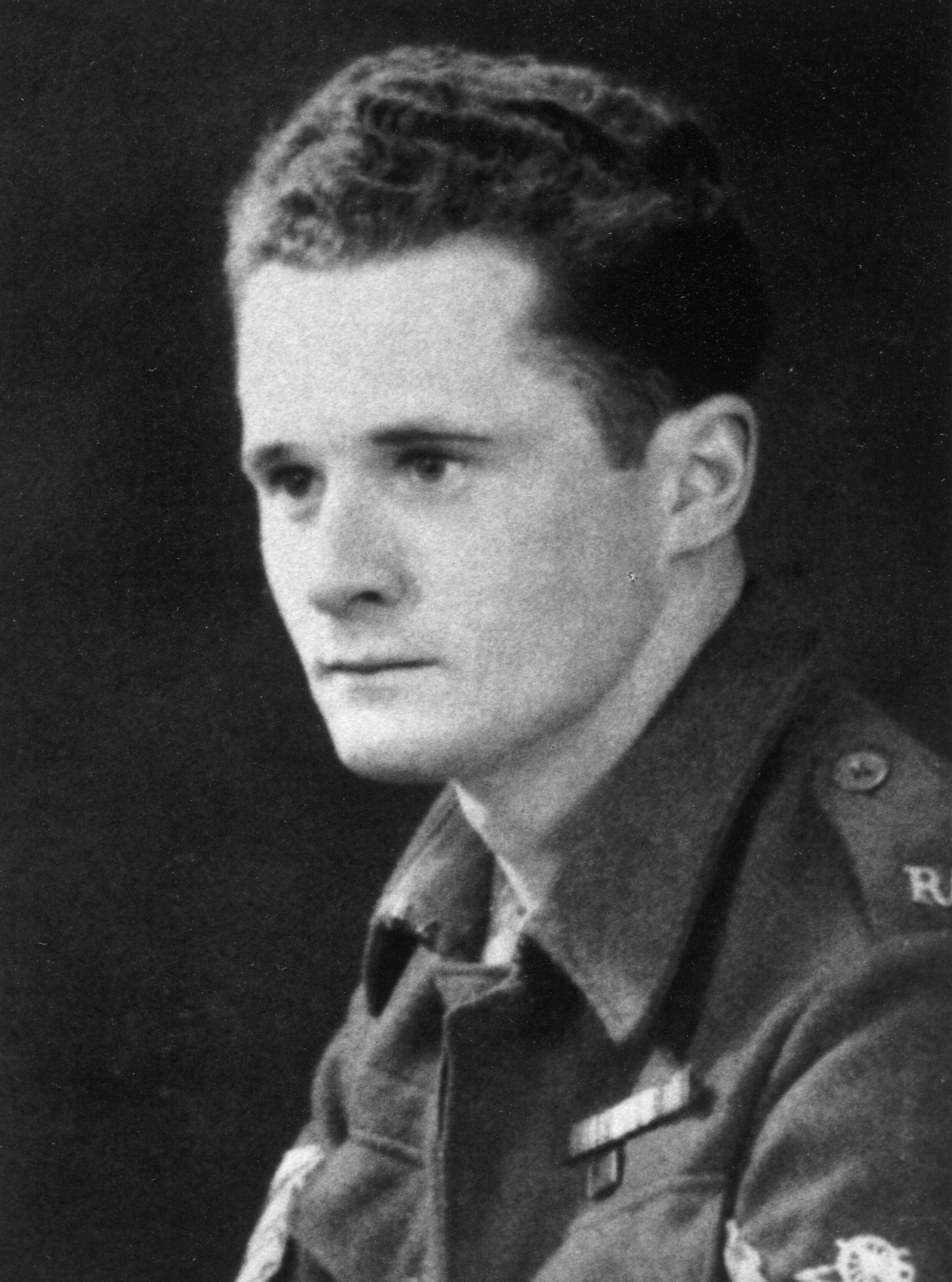
- Born: Robert George Taylor; 10 June 1920; Fishponds, Bristol
- Died: 13 March 1950 (aged 29); Bristol
- Awards: George Cross

Robert George Taylor GC (1920–1950) was posthumously awarded the George Cross for the heroism he displayed on 13 March 1950 in Bristol. His award was published in the London Gazette on 1 August 1950.

A 29-year-old newspaper advertising salesman and ex-serviceman, he attempted to stop two armed bank robbers as they fled from Lloyds Bank in Westbury Park, Bristol, but was shot and died at the scene. The criminals, both Polish labourers, were later apprehended and hanged at Winchester Prison.

In 2005, a plaque commemorating his heroism was unveiled at his former home in Bristol.
