= Bentley Colliery =

Former coal mine in South Yorkshire, England

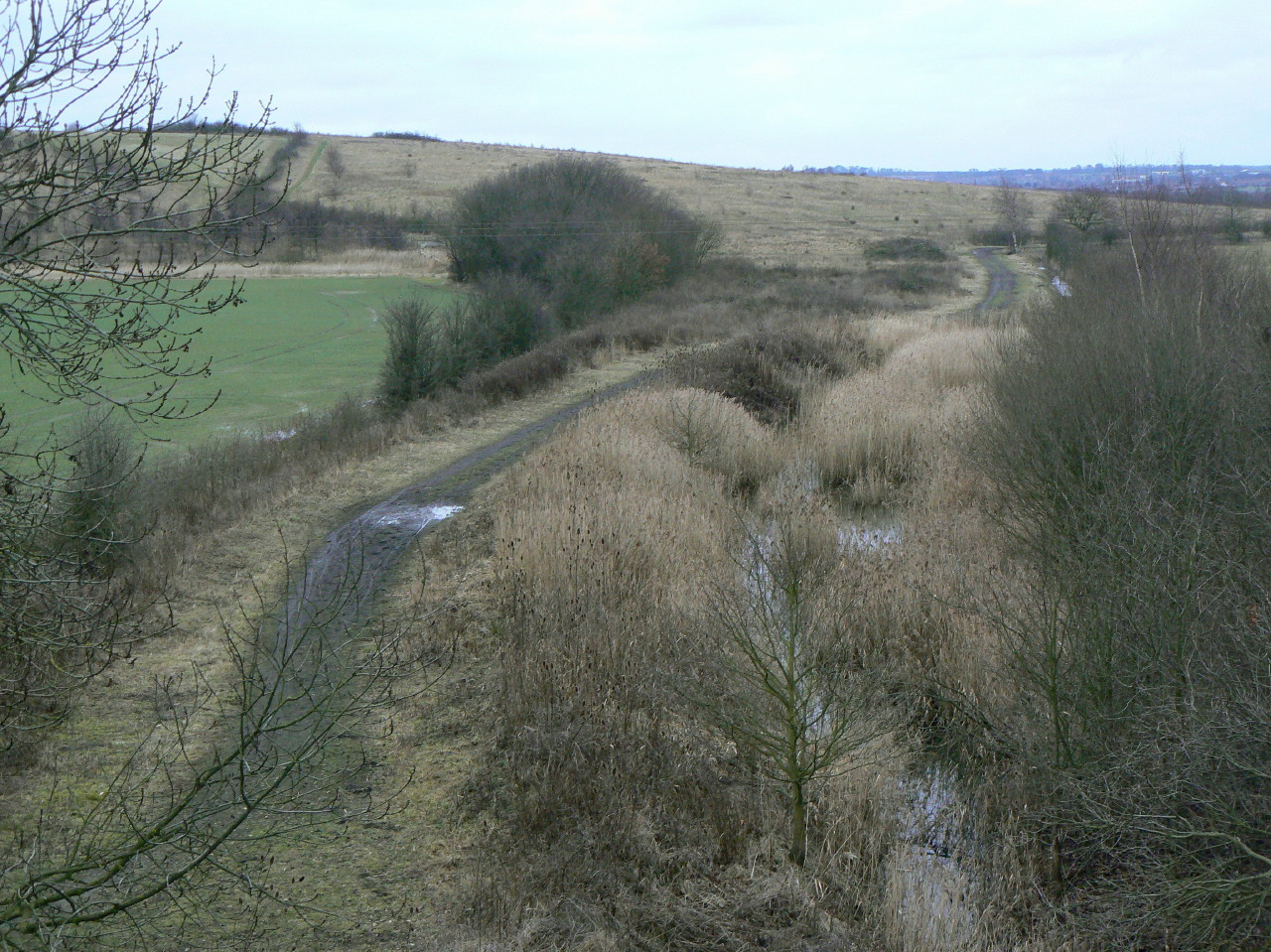
- The raised ground is the spoil tip from the former Bentley Colliery

- Location within South Yorkshire
- Location: Bentley, South Yorkshire, England; 53.5655°N 1.1401°W
- Products: Coal
- Production: 120,000 tonnes (130,000 tons)
- Financial year: 1924
- Opened: 1906 (coaling started in 1908)
- Closed: 1993
- Company: Barber, Walker & Co. 1906–1947; British Coal 1947–1993

Bentley Colliery was a coal mine in Bentley, near Doncaster in South Yorkshire, England, that operated between 1906 and 1993. In common with many other mines, it suffered disasters and accidents. The worst Bentley disaster was in 1931, when 45 miners were killed after a gas explosion. The site of the mine has been converted into a woodland.

== History ==
With profits earned from their Nottinghamshire pits, the Barber, Walker & Company initiated some exploratory boreholes in the Bentley area in the late 19th century. Further investigations were carried out in 1902 and in 1903, when several sites had boreholes driven into them to test for coal reserves. Despite hitting quicksand and extremes of flooding, what would become the main mine shaft was sunk in 1906, although coaling did not become possible until 1908. However, due to the bad geological foundations that the pit head was built upon, between 1910–1911 a re-inforced concrete headstock and pit shaft were installed above Shaft No. 1 to a depth of 45 feet (14 m) below ground and 14 feet (4.3 m) above. The design was relatively new to Britain and the materials were rolled steel and ferro-concrete.

The initial workforce at Bentley were those already in the employ of Barber, Walker and Company, who had been tempted away from their pits at Watnall and High Park in Nottinghamshire. Additionally, the local area could not supply enough men to work in the mine, so many moved into the area from outside the region and the company built Bentley New Village (which still exists) to accommodate all the workers. The new village had a school, football club (Bentley Colliery FC) and a cricket club.

By 1910, employees at the mine numbered 1,000; this had risen considerably during the pre-nationalisation era when the average number of workers at the mine between 1933 and 1947 was just under 3,000. The mine recorded its best year of production in 1924, when over 1,200,000 tonnes (1,300,000 tons) of coal was brought to the surface.

The colliery (and the Barnsley Seam in general) always had problems with methane gas being released during the mining process. Despite having one of the best ventilation systems in the mining industry at the time, the mine was beset by accidents and faced closures because of safety reasons. Many of the miners who worked there were uneasy about the situation. In 1939, the mine was second only to nearby Rossington Colliery in using diesel-powered flameproof locomotives for the movement of men, materials, and coal underground. Hand getting of coal had stopped by 1945 and the process was fully mechanised by the late 1960s.

The miners from Bentley went on strike during the 1984–1985 Miners' Strike. They also had sporadic incidents of strikes in 1988 after management accused three developmental miners of not making sufficient progress. Within three days, twelve South Yorkshire pits had ceased work with 10,000 miners on strike. The colliery manager wrote to all the miners stating that the dispute could only be resolved once the pit was back at full production. The following day, seventeen pits in South Yorkshire and two in North Yorkshire were on strike. The miners were all persuaded to return to work, but another stoppage a week later occurred when ten miners were threatened with dismissal after video footage had been studied from the previous strike with those miners accused of flying pickets.

In 1993, the mine was selected for closure by British Coal. The mine closed in December 1993, with the loss of 450 jobs. All surface buildings, including the headstocks, were demolished by 1995.

In 1998, the site was remediated and handed over to the Land Trust. It was converted into a woodland in 2004 and is now open to the public as the Bentley Community Woodland.

== Bentley Colliery Disaster ==
Bentley Colliery Disaster
- Date: 20 November 1931
- Location: Bentley Colliery Doncaster, England
- Cause: Gas explosion causing mine collapse
- Deaths: 45

At 5:45 pm on 20 November 1931, firedamp was ignited in the North East Colliery Face of the mine which caused roof falls preventing the men from reaching the shaft and the pit-head. After the explosion there was another inrush of gas which starved oxygen from the air. As news of the disaster spread, a crowd of over 2,000 people gather at the pit head to wait for news. Four men went down the pit wearing breathing apparatus and had to carry the injured over 2 miles (3.2 km) to get them to safety. For their bravery, they were all awarded the Edward Medal with eight in total being presented in the aftermath of the disaster. An inquest was opened up at the colliery two days later. The mines department also held an inquiry between 29 December 1931 and 6 January 1932, which lists 43 dead, not 45. Modern accounts have decided that the final death toll was 45, though five of the bodies could not be recovered.

== Other accidents ==
- On 12 February 1912, three men died and a further six were badly burned when there was an explosion underground.
- In 1974, a fire occurred in the Barnsley Seam and that area was sealed off. Fortunately, it was possible to develop new faces in other seams.
- On 21 November 1978, a paddy train conveying miners to and from the coal face derailed after it ran away on a downhill gradient and killed seven men with a further seventeen injured. A memorial service is conducted on the Sunday nearest to 20 November each year to commemorate those who died in the 1931 and 1978 disasters.
