= George Stronach =

George Preston Stronach
- Born: 14 April 1912; Portgordon, Scotland
- Died: 12 December 1999 (aged 87)
- Military career
- Allegiance: United Kingdom
- Branch: British Merchant Navy
- Rank: Captain (then Chief Officer)
- Unit: SS Ocean Voyager
- Conflicts: World War II
- Awards: George Cross

Captain (then Chief Officer) George Preston Stronach GC (14 April 1912 – 12 December 1999) of the Merchant navy was awarded the George Cross for the heroism he displayed in a rescue at sea in Tripoli Harbour on 19 March 1943. Notice of his award appeared in the London Gazette on 23 November 1943.

== 19 March 1943 ==
On 19 March 1943, Captain Duncan MacKellar's merchant vessel, the SS Ocean Voyager, while in Tripoli Harbour was attacked by German Ju 88 aircraft equipped with Motobomba FFF torpedoes. The ship's large consignment of petrol and ammunition caught fire.

As the captain had died in the attack, Stronach took command of the stricken vessel after being briefly knocked out by the explosions. He sought and found surviving crew members and led them to a lifeboat, then lowered another boat to search for more survivors.

He doused himself with water from a hose to protect himself as best he could from the flames engulfing the ship, climbed into the wrecked accommodation quarters and rescued a badly burned deck officer. He returned yet again to rescue another man, dragging him through a porthole, along the deck and lowering him over the side to safety.

Ordering a crewman to take the boat and injured men to safety he once again returned to the ship where he discovered another injured officer amidships and lowered him to a rescue raft which had managed to get alongside in answer to his calls for assistance. He finally saved yet another crew member, lying unconscious in the scuppers, before abandoning ship. In all he spent an hour and twenty minutes scouring the doomed vessel for survivors in the full knowledge that it could explode at any moment.

== George Cross citation ==
Notice of Stronach's George Cross appeared in the London Gazette on 23 November 1943:

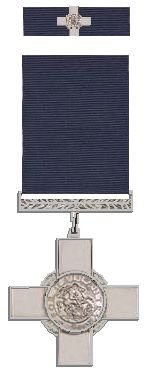
George Cross and its ribbon bar

The King has been graciously pleased to award the George Cross to: George Preston Stronach, Esq., Chief Officer.

When the ship was lying in harbour, a severe aircraft attack developed and she was hit and at once caught fire. The vessel had a large consignment of petrol and ammunition on board, which was exploding heavily all the time and in spite of strenuous efforts which were made to fight the fire she had to be abandoned. The Master was killed by the explosion and the responsibility for further operations devolved on the Chief Officer.

He had been rendered temporarily unconscious but recovered almost immediately and went forward to look for survivors. He found a number of the crew sheltering in the alley way and, braving the exploding ammunition, led them to a boat alongside which took them to safety. In order to provide for the transport of any other survivors who might be found, he then lowered another boat and brought it alongside the ship. Although the vessel was now burning furiously Mr. Stronach made his way to the officers' accommodation amidships. Finding a hose with a trickle of water coming through, he held this over his head and so kept himself sufficiently wet to protect him from the worst of the heat and flames. With great difficulty he climbed into the collapsed accommodation and found one of the deck officers, unconscious and badly burned. Mr. Stronach pulled him clear and dragged him along the deck to the lowered boat. Returning to the accommodation, he began to remove the debris from another officer who was trapped. By almost superhuman efforts he dragged the man through the porthole and along the deck. He then tied a rope around his waist and lowered him over the side to the boat. As the situation was becoming desperate Mr. Stronach ordered a man to take the boat to safety and once again he returned amidships where he discovered an officer who had been severely injured. Dragging him along the deck to the side of the ship, he tied a rope around him and lowered him over the side on to a raft which had returned to the ship in response to his calls. Again Mr Stronach continued his search for survivors and, taking a final look round aft, he saw a greaser lying unconscious in the scuppers. He dragged this man to the side of the ship, but finding there was no raft or boat alongside, put a lifebelt around him and threw him overboard. When he was satisfied that there were no further survivors the Chief Officer jumped overboard and swam to a raft which, under his direction, returned to pick up the injured greaser. In the full knowledge that she was likely to blow up at any moment Chief Officer Stronach stayed on this burning vessel searching for survivors for an hour and twenty minutes. His inspiring leadership induced a number of the crew to get away and so saved their lives and by his gallant efforts, undertaken with utter disregard of his personal safety, he saved the lives of three officers and a greaser, all of whom were badly hurt. His action equals any in the annals of the Merchant Navy for great and unselfish heroism and determination in the face of overwhelming odds.

— London Gazette

These awards are held onboard HQS Wellington, berthed on the Victoria Embankment in London.
