= Thomas Alderson =

Recipient of the George Cross

- Born: 15 September 1903; Sunderland, England
- Died: 28 October 1965 (aged 62)
- Military career
- Allegiance: United Kingdom
- Branch: Air Raid Precautions
- Rank: Detachment Leader
- Conflicts: Second World War
- Awards: George Cross
- Other work: Marine and local authority engineer

Thomas Hopper Alderson, GC (15 September 1903 – 28 October 1965) was a British Air Raid Precautions (ARP) warden in Bridlington, and the first person to be directly awarded the George Cross (GC) shortly after its creation in 1940.

Born in Sunderland, Alderson was educated in West Hartlepool. After leaving school at 15, he joined the Merchant Navy as an engineer but gave up seafaring in 1935. He worked in Bridlington at the time of the Second World War, where he was an Air Raid Warden. His GC was awarded to recognise his bravery in rescuing civilians trapped in bombed out buildings. After the war, he served in the Civil Defence Corps. He died of cancer in Driffield, aged 62.

== Early life ==
Born on 15 September 1903 at Ashburne Stables, Sunderland, Alderson was the fifth of six children of domestic coachman Thomas Alderson (1864–1945) and Sarah Annie (1872–1942), née Hopper. He went first to his local village school and then to Elwick Road senior boys' school, West Hartlepool, becoming Head Boy. During World War I he was present at the bombardment of West Hartlepool by the German High Seas Fleet on 16 December 1914.

== Career ==
After leaving school at 15, Alderson first worked as an office boy and then a draughtsman, before undertaking an engineering apprenticeship. He joined the Merchant Navy, becoming a first engineer. On 23 December 1932, he married Irene Doris (1899–1991), the daughter of agent Frederick R. A. Johnson, of West Hartlepool. Following the birth of his daughter in 1935 he became an engineer for West Hartlepool council. He also taught technical drawing at a night school for extra income. He moved to Bridlington in 1938 as works supervisor for the Bridlington Corporation. Local authorities were responsible for air raid precautions and trained their own workforces in rescue work. Alderson attended an anti-gas school at Easingwold, near York, and became an instructor in the subject.

== Second World War ==
Alderson worked as a part-time Air Raid Warden during the Second World War, leading a detachment of rescue and demolition parties in Bridlington. The coastal town was soon attacked by Luftwaffe bombers, and residential areas were hit. On three occasions in August 1940, Alderson led rescue teams and entered dangerous buildings to rescue trapped civilians. For his work, he was awarded the newly-instituted George Cross. It had been created to recognise acts of bravery in non-battle situations. The citation, published in The London Gazette, read:

A pair of semi-detached houses at Bridlington was totally demolished in a recent air raid. One woman was trapped alive. Alderson tunnelled under unsafe wreckage and rescued the trapped person without further injury to her. Some days later, two five-storey buildings were totally demolished and debris penetrated into a cellar in which eleven persons were trapped. Six persons in one cellar, which had completely given way, were buried under debris. Alderson partly effected the entrance to this cellar by tunnelling 13 to 14 feet under the main heap of wreckage and for three and a half hours he worked unceasingly in an exceedingly cramped condition. Although considerably bruised he succeeded in releasing all the trapped persons without further injury to themselves. The wreckage was unsafe and further falls were anticipated; coal gas leaks were of a serious nature and there was danger of flooding from fractured water pipes. Despite these dangers and enemy aircraft overhead the rescue work was continued. On a third occasion, some four-storey buildings were totally demolished. Five persons were trapped in a cellar. Alderson led the rescue work in excavating a tunnel from the pavement through the foundations to the cellar; he also personally tunnelled under the wreckage many feet into the cellar and rescued alive two persons (one of whom subsequently died) from under a massive refrigerator, which was in danger of further collapse as debris was removed. A wall, three stories high, which swayed in the gusty wind, was directly over the position where the rescue party were working. This was likely to collapse at any moment. Alderson worked almost continuously under the wreckage for five hours, during which time further air raid warnings were received and enemy aircraft heard overhead. By his courage and devotion to duty without the slightest regard for his own safety, he set a fine example to the members of his Rescue Party, and their teamwork is worthy of the highest praise.

He was the first person to receive the GC from King George VI, and in a radio broadcast at the time insisted that his award was for all the rescue parties in Bridlington.

== Later life ==
In 1946, Alderson joined the East Riding of Yorkshire County Council workforce as an assistant highways surveyor. He then joined the new Civil Defence Corps, this time to protect the civilian population from nuclear warfare, rather than conventional bombs. On 28 October 1965 he died of lung cancer in Northfield Hospital at Driffield, Yorkshire. His George Cross is now on display at the Imperial War Museum alongside a medal from the RSPCA, awarded later in the war for rescuing two horses from a burning stable.

== See also ==
- List of George Cross recipients
