= William Taylor (Royal Navy officer, born 1908) =

William Horace Taylor
- Born: 28 October 1908; Manchester, England
- Died: 16 January 1999 (aged 90); Aberdeen, Scotland
- Military career
- Allegiance: United Kingdom
- Branch: Royal Naval Volunteer Reserve
- Service years: 1939–1963
- Rank: Lieutenant Commander
- Unit: HMS President
- Conflicts: Second World War: The Blitz
- Awards: George Cross; Member of the Order of the British Empire; King's Commendation for Brave Conduct

William Horace Taylor, GC, MBE (28 October 1908 – 16 January 1999) was an officer in the Royal Naval Volunteer Reserve who was awarded the George Cross for the gallantry he displayed in bomb disposal work in September and October 1940 during the Second World War.

== George Cross ==
Taylor was a probationary temporary sub-lieutenant defusing unexploded enemy bombs in September and October 1940. In particular, he defused a bomb at an RAF depot in Uxbridge.

Notice of his award appeared in the London Gazette on 14 January 1941, reading:

The King has been graciously pleased to approve the award of the GEORGE CROSS for great gallantry and undaunted devotion to duty to: —
Probationary Temporary Sub-Lieutenant William Horace Taylor, R.N.V.R.
