= Cy Gray =

Recipient of the George Cross

Roderick Borden Gray
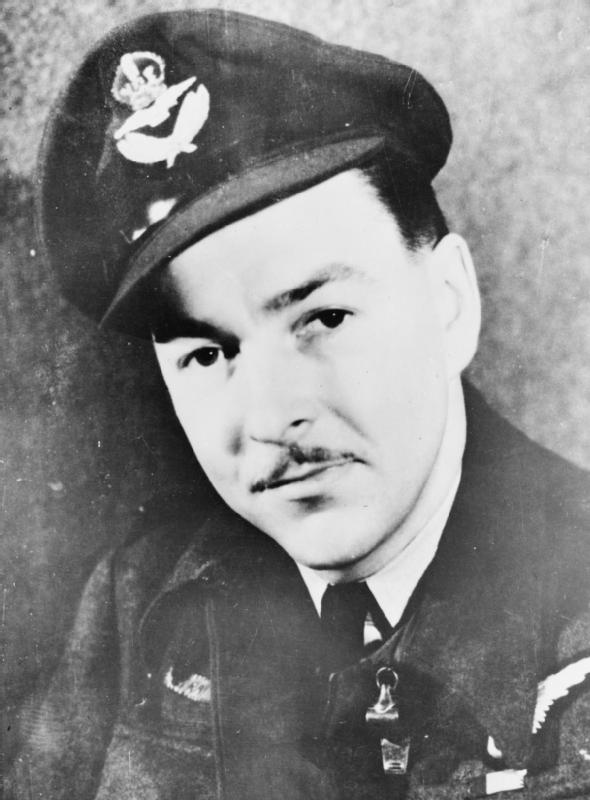
- Born: 2 October 1917; Sault Ste. Marie, Ontario, Canada
- Died: 27 August 1944 (aged 26)
- Military career
- Allegiance: Canada
- Branch: Royal Canadian Air Force
- Rank: Flying Officer
- Service number: J/13979
- Unit: No. 172 Squadron RAF
- Conflicts: Second World War
- Awards: George Cross

Roderick Borden Gray, GC (2 October 1917 – 27 August 1944), known as Cy Gray, was a pilot in the Royal Canadian Air Force and a posthumous recipient of the George Cross for his self-sacrifice in putting the lives of his comrades ahead of his own.

== Second World War ==
Flying Officer Gray was attached to No. 172 Squadron RAF flying Vickers Wellington bombers on anti-submarine patrols. On the night of 26/27 August 1944 his Wellington bomber attacked the Type IXC/40 U-534 in the Bay of Biscay. Anti aircraft return fire from the U boat brought the Wellington down into the sea. The surviving four members of the Wellington crew had only a single man dinghy between them, he helped two wounded crewmen into a dinghy but refused to climb aboard it himself, fearing it would capsize and imperil them all. Despite his own severe injuries he clung to the side of the dinghy instead, losing consciousness after several hours in the frigid water and drowning. His colleagues were eventually rescued by a Sunderland flying boat of No. 10 Squadron RAAF after 15 hours in the water and their account prompted the award. He was originally nominated for the Albert Medal. Notice of his award appeared in the London Gazette on 13 March 1945.

The 155 Royal Canadian Air Cadet Squadron is named in his honour.
