= Simmon Latutin =

Recipient of the George Cross

Simmon Latutin GC
- Born: 25 July 1916; Camden Town, London
- Died: 30 December 1944 (aged 28); Mogadishu, Somaliland
- Military career
- Allegiance: United Kingdom
- Branch: British Army
- Service years: 1940–1944
- Rank: Captain
- Service number: 242974
- Unit: Somalia Gendarmerie
- Conflicts: World War II
- Awards: George Cross

Captain Simmon Latutin GC (25 July 1916 – 30 December 1944) was a British Army officer who was posthumously awarded the George Cross, the highest British (and Commonwealth) award for bravery out of combat. He won his award for the gallantry he showed in rescuing two comrades, and attempting to save a boy, from a blazing ammunition store on 29 December 1944 in Mogadishu, Somaliland.

== Early life ==
Latutin (Note: His first name is recorded as Simions both in 1916 and 1939) was born in Camden Town, London on 25 July 1916, the son of Jewish immigrants, Morris and Frieda Latutin. His father was a Tailor. In the 1939 National Register he is living with his parents in the St Pancras district of London, his occupation is recorded as a Musician.

== Army service ==
He was commissioned into The Somerset Light Infantry in 1942, and was seconded to the Somalia Gendarmerie at the time of his GC action. He died of his burns the next day. He was born on 25 July 1916 in London and had been educated at Regent Street Polytechnic and the Royal Academy of Music, where a memorial to him was unveiled in 2006. Notice of his award appeared in a supplement to the London Gazette of 6 September 1946, dated 10 September 1946. He is buried in the Nairobi War Cemetery. In December 2021 a plaque in his memory was installed on the wall of his Camden home by the Jewish American Society for Historic Preservation.

== George Cross citation ==
Latutin's George Cross citation appeared in the London Gazette on 6 August 1946:

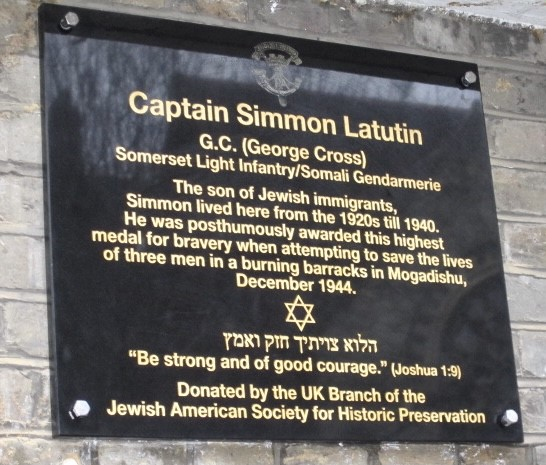
Captain Simmon Latutin, George Cross (Somerset Light Infantry/Somali Gendarmerie)

The King has been graciously pleased to approve the posthumous award of the George Cross in recognition of most conspicuous gallantry in carrying out hazardous work in a very brave manner to Captain Simmon Latutin 242974 Somalia Gendarmerie (Harrow Middlesex).

— London Gazette

Historical marker was placed at the home where Latutin lived in London by the Jewish American Society for Historic Preservation U.K. Branch.

== See also ==
- List of George Cross recipients
- The Jewish Historical Society of England, issue 2009, has a detailed article on Simmon Latutin by Martin Sugarman, Archivist of the Association of Jewish Ex-Servicemen and Women of the UK – AJEX – Jewish Military Museum.
- Comprehensive Guide to the Victoria and George Cross recipients
