= Wilson Charlton =

Wilson Hodgson Charlton
- Born: 9 April 1907; Consett, England
- Died: 12 May 1953 (aged 46); Wandsworth, England
- Military career
- Allegiance: United Kingdom
- Branch: Royal Air Force
- Service years: 1926 – 1953
- Rank: Squadron leader
- Nickname: "Bombs"
- Service number: 44387
- Commands: Bomb Disposal 5134 Squadron (1946–48)
- Conflicts: Second World War: Battle of Britain
- Awards: George Cross

Wilson Hodgson Charlton, GC (9 April 1907 – 12 May 1953) was a Royal Air Force (RAF) officer who was awarded the George Cross for his bomb disposal work during the Second World War.

== Bomb disposal ==
During September and October 1940 he dealt with over 200 unexploded devices—on average working on three live bombs per day. He worked at aerodromes and factories in and around Wiltshire and Gloucestershire.

Notice of his award appeared in the London Gazette on 21 January 1941.

Flight Lieutenant Charlton is responsible for all work in connection with enemy bombs in an area comprising the greater part of two counties. Both by day and night, during recent months, he has dealt with some 200 unexploded bombs. He has successfully undertaken many dangerous missions with undaunted and unfailing courage.

== Later war service ==
Charlton was sent as a bomb disposal trainer to Asia and was captured by the Japanese in 1942.

== Sale of medals ==
Charlton's medals (including a 1939–1945 Star, a Pacific Star, and Long Service and Good Conduct Medal) were sold at auction on 5 December 2012. They had an estimate of £25,000 but sold for £58,000.
