= William John Button =

British soldier

- Born: 30 November 1903; Bath, Somerset, England
- Died: 10 March 1969 (aged 65); Bath, Somerset, England
- Military career
- Allegiance: British
- Branch: Army
- Service years: 1921-
- Rank: Lance-Sergeant
- Service number: 737038
- Unit: Royal Engineers
- Awards: Empire Gallantry Medal

William John Button (30 November 1903 – 10 March 1969) was a British soldier and one of the last recipients of the Empire Gallantry Medal before this award was superseded by the George Cross.

In 1940, Button was a Lance-Sergeant in the Royal Engineers and was section leader of number 48 Bomb Disposal Section. On 18 August 1940 L/Sgt Button and his men were excavating an unexploded bomb which had been dropped some days earlier. While the section were digging the bomb exploded. Despite being injured himself Button's first concern was for his men and he ensured that the rest of the section were safe and accounted for before summoning help.

Button was recommended for an award and the award of the Empire Gallantry Medal was published in the London Gazette on 17 September 1940. The citation read:

On the morning of 18th August, 1940, Lance-Sergeant Button was ordered with his section to continue the work of excavating an unexploded bomb. Although he knew well that, owing to the time already spent on excavation the bomb was liable to explode at any moment, he continued the work of his section with great coolness. The bomb eventually exploded, killing five sappers of the Section, and throwing Lance-Sergeant Button a considerable distance. Although considerably shaken he behaved with great coolness, collected the rest of his Section at a safe distance, ascertained that none of them was injured, notified the First Aid Detachment, and reported to his Section Officer by telephone.

— "No. 34947". The London Gazette. 17 September 1940. p. 5538.

Button's award together with those awarded to fellow Royal Engineer Bomb Disposal personnel, Lt Edward Reynolds, 2nd Lt Ellis Talbot and 2nd Lt Wallace Andrews, were the last awards made of the Empire Gallantry Medal. On 24 September 1940 King George VI initiated the George Cross (GC) and the first awards of the GC were published in the London Gazette on 30 September 1940. Under the terms of the Royal Warrant for the GC, all EGMs were exchanged for a GC.
