= Roy Harris (British Army soldier) =

George Cross recipient in World War II

Roy Thomas Harris
- Born: 1 August 1902; Cardiff, Wales
- Died: 18 August 1973 (aged 71); Wolverhampton, England
- Military career
- Allegiance: United Kingdom
- Branch: British Army
- Service years: 1939–1945
- Rank: ARP Officer
- Unit: ARP
- Conflicts: Second World War: The Blitz
- Awards: George Cross; Mentioned in dispatches

Roy Thomas Harris, GC (1 August 1902 – 18 August 1973) was an Air Raid Precautions officer who was awarded the George Cross for the "conspicuous gallantry" he displayed in defusing unexploded bombs that had fallen on Langdale Road in Thornton Heath, Surrey, during the Second World War.

He later joined the Royal Engineers where he reached the rank of Hon. Major.

== George Cross ==
While working as the Chief Combustion Engineer to Croydon Corporation, Harris was serving as a captain in The Queen's Royal Regiment, attached to the Croydon Home Guard.

On the night of 17/18 September, a Luftwaffe bombing raid had resulted in a number of unexploded devices being found at a school on Langdale Road in Thornton Heath, Surrey. Harris proceeded to the school to defuse the bombs and save the school from certain destruction.

Harris's George Cross citation appeared in the London Gazette on 17 December 1940:

The King has been graciously pleased to approve the award of the George Cross to: –

Roy T. Harris, Staff Officer, A.R.P. Engineers Service, Croydon.

For conspicuous bravery in carrying out dangerous duties.
