= Albert Hemming =

Albert Edward Heming (13 June 1910 – 3 January 1987) was awarded the George Cross for the heroism displayed on 2 March 1945 in Parkers Row in Bermondsey, London when he dug a trapped priest from the ruins of a bombed Catholic Church. He was a section leader in the Civil Defence Rescue Service at the time. Notice of his award appeared in the London Gazette on 17 July 1945.
