= Doreen Ashburnham-Ruffner =

British winner of a bravery award

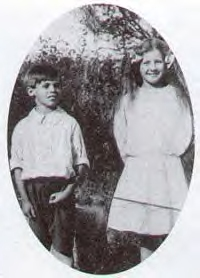
- Born: Doreen Ashburnham; 13 May 1905
- Died: 4 October 1991 (aged 86)
- Known for: Saving the life of a friend

Doreen Ashburnham-Ruffner, GC (13 May 1905 – 4 October 1991) was the youngest British female recipient of the Albert Medal which later became the George Cross.

Doreen Ashburnham was the granddaughter of Sir Anchitel Ashburnham, the eighth baronet of Broomham, Sussex. In adulthood she moved to California and became a member of the first women's polo team. She later moved to Italy to breed horses, and took the name Ruffner after she married and became a US Citizen in 1942.

== Albert Medal ==
On 23 September 1916, Ashburnham was walking with her eight-year old friend Anthony Farrer on Vancouver Island when they were attacked by a 180lb mountain lion. She said of the attack: "The cougar sprang from about 35ft and landed on my back, throwing me forward on to my face. He chewed on my shoulder and bit chunks off my butt. Tony attacked him with a bridle that he was carrying. They fought for 200 yards down the trail. The cougar scratched the skin off Tony's back and ripped the flesh off his scalp. His scalp was hanging off the back of his head by six hairs."

Citation:

The KING has been pleased to award the Albert Medal to Doreen Ashburnham, aged 11 years, and Anthony Farrer, aged 8 years, residing at Cowichan Lake, Vancouver Island, in recognition of the great bravery displayed by the children in the following circumstances:– On the 23rd September, 1916, the two children left their homes at Cowichan Lake for the purpose of catching their ponies and, when about half a mile from home, they were attacked by a cougar. They were almost upon the animal before they saw it crouching in a path at a corner. The little girl was first attacked; the cougar sprang upon her, and she was knocked down with her face to the ground, the animal being on her back. The boy at once attacked the cougar with his fists and riding bridle, and drove the animal off the girl; it then attacked him, and his companion, getting to her feet, came to the rescue, fighting with her clenched hands and bridle, and even putting her arm into the cougar’s mouth, to try to prevent it from biting Anthony. She succeeded in getting it off the boy, and it stood on its hind quarters and fought with her, but evidently it was disturbed by some sound, for presently it slunk away and ran under a log, where it was afterwards killed. The children, though both badly injured, were able to make their way home. The cougar measured over 7 feet from nose to tip of tail.

As the Albert Medal was replaced by the George Cross in 1971, Ashburnham's post-nominal letters changed from AM to GC at that time.
