= Harry Silk =

Recipient of the George Cross

Joseph Henry Silk
- Born: 14 August 1916; London, England
- Died: 4 December 1943 (aged 27); Burma
- Burial place: Taukkyan War Cemetery
- Military career
- Allegiance: United Kingdom
- Branch: British Army
- Rank: Private
- Nickname: "Harry"
- Service number: 5625234
- Unit: Somerset Light Infantry
- Conflicts: Second World War: Burma campaign; Burma campaign 1943 †
- Awards: George Cross

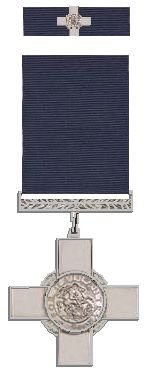
George Cross and its ribbon bar.

Private Joseph Henry Silk GC (14 August 1916 − 4 December 1943), of the Somerset Light Infantry was posthumously awarded the George Cross (GC) for his heroic self-sacrifice while serving in Burma (now Myanmar) during the Burma campaign of 1942−1943 of the Second World War.

During training Silk threw himself on an accidentally triggered grenade to save his comrades from the explosion which killed him instantly.

Notice of his award appeared in The London Gazette on 13 June 1944.
