= Leonard Miles =

Leonard James Miles GC
- Born: 27 January 1904; West Ham, London, England
- Died: 22 September 1940 (aged 36); Ilford, Essex, England
- Burial place: City of London Cemetery and Crematorium, Newham
- Military career
- Allegiance: United Kingdom
- Branch: Civil Defence Service ARP
- Conflicts: World War II * The Blitz
- Awards: George Cross

Leonard James Miles GC (27 January 1904 – 21 September 1940) was an Air Raid Precautions warden who was posthumously awarded a George Cross for the gallantry he showed in leaving his air raid shelter to warn others of a nearby unexploded bomb in Hainault in Essex on 21 September 1940. He was by trade a building contractor. (Note: In the National Register taken on 29 September 1939 he was described as a "Librarian")

== 21/22 September 1940 ==
ARP Warden Leonard Miles was on duty on the night of 21/22 September 1940 when a Luftwaffe air raid on Ilford commenced. James observed that a parachute mine was falling near his home on Lime Grove, in Hainault, East London. Though he could have safely retreated to a public shelter, he ran towards the danger, in order to warn some people, whom he knew to be in their houses.

Miles was mortally wounded when the mine exploded, but was still conscious, but refused first aid from another warden. He instructed that a nearby fire which had been caused by a broken gas main be attended to first.

He was taken to the King George Hospital in Ilford but died about 24 hours later. He was cremated on 26 September 1940, and his ashes were scattered in the City of London Cemetery on the same day.

== George Cross citation ==
Notice of his award appeared in The London Gazette on 17 January 1941.
