= Leonard Harrison (RAF officer) =

Recipient of the George Cross

- Born: 6 January 1905; Devonport, Plymouth
- Died: 15 July 1989 (aged 84); Bexley, London
- Military career
- Allegiance: United Kingdom
- Branch: Royal Air Force
- Service years: 1922–1949
- Rank: Wing commander
- Conflicts: Second World War
- Awards: George Cross

Leonard Henry Harrison (6 January 1905 – 15 July 1989) was a Royal Air Force (RAF) officer who was awarded the George Cross "for acts of exceptional coolness and courage on several occasions" in defusing unexploded German bombs during the Second World War. Having joined the RAF in 1922, he served as Civilian Armament Instructor at a RAF armament training school in 1940 and was an authority on explosive fuse systems. He used this expertise to render many munitions safe, including a bomb with a previously unknown fuse that had lodged in the deck of a grain carrier which struggled into Immingham Docks, which he defused with Flight Lieutenant John Noel Dowland. He also defused a device on a fishing boat in the Humber. His award was published in the London Gazette and was also covered by the Saturday News Chronicle of 4 January 1941.

== Early life and career ==
Born in Devonport, he was in the RAF for 12 years before entering the reserve.

== Second World War ==
In 1941, he was given a commission on probation as an acting pilot officer. This was subsequently confirmed and he was made up to flying officer in May 1942. Promotion to the rank of flight lieutenant followed in 1944.

He was part of a scheme to booby trap captured fuses and smuggle them into German ammunition stores so that bombs would exploded when being dropped, so destroying the enemy aircraft. The Germans discovered the scheme but were forced to destroy large numbers of fuses as a precaution. He served as honorary treasurer of the Victoria Cross and George Cross Association.

Harrison retired with the rank of wing commander in 1949, but remained in civilian appointments with the Air Ministry until 1970. He died on 15 July 1989, leaving a son, Leonard Jnr, and a daughter, Pat.
