= Albert Dolphin =

Recipient of the George Cross

Albert George Dolphin
- Born: 15 January 1896
- Died: 7 September 1940 (aged 44)
- Known for: Posthumously awarded the George Cross for heroism

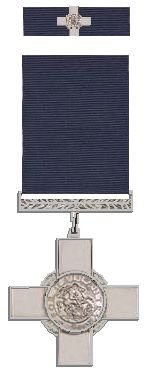
George Cross and its ribbon bar

Albert George Dolphin (15 January 1896 – 7 September 1940) was posthumously awarded the George Cross for the heroism he displayed on 7 September 1940. He was working as an emergency hospital porter when a bomb fell on kitchens at the South Eastern Hospital (now the New Cross Hospital), killing four nurses and injuring others. Dolphin hurried to rescue a nurse who was trapped by fallen masonry and threw himself across her to protect her as a damaged wall gave way. Dolphin was killed, aged 44, but the nurse, though severely injured, survived due to his action. The award was noted in The London Gazette of 17 January 1941.
