= Edmund Abbott =

Royal Navy officer (1895–1974)

- Born: 20 July 1895; Northwood, Middlesex
- Died: 3 April 1974 (aged 78); Crowthorne, Berkshire
- Military career
- Allegiance: United Kingdom
- Branch: Royal Navy
- Service years: 1908–1948
- Rank: Captain
- Nickname: "Bill"
- Commands: Naval Base Simon's Town (1946–48); HMS Ceres (1939–41); HMS Harrier (1935–37)
- Conflicts: First World War; Second World War
- Awards: George Cross; Mentioned in Despatches

Captain Edmund Geoffrey Abbott, GC (20 July 1895 – 3 April 1974) was a Royal Navy officer and recipient of the Albert Medal, later exchanged for the George Cross.

Abbott was promoted to captain on 5 July 1939.

== Albert Medal ==
On 12 March 1920, Abbott was gazetted for his actions on 5 August 1919. His citation read:

The KING has been graciously pleased to approve of the award of the Albert Medal to Lieutenant Edmund Geoffrey Abbott, R.N., for gallantry in saving life at sea.

The following is an account of the services in respect of which the decoration has been conferred:-

On the 5th August, 1919, an explosion occurred on board the ex-German battleship "Baden" whilst in dry dock at Invergordon.

Lieutenant Abbott immediately proceeded down the hatch to the main deck and saw that smoke was coming from the ladder way tunnel leading down to the shaft passage and after room containing the cooling plant.

Other measures proving ineffectual, he proceeded to the corresponding tunnel on the star-board side, to see whether it was possible to get below and work up to the scene of the explosion from that side.

The starboard tunnel was practically clear of smoke, so he proceeded to the upper deck, collected a party, and descended again through the tunnel to the room containing the cooling plant. He made his way to the port side and found a dockyard workman lying unconscious. Assisted by the party which has accompanied him, Lieutenant Abbott for the body to the upper deck, but life was found to be extinct.

Although greatly affected by the fumes, Lieutenant Abbott called for further volunteers and again proceeded to the rescue of a second man whose groans had been heard, and succeeded in removing him out of danger.

Throughout the proceedings, this officer showed an utter disregard for his own safety, and, in spite of the great difficulty occasioned by the absence of light, was the undoubted means of saving the second man's life.

As the Albert Medal was replaced by the George Cross in 1971, Abbott's post-nominal letters changed from AM to GC at that time.
