= Subramanian (GC) =

Indian recipient of the George Cross

- Born: 18 December 1912; Ottivakkam, India
- Died: 24 February 1944 (aged 31); Mignano Monte Lungo, Italy
- Burial place: Sangro River Cremation Memorial
- Military career
- Allegiance: British India
- Branch: British Indian Army
- Rank: Subedar
- Service number: 14069
- Unit: Queen Victoria's Own Madras Sappers and Miners
- Conflicts: Second World War; Italian campaign
- Awards: George Cross; Indian Distinguished Service Medal

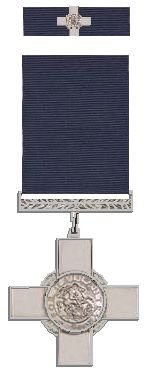
George Cross and its ribbon bar

Subedar Subramanian, GC, IDSM (18 December 1912 – 24 February 1944) was the first Indian to be awarded the George Cross.

Subramanian served with Queen Victoria's Own Madras Sappers and Miners, a unit of the Indian Army, during the Second World War. On 24 February 1944, during the Allied campaign in Italy he won the George Cross at Mignano by throwing himself onto a mine about to detonate and thus successfully protecting others from the blast. His award was gazetted posthumously on 30 June 1944. He was also awarded the Indian Distinguished Service Medal.
