= Islam-ud-Din =

Recipient of the George Cross

- Born: c. 1925; Montgomery, British India (now Sahiwal, Pakistan)
- Died: 12 April 1945 (aged 19 or 20); Pyawbwe, Burma
- Military career
- Allegiance: British India
- Branch: British Indian Army
- Rank: Lance-Naik
- Units: 6th Battalion, 9th Jat Regiment
- Conflicts: Second World War; Burma campaign
- Awards: George Cross

Lance-Naik Islam-ud-Din, GC (c. 1925 – 12 April 1945) was a soldier of the British Indian Army during the Second World War, who was posthumously awarded the George Cross for sacrificing his own life to save others. He was serving in the 6th Battalion, 9th Jat Regiment, when on 12 April 1945 at Pyawbwe, central Burma, a live grenade went astray and threatened to cause a large number of casualties in his unit. Islam-ud-Din threw himself on the grenade at once, showing no hesitation. Saving the lives of his comrades, he was killed instantly, aged only 19 or 20 and leaving behind a widow in India. He was described as steadfastly courageous and a good leader by his superior officers after his death. The award was gazetted on 5 October 1945.
