= Edward Medal =

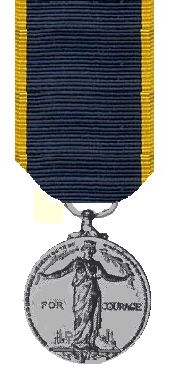
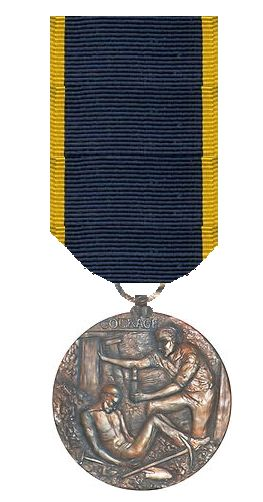
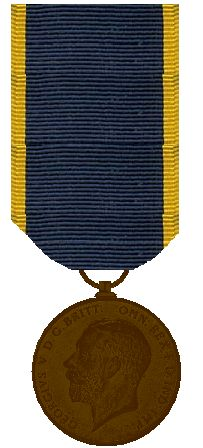
- Reverse of the Edward Medal (Industry) Class I (left). Reverse of Edward Medal (Mines) Class II (centre). Obverse of the Edward Medal Class II (right).
- Type: Civilian decoration
- Awarded for: Acts of bravery by miners, quarrymen and industrial workers in mines and factory accidents and disasters.
- Presented by: United Kingdom and some British Empire/Commonwealth countries
- Eligibility: United Kingdom and British Empire/Commonwealth personnel
- Post-nominals: EM
- Status: Discontinued; Replaced by George Cross in 1971.
- Established: 13 July 1907

Highlights
- Total: Mines : 395 (77 silver, 318 bronze) Industry : 188 (25 silver, 163 bronze)
- Total awarded posthumously: Yes
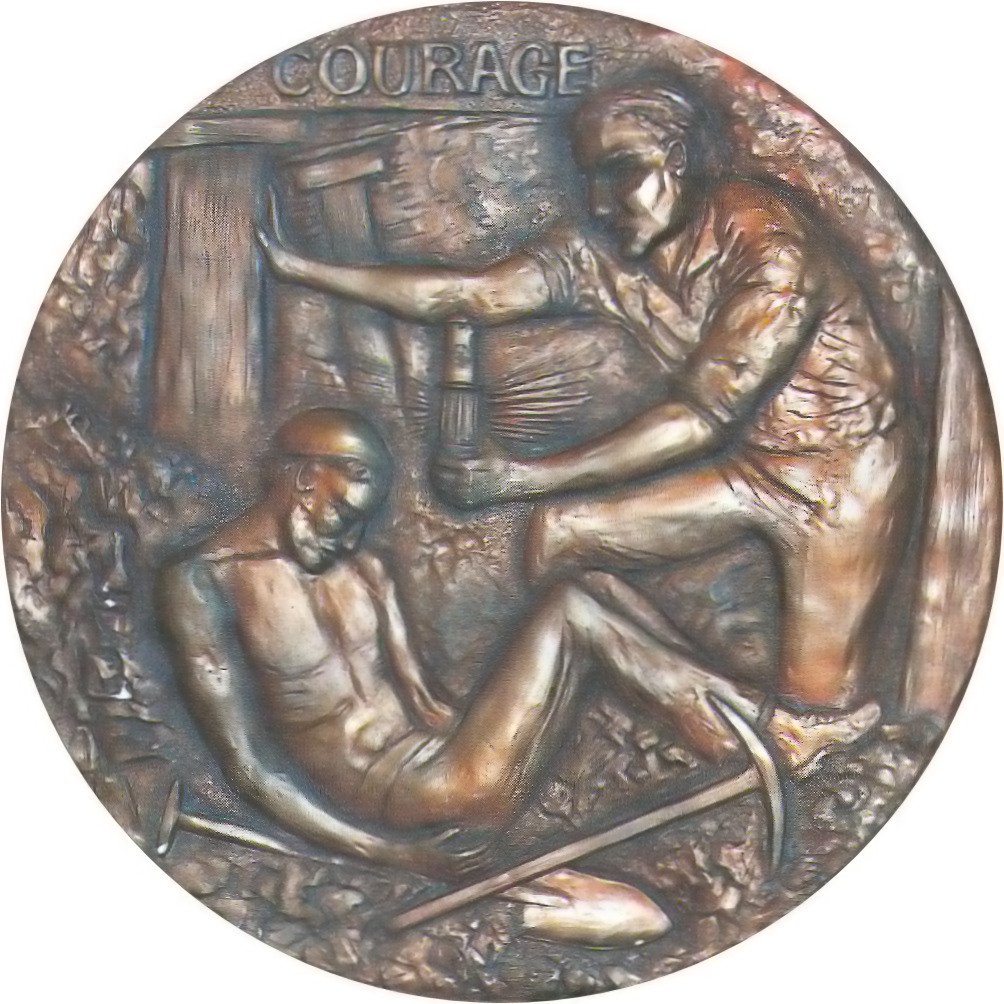
- Edward Medal

Precedence
- Equivalent: George Cross (for civil gallantry or military actions not in the face of the enemy)

The Edward Medal was a British civilian decoration which was instituted by royal warrant on 13 July 1907 to recognise acts of bravery of miners and quarrymen in endangering their lives to rescue their fellow workers. The medal was named in honour of King Edward VII. The original royal warrant was amended by a further royal warrant on 1 December 1909 to encompass acts of bravery by all industrial workers in factory accidents and disasters, creating two versions of the Edward Medal: Mines and Industry.

In both cases (Mines and Industry), the medal was divided in two grades: first class (silver) and second class (bronze), with the medal being a circular silver or bronze medal (as appropriate to the class awarded) suspended from a ribbon 1 3/8" wide and coloured dark blue and edged with yellow. The medal associated with mines depicted colliers at work whilst the industry medal had a female figure with an industrial complex in the background. Peculiarly, the cost of the Edward Medal (Mines) was borne by a fund established by a group of philanthropists (including prominent mine owners) and not the state.

The Edward Medal (Mines) was awarded only 395 times (77 silver and 318 bronze) and the Edward Medal (Industry) only 188 times (25 silver and 163 bronze, of which only two were awarded to women), making the Edward Medal one of the rarest British gallantry awards. Only posthumous awards were made after 1949, and the Edward Medal (Industry) (1st class) was not awarded after 1948.

The Edward Medal was discontinued in 1971, when surviving recipients of the Edward Medal (along with holders of the Albert Medal) were invited to exchange their award for the George Cross. Nine (2 silver, 7 bronze) elected not to exchange their medals.
