= List of recipients of the Order of Industrial Heroism =

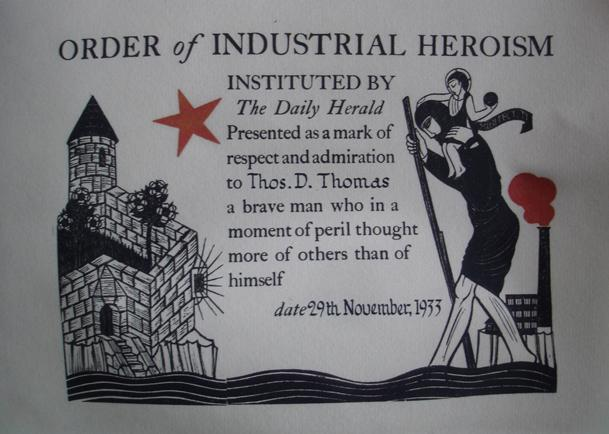
'Order of Industrial Heroism' certificate awarded to Thomas "Derwydd" Thomas in 1933. Features a 1923 woodcut design by Eric Gill.

The list of recipients of the Order of Industrial Heroism (OIH) contains 440 recipients, who received awards between its inception in 1923 and dissolution in 1964.

Sometimes there were multiple awards relating to one event; six of the awards were to miners' union lodges, rather than individuals, where a large number of members had been involved in mine rescues. Only one of the solo awardees was a woman; another received one alongside three men.

No.	Name	Occupation	Residence	Incident date	Presentation venue	Presentation date	Further info.
1	Joseph Sloss	Dock worker	Aigburth, Liverpool		Liverpool Stadium	30 September 1923	Put out a fire beneath railway wagons containing picric acid, thereby preventing a major explosion.
2	Michael Lavan	Dock worker	Bootle		Liverpool Stadium	30 September 1923	Put out a fire beneath railway wagons containing picric acid, thereby preventing a major explosion.
3	Joshua Bamber	Dock worker	Bootle		Liverpool Stadium	30 September 1923	Put out a fire beneath railway wagons containing picric acid, thereby preventing a major explosion.
4	Thomas Pinnington	Dock worker	Walton, Liverpool		Liverpool Stadium	30 September 1923	Put out a fire beneath railway wagons containing picric acid, thereby preventing a major explosion.
5	John William Shippey	Fisherman	Bridlington	1 June 1923	Glass Dome Spa, Bridlington	3 October 1923	Saved the crew of the Mistletoe, a motorboat which was on fire off Spurn Point. Was badly burned carrying a can of burning petrol from below decks.
6	Fred Davies	Train driver	Manchester		Beswick Co-operative Hall, Longsight	14 October 1923	Brought his train to a safe stop despite being badly scalded in a boiler blow-back. Presented by George Lansbury, MP.
7	Wilfred Westoe	Collier (coal hewer)	Burnopfield, Durham	27 October 1923	Pavilion Theatre, Burnopfield	27 April 1924	Rescued an injured miner by cerawling through a narrow gap, at South Garesfield Colliery.
8	Nicholas A. Nugent	Shipwright apprentice		December 1923	Pavilion, Southampton Pier	1 May 1924	For a "man overboard" rescue from ice-cold water, while working for Harland and Wolff, on Briton, a steamer.
9	Harold Aston	Workman	Llanelly		Llanelly Market Hall	1 June 1924	Rescued a colleague from the collapsing roof of Llanelly Copper Works.
10	A.H. Sutton	Train driver		3 April 1924	Attercliffe, Sheffield	13 July 1924	Drove his train ahead of a runaway train, gradually bringing them together and then to a stop.
11	Surtees Jobling	Collier (mine deputy)	Walker		Borough Theatre, Wallsend	20 July 1924	Rescued two unconscious men from a gas-filled underground road at Wallsend G Pit.
12	Thomas Willetts	Collier	Royston		Miners' Gala, Royston	21 August 1924	Rescued a man buried by an ongoing rock fall at a mine pit, despite being restricted to 'light duties' by ill health.
13	James Horn	Collier	Hartford		Shankhouse Co-operative Hall	6 September 1924	Pulled a man away from under a falling rock, at great risk to his own life.
14	George Bowles	Railway fireman	Forrest Gate		Ewen Hall, Barnet	11 September 1924	Brought a runway High Barnet to Moorgate train safely to a halt, despite being badly burned by an engine blow-back.
15	Samuel Whitfield		Birtley		Co-operative Hall, Birtley	13 October 1924	
16	Edward Thompson						
17	William Walker Forrester	Tram driver	Hanley	18 February 1924			Severely injured after staying at the controls of a tram whose brakes had failed, in an effort to stop it as it ran downhill. Award presented by Ernest Bevin.
18	Paling Baker	Colliery manager	Harriseahead		Kidsgrove Town Hall	1 February 1925	also received the Edward Medal.
19	Harry Wilson	Collier	Mow Cop		Kidsgrove Town Hall	1 February 1925	also received the Edward Medal.
20	George Jones				Swansea	April 1925	Rescued colleagues from a flood at the Killan Colliery.
21	Samuel Jones	Collier			Leigh Labour Club	18 May 1925	Award presented by Joseph Tinker, M.P.
22	Joseph Shelton						
23	Samuel Stewart						
24	Robert Irving	Collier	Dalton	23 June 1925	Casuals Hall, Dalton	18 September 1925	
25	John Donnell		South Kirby		The Cinema, South Kirby	11 October 1925	
26	Herbert Eades		South Kirby		The Cinema, South Kirby	11 October 1925	
27	Vincent Elwick				Murton Colliery, Durham	12 October 1925	
28	George Wilson				Murton Colliery, Durham	12 October 1925	
29	Robert Pearson	Dyer and bleacher		11 July 1925	Stockport Town Hall	31 October 1925	For an attempted rescue at Marsland's bleach works. Presented by Arnold Townend MP. Also awarded the Edward Medal.
30	Philip Rodman						
31	Arthur Hatcher						
32	Arthur Flynn	Dock worker				1924	"...at the age of only 16 saved his colleague from drowning as he slipped and fell into the dock"
33	William H. Owen						
34	James Grimshaw		Radcliffe		Co-operative Hall, Radcliffe	6 March 1926	
35	Ernest Bowkett		Radcliffe		Co-operative Hall, Radcliffe	6 March 1926	
36	Fred Fairbrother		Radcliffe		Co-operative Hall, Radcliffe	6 March 1926	
37	Robert Davies		Little Lever, Farnworth		Co-operative Hall, Radcliffe	6 March 1926	
38	Bert Tanner	Hydraulic packer	Barry Island		Barry	18 July 1926	Presented by Albert Purcell, M.P. Also received the Edward Medal.
39	Gilbert T. Klee	Dock labourer	Barry Island		Barry	18 July 1926	Presented by Albert Purcell, M.P.
40	Ernest T. Johnson	Plumber					
41	John Jenkins						
42	William Lindon						
43	Joseph T. Brown						
44	No. 1 Marine Lodge	Union Lodge					
45	Tanfield Lea Lodge	Union Lodge					
46	William Shillito						
47	Alf Bluer	Collier	Royston		The Palace, Royston		Bluer, a former professional football player, rescued a pit boy after a roof fall, working for to hours to do so despite the threat of a further fall.
48	Morgan Morgan						
49	Charles Acock		West Ham		Public Hall, Canning Town	21 May 1928	
50	Peter Lawler		West Ham		Public Hall, Canning Town	21 May 1928	
51	W. Mowbray		West Ham		Public Hall, Canning Town	21 May 1928	
52	Archie Burton						
53	Thomas Ford		Blaengarw		Workman's Hall, Blaengarw	29 January 1929	
54	Henry Parry		Blaengarw		Workman's Hall, Blaengarw	29 January 1929	
55	Henry Charles Hamblin						
56	A. Burge Clarke	Railway fireman				1929	
57	George Johnstone						
58	Robert Richardson						
59	James Medlen	Collier			Linton and Woodhorn Miner's Hall, Ashington		
60	William Pickering Railway Crane Operator.						
61	South Garesfield Lodge	Union Lodge					
62	Walter Taylor						
63	Gelliceidrim Lodge	Union Lodge					
64	James Fletcher	Bus inspector				18 May 1930	Jumped from a moving bus to pull a child from in front of another bus, being injured in the process. Also served as chairman of the Sunderland Labour Party at the time.
65	Thomas Fleming	Painter (chargehand)	Newcastle		Beehive Co-op Hall, Workington	30 May 1930	Award for rescuing an unconscious colleague from high up a factory chimney. Also received the Edward Medal.
66	Nicholas Whitehead	Painter's labourer	Workington		Beehive Co-op Hall, Workington	30 May 1930	Award for rescuing an unconscious colleague from high up a factory chimney. Also received the Edward Medal.
67	W.H. Peters		Llay		The Flower Show at Llay	9 August 1930	
68	W. Ellis		Llay		The Flower Show at Llay	9 August 1930	
69	Thomas Caygill						
70	Joseph Bosley						
71	Frederick Scott						
72	Allen Moffat						
73	William Fox						
74	W.J. Ballam	Collier	Bentley	20 November 1931	Bentley	3 January 1932	For heroism in the 1931 Bentley Colliery Disaster.
75	Albert Huckerby	Collier	Bentley	20 November 1931	Bentley	3 January 1932	Posthumous; for heroism in the 1931 Bentley Colliery Disaster. Presented to his widow by Robert Williams of The Daily Herald.
76	Philip Yates	Collier	Bentley	20 November 1931	Bentley	3 January 1932	For heroism in the 1931 Bentley Colliery Disaster; also received the Edward Medal.
77	Thomas Hopkinson	Colliery ambulanceman	Bentley	20 November 1931	Bentley	3 January 1932	Posthumous; for heroism in the 1931 Bentley Colliery Disaster. Insisted on staying to give first aid to colleagues, despite being fatally injured by an underground explosion.
78	Fred Cordy		Llwynypia, Tonypandy		Tonypandy	21 February 1932	
79	Leonard Milton		Llwynypia, Tonypandy		Tonypandy	21 February 1932	
80	John Lewis		Tonypandy		Tonypandy	21 February 1932	
81	James Crompton						
82	Frederick Harding	Collier					Saved the lives of two boys working beside him, after an explosion, despite being badly burned himself.
83	Clarence Tomlinson						
84	Patrick Troy						
85	Robert Cornelius		Northam		Charity Hall, Southampton	3 February 1933	
86	Donald Stewart		Southampton		Charity Hall, Southampton	3 February 1933	
87	James William Sutton						
88	George Hutchison						
89	John William Smith						
90	Lewis Phillips	Collier		15 June 1933	Workmen's Institute, Pengam	5 November 1933	At great personal danger he rescued a fellow collier who was caught in revolving picks while cutting coal at Britannia Colliery.
91	John Thomas Kenyon						
92	Thomas "Derwydd" Thomas	Collier	Garnant		Public Hall, Brynamman	29 November 1933	Also received the Edward Medal.
93	D. Elwyn Davies	Collier	Brynamman		Public Hall, Brynamman	29 November 1933	
94	John Hambleton						
95	Thomas Berry						
96	Robert Jardine	Railway guard			Co-operative Hall, Carlisle		Award presented by Patrick Dollan.
97	Alexander Anderson	Engineer	South Shields			18 February 1935	Rescued a man from inside a burning tank aboard the steamer Laurelwood, and carried him up a ladder. Sustained burns in the process.
98	D. Calford						
99	E. Harrison		Garston		Winter Gardens, Garston	9 September 1935	
100	George James Radcliffe		Garston		Winter Gardens, Garston	9 September 1935	
101	D. Plumbley		Garston		Winter Gardens, Garston	9 September 1935	
102	A.G. Webster		Garston		Winter Gardens, Garston	9 September 1935	
103	H. Mason		Garston		Winter Gardens, Garston	9 September 1935	
104	Thomas Thoburn	Brewery worker	Sutton's Dwellings, Newcastle				Entered an ammonia-filled room in an attempt to rescue a colleague.
105	Frederick Woodhouse						
106	J. Morgan						
107	William Jackson						
108	J. Westwood						
109	Alfred George Gardiner						
110	Albert G. Turner		Canton, Cardiff		Cardiff Transport Hall	20 September 1936	
111	Clifford Davies		Cardiff		Cardiff Transport Hall	20 September 1936	
112	Walter G. Gould		Llantrisant		Cardiff Transport Hall	20 September 1936	
113	Wilfred Hatherley						
114	Donald H. McInnes		Grappenhall		Grappenhall Ex-Serviceman's Hall	30 November 1936	
115	Harold Harper		Warrington		Grappenhall Ex-Serviceman's Hall	30 November 1936	
116	Robert Butterworth						
117	Frederick J. Fox	Plater's helper		13 November 1936	Alexandra Hall, Cowes	21 January 1937	For a "man overboard" rescue, on the estuary of the River Medina.
118	P.J.F. Turner	Lorry driver					Had both legs amputated and was burned after he selflessly crashed his vehicle to avoid hitting a car which had pulled out in front of him.
119	Harold J. Wild						
120	Harold Godwin						
121	James Wilson						
122	G.W. Norman						
123	Cyril Wilde		Withington, Manchester		Beswick Co-op Socierty, Levenshulme	30 November 1937	
124	Philip Beeston		Cheadle, Manchester		Beswick Co-op Society, Levenshulme	30 November 1937	
125	R.G. Abbott		London		Public Hall, Canning Town	23 December 1937	
126	R.J. Reid		London		Public Hall, Canning Town	23 December 1937	
127	James R. Hughes	Furnaceman	Port Talbot		Port Talbot	7 February 1938	Rescued two colleagues from inside a gas-filled blast furnace.
128	Andrew Kiers						
129	Hayden Lippiat						
130	Lewis Morgan						
131	George Albert Deutz						
132	Elijah Bowers						
133	John Dixon						
134	John B. Ormiston						
135	Thomas G. Tatlock		Walkden		Walkden Town Hall	12 February 1940	
136	Jack Granwell		Walkden		Walkden Town Hall	12 February 1940	
137	Richard H. Potter						
138	John Gerald Fisher						
139	Alexander Noteman						
140	Stanley Hart Easter						
141	John Wainwright						
142	J. Johnston						
143	William Barrington	Postman					For rescuing children from a bomb-damaged house
144	John R. Nicholson	Seaman	Speke	20 September 1940			Dived fully clothed into Stalbridge Dock, to rescue a colleague. Also commended for a second rescue. Award presented by the Lord Mayor of Liverpool, Alderman Sir Sydney Jones.
145	Timothy O'Brien						Rescued men from the hold of a bombed ship in an unspecified Welsh port. Had also been a prisoner of war in World War I.
146	W.H. Rowberry						
147	Dr. John O'Hara						
148	William A. Wakeling				Channel Dry Docks, Cardiff	24 October 1941	
149	Charles Henry Barkley				Channel Dry Docks, Cardiff	24 October 1941	
150	John Harris						
151	Richard Johnson						
152	Richard J.V. Gray		Barking, London		Baths Hall, East Street, Barking	20 September 1932	
153	Frederick Winters		Ilford		Baths Hall, East Street, Barking	20 September 1932	
154	John Sinnott		Salford		Salford Central Mission	18 November 1943	
155	Charles Henry Sunley		Salford		Salford Central Mission	18 November 1943	
156	George H. Houghton						
157	James Sharman						
158	George Bradley	Ironstone miner					Known as "Abe"; also received the British Empire Medal.
159	Thomas Harold Barker	Collier		April 1943	NUM's Office, Barnsley	16 September 1944	
160	W. Rawson	Collier		April 1943	NUM's Office, Barnsley	16 September 1944	
161	J.A. Hall	Collier		April 1943	NUM's Office, Barnsley	16 September 1944	
162	J. Cruise	Collier		April 1943	NUM's Office, Barnsley	16 September 1944	
163	L. Thompson	Collier		April 1943	NUM's Office, Barnsley	16 September 1944	
164	Benjamin Gimbert	Train driver		2 June 1944	Hippodrome, March, Cambridgeshire	26 November 1944	Also received George Cross and LNER Silver medal for Courage and Resource. Medals now in the March & District Museum.
165	James W. Nightall	Railway fireman		2 June 1944	Hippodrome, March, Cambridgeshire	26 November 1944	Posthumous. Also received George Cross and LNER Silver medal for Courage and Resource
166	Richard V. Hawkes				Cross Keys Hotel, near Barnsley	11 August 1945	
167	Thomas Wood				Cross Keys Hotel, near Barnsley	11 August 1945	
168	Melville Hague				Cross Keys Hotel, nr. Barnsley	11 August 1945	
169	Arthur Hodson				Cross Keys Hotel, near Barnsley	11 August 1945	
170	John Leonard Timms						
171	Herbert Norman Stubbs	Railway fireman		22 March 1945			Also received the George Medal.
172	T.H. Stainton	Train driver					
173	William Hazon	Colliery under-manager	Birtley		Miner's Welfare Hall, Birtley	14 September 1946	
174	John William Ainsley	Collier	Birtley		Miner's Welfare Hall, Birtley	14 September 1946	
175	G.H. Dale		Middlesbrough		Union Council, Middlesbrough	14 December 1946	
176	G. Knight				Union Council, Middlesbrough	14 December 1946	
177	J. Easton				Union Council, Middlesbrough	14 December 1946	
178	T. Wheatman				Union Council, Middlesbrough	14 December 1946	
179	Wilfred Beasley			16 November 1946			"For his gallant attempts to save life... during a factory explosion in Widnes"
180	F.P. Agar		Langley Park		The King's Cinema, Langley Park	16 February 1947	Rescued a miner who had been overcome by gas, at Langley Park Mine.
181	T.W. Gardiner				The King's Cinema, Langley Park	16 February 1947	Rescued a miner who had been overcome by gas, at Langley Park Mine.
182	Arthur F. Couves						
183	Charles H. Fowler						
184	Charles Fairbrother		Mansfield	26 November 1947	Co-operative Hall, Nottingham	25 April 1948	
185	Horace R. Lievers		Mansfield	26 November 1947	Co-operative Hall, Nottingham	25 April 1948	
186	William Perkins						
187	Harold Childs	Nurse	Cane Hill Mental Hospital	June 1948	County Hall, Westminster	29 June 1948	Rescued a patient who had climbed up onto the sloped roof of his ward in the dark from a 40 ft 0 in (12.19 m) drop, a "calculated act of bravery". Medal presented by Mary Ormerod, chairman of the LCC Mental Hospitals Committee.
188	Henry Garnett	Nurse	Cane Hill Mental Hospital	June 1948	County Hall, Westminster	29 June 1948	Rescued a patient who had climbed up onto the sloped roof of his ward in the dark from a 40 ft 0 in (12.19 m) drop, a "calculated act of bravery". Medal presented by Mary Ormerod, chairman of the LCC Mental Hospitals Committee.
189	John Dexter						
190	John V. Harrild	Train driver (London tube)					Saved a child who was lying under the live rail in front of his train.
191	William James Carrick			17 April 1948		18 November 1948	"a brave man who in a moment of peril thought more of others than himself" Train crash on 17 April 1948, at Winsford in the London Midland Region (British Railways).
192	Harry E. Neave						
193	Sister Eileen M. S. Wiltshire	Nurse			Princess Hall, Workington	10 April 1949	One of two female recipients; for the "courageous rescue" of man after a furnace explosion.
194	James Wordsworth		Workington		Princess Hall, Workington	10 April 1949	
195	David Wallace		Workington		Princess Hall, Workington	10 April 1949	
196	Leonard Cross		Workington		Princess Hall, Workington	10 April 1949	
197	David Satorius						
198	Arthur Bobbett						Also awarded the Edward Medal. Died in a further incident before receiving his medals. OIH certifiicate and both medals now in the Abertillery and District Museum.
199	James Regan						
200	Robert Jefferson						
201	Frederick Pearce		Stockton		Jubilee Hall, Stockton on Tees	27 November 1949	Also received the George Medal.
202	Frank Simpson		Stockton		Jubilee Hall, Stockton on Tees	27 November 1949	Medal and certificate now in the Dorman Museum, Middlesbrough. Also received the George Medal.
203	Stanley E. Bell		Stockton		Jubilee Hall, Stockton on Tees	27 November 1949	Also received the George Medal.
204	Arthur W. Whatley		Newbridge		St. John Ambulance Hall, Newbridge	12 November 1949	
205	Ivor Rees		Newbridge		St. John Ambulance Hall, Newbridge	12 November 1949	
206	James Sinclair						
207	Harold J. Berwick	Railway guard	Bow		Paddington Town Hall	12 December 1949	Rescued a woman who had jumped onto the track, and tried to grab a live rail, at Ravenscourt Park tube station
208	William T. Chater		Acton		Paddington Town Hall	12 December 1949}	Rescued a woman who had jumped onto the track, and tried to grab a live rail, at Ravenscourt Park tube station
209	W. Sanderson						
210	Cecil Brazington		Lydbrook		Miner's Welfare Hall, Cinderford	28 April 1950	
211	Ronald Carter		Coleford		Miner's Welfare Hall, Cinderford	28 April 1950	
212	Albert Morgan		Lydbrook		Miner's Welfare Hall, Cinderford	28 April 1950	
213	Morgan Teague		Lydbrook		Miner's Welfare Hall, Cinderford	28 April 1950	
214	Henry Toomer		Ruardean		Miner's Welfare Hall, Cinderford	28 April 1950	
215	Leo Lewis Clarke	Stoker			Edmonton Town Hall	20 April 1950	Picked up and ran with a bomb that was about to explode, throwing it clear of his colleagues, and thereby sustaining injuries to his hand. Also received George Medal. Medals sold at Bonhams in October 2005.
216	Charles Corps						
217	John Collingwood						
218	Alfred Palmer						
219	Eric Vincent Liley	Quarryman	Scarborough		Roscoe Rooms, Scarborough	22 July 1950	Also awarded the George Medal. Also served with No. 3 Commando in World War II.
220	Donald Sutherland	Quarryman	Scarborough		Roscoe Rooms, Scarborough	22 July 1950	Also awarded the George Medal.
221	Arthur Darel Hughes						
222	Stephen Young						
223	Thomas Percy Davies						
224	Thomas Clark						
225	John Rees Williams						
226	George Henry Knapp						
227	James Lind						
228	Richard James Crooks						
229	Robert Brown		Preston		55th Division Club, Preston	1 May 1951	
230	Albert Cartmell		Preston		55th Division Club, Preston	1 May 1951	
231	Richard Bradshaw		Ashton-on-Ribble		55th Division Club, Preston	1 May 1951	
232	Sidney Craddock						
233	John Oake						
234	Cecil Victor Hollis						
235	Norman Warden Owen	Deep-sea diver					Cut off own finger to escape being trapped underwater. Had already been awarded the DSM during World War II.
236	Ernest W. Boxall						
237	John Prior						
238	Frederick Beckett	Collier	Trent Vale	14 September 1951	Council Chamber, Newcastle	24 January 1952	Underground rescue at Hem Heath Colliery
239	Thomas Degg	Collier	Stoke-on-Trent	14 September 1951	Council Chamber, Newcastle	24 January 1952	Undergrounde rescue at Hem Heath Colliery.
240	Jack Ledgar	Collier	Stoke-on-Trent	14 September 1951	Council Chamber, Newcastle	24 January 1952	Undergrounde rescue at Hem Heath Colliery.
241	Gilbert Beal						
242	Eric W. Gillett						
243	Sydney C. Tillman						
244	T.J. McDermott						
245	James French						
246	William Henry Wilkins						
247	Thomas W. Hiles						
248	Kenneth Roger Dancy	Chief Officer		10 January 1952			Dancy was Chief Officer of the RFA Turmoil, and was involved in attempts to prevent the SS Flying Enterprise, from sinking. Award presented by TUC Chairman Arthur Deakin, at a dinner hosted by the Navigator and Engineer Officers' Union.
249	Reginald V. Bowden						
250	Fred Nash						
251	John Wiliam Boyes		Guisborough		Corporation Hotel, Middlesbrough	16 October 1952	
252	Thomas Ward		Boosbeck		Corporation Hotel, Middlesbrough	16 October 1952	
253	Harry Passmore		Boosbeck		Corporation Hotel, Middlesbrough	16 October 1952	
254	Clarence Swainstone		Lingdale		Corporation Hotel, Middlesbrough	16 October 1952	
255	Raymond S. Tracey	Boat-builder					For a "man overboard" rescue in Stockholm.
256	Wilkinson Cook						
257	Michael J. Ryan						
258	William Dobb		Kirkby-in-Ashfield		Miner's Institute, Kirkby-in-Ashfield	28 March 1953	
259	Thomas H. Staples		Sutton-in-Ashfield		Miner's Institute, Kirkby-in-Ashfield	28 March 1953	
260	Richard Greensmith						
261	Richard Pocock		Bedminster		National Dock Labour Board, Sports Welfare and Social Club	10 April 1953	
262	Edward Ward		Bristol		National Dock Labour Board, Sports Welfare and Social Club	10 April 1953	
263	Lister Addy						
264	John Ayrey						
265	James Tatton	Collier					"...for the bravery he showed in the rescue of a fellow worker at Walsall Wood Colliery".
266	David Henry Thompson						
267	William Albert Warner	Boatswain	Parkeston, Essex		Dovercourt, Essex	23 October 1953	Rescued three people from his ship, TSS Duke of York, after a collision at sea.
268	Thomas Walker						
269	Lawrence Lester						
270	Silas J. Bray					1953	For "preventing a serious collision at Bradford Goods Depot on 26 January 1953". Certificate now in the Science Museum, London.
271	Harley Dickson						
272	James Walsh	Collier	Arley, Warwickshire				"At grave risk to his life, he struggled through a narrow tunnel to rescue another miner, Delwyn Hughes, who had been trapped for nine hours by a landslip in the mine."
273	James Ernest Hawes						
274	Terrance Fagan						
275	Arthur Grady						
276	Ernest Lomas		Bothel		Social Centre, Aspatria	21 May 1954	
277	James L. Storey		Gilcrux		Social Centre, Aspatria	21 May 1954	
278	Albert S. Damerel	Farm Worker			Hydro Hotel, Paignton	10 April 1954	Bravery in rescuing a comrade when the petrol tank of a baler engine exploded on a local farm
279	Arthur Vaughan		Hartshorne		Town Hall, Swadlincote	24 March 1954	
280	Frank Vaughan		Midway		Town Hall, Swadlincote	24 March 1954	
281	George Hillary		Aspatria		Social Centre, Aspatria	21 May 1954	
282	Ronald Trevor House						
283	John Hughes						
284	George T. Jennings						
285	Richard Price		Footscray, Kent		Greenwich Town Hall	27 October 1954	
286	Albert Boswell		Charlton, S.E.7		Greenwich Town Hall	27 October 1954	
287	Henry Cripps		St. Paul's Cray, Kent		Greenwich Town Hall	27 October 1954	
288	Rolyat Smith		Ecclesfield		Barnsley Town Hall	27 November 1954	
289	Nicholas Scallan		Rotherham		Barnsley Town Hall	27 November 1954	
290	Robert Malone		Sheffield		Barnsley Town Hall	27 November 1954	
291	Ernest Gee						
292	Richard Thomas Morris						
293	Charles William Jack		Thornton Heath		Cafe Royal, North End, Croydon	23 March 1955	
294	Edward John Best		Croydon		Cafe Royal, North End, Croydon	23 March 1955	
295	John Henry Williams						
296	George Gargett		Rossington		Miner's Offices, Barnsley	12 September 1955	
297	George Spencer		Rossington		Miner's Offices, Barnsley	12 September 1955	
298	Percy Sharland	Farmworker	Woodbury	27 December 1954	Hydro Hotel, Paignton	7 May 1955	"Messrs Sharland and Buckley, farmworkers of Woodbury and Lympstone, near Exmouth in Devon received the award for saving each other from an attack by a rogue bull at Webbers Farm, Woodbury on Boxing Day 1954"
299	Nigel Buckley	Farmworker	Lympstone	27 December 1954	Hydro Hotel, Paignton	7 May 1955	"Messrs Sharland and Buckley, farmworkers of Woodbury and Lympstone, near Exmouth in Devon received the award for saving each other from an attack by a rogue bull at Webbers Farm, Woodbury on Boxing Day 1954"
300	Philip Heron						
301	Frederick Henderson	Dock Worker	Rotherhithe, London	5 January 1955	Assembly Hall, Rotherhithe	10 June 1955	"Diving into the Grand Surrey Canal and saving a fellow registered worker (Mr. G. Collie) from drowning"
302	Dennis F. Kinchin						
303	Alfred Bergman						
304	Peter Newland						
305	Anthony James Arthur Rivers	Railway lampman	Netherton	7 October 1954		30 June 1955	Saved a woman whose foot was caught in a level crossing at Cradley Heath station, sustaining a fractured pelvis in doing so. Also received the George Medal.
306	Thomas John Storey						
307	Stanley Brotton						
308	Allan Leslie Pampling						
309	Mark Overson						
310	John McLaughlin						
311	James Murphy						
312	John Douglas Evans						
313	Manvers Main Lodge	Union Lodge					
314	Charles Edward Booles						
315	Albert E. Passam	Collier					"shielded a trapped miner with his body, and in the process got buried himself".
316	Albert George Marsh	Fireman GWR					
317	William White						
318	Arthur Bird	Driver	Keighley	23 February 1956	Co-operative Hall, Keighley		Rescued three women firm a fire at Eastwood Mills, Keighley
319	John Henry Moffatt						
320	John M. Whitington						
321	John Alfred Hughes						
322	James Farrell		Felling		County Hotel, Newcastle	21 June 1956	
323	Herbert Austin Heddle		South Shields		County Hotel, Newcastle	21 June 1956	
324	Richard Raylton Joicey		Ponteland		County Hotel, Newcastle	21 June 1956	
325	John Frederic Weike	Senior Ordinary Seaman	East Ham, London	April 1956	Merchant Navy Hotel, London	25 September 1956	Attempted to rescue a shipmate ("Maltese Joe") from shark-infested waters after diving 30 feet from the M.V. Imperial Star off Cape Town. Also awarded the Queen's Commendation for Brave Conduct.
326	Robert Graham		London, E.16		Stratford Town Hall	7 December 1956	
327	John Creasey		Barking		Stratford Town Hall	7 December 1956	
328	Douglas Hunter						
329	Frederick J. Waye						
330	William Henry Browes		Scunthorpe		Queensway Hotel, Scunthorpe	6 February 1957	
331	Clifford Heseltine		Scunthorpe		Queensway Hotel, Scunthorpe	6 February 1957	
332	John E.N. Davies						
333	George A. Schofield				Walsall Wood Colliery Canteen	4 February 1957	
334	George Bywater				Walsall Wood Colliery Canteen	4 February 1957	
335	Malcolm MacIntyre		Portnahaven, Islay		Merchant Navy Hotel, London	24 October 1958	
336	Kallia Banna		Shetland Islands		Presented privately at NUS office in Glasgow		
337	Daniel McNeill						
338	Eric Longden						
339	Dennis Hennessey						
340	John Axon	Train driver					Posthumous. Also received George Cross. Certificate now in the Science Museum, London.
341	Frank Milburn		Houghton-le-Spring		Lambton Miner's Hall, Fence Houses	21 September 1957	
342	Roland Todd		Houghton-le-Spring		Lambton Miner's Hall, Fence Houses	21 September 1957	
343	Robert William Ashton		near Blackpool		North Euston Hotel, Fleetwood	11 October 1957	
344	Ernest Leadbetter		Fleetwood		North Euston Hotel, Fleetwood	11 October 1957	
345	Arthur Wilton		New Cross		Small Library Hall, Bermondsey	29 November 1957	
346	Anthony John Bulman		London, S.E.4		Small Library Hall, Bermondsey	29 November 1957	
347	Philip Richards		Drayton		Berkshire County Conf. Reading	23 November 1957	
348	Eric B. Webb		Drayton		Berkshire County Conf. Reading	23 November 1957	
349	James Gilmore						
350	Joseph Anthony Healey		West Hampstead		Finsbury Town Hall	12 February 1958	
351	Stanly Osborn Stone		Peckham		Finsbury Town Hall	12 February 1958	
352	Thomas Davis		Coalpit Heath		Portcullis Hotel, Chipping Sodbury	22 February 1952	
353	Reginald Haycock		Warmley		Portcullis Hotel, Chipping Sodbury	22 February 1952	
354	John Sullivan						
355	William Jack Read	Collier	Pontypool		Elm House, Pontypool	24 May 1958	
356	J. Arthur Jones	Collier	Pontypool		Elm House, Pontypool	24 May 1958	Medal now in the National Museum Wales.
357	Ivor Price						
358	Frederick J. Scales	Lift boy (seaman)	London, E.16	6 May 1958	Merchant Navy Hotel, London	11 July 1958	Saved a drowning "man overboard" at Wellington, New Zealand.
359	Leslie Charie	Bell boy (seaman)	Birmingham	6 May 1958	Merchant Navy Hotel, London	11 July 1958	Saved a drowning "man overboard" at Wellington, New Zealand.
360	Desmond John Stokes						
361	Frederick Marchant						
362	Thomas Ashby	Railwayman (station foreman)	East Croydon	4 July 1958	S.R.A. Club Hall, East Croydon station	7 October 1958	Rescued a man who had fallen onto the running line at East Croydon station, adjacent to a live rail, and in front of an oncoming train.
363	Michael Cannon						
364	Derek Shallcross		Wallasey		Lancaster Gate	2 January 1959	
365	Ronald Wilson		Edinburgh		Lancaster Gate	2 January 1959	
366	Frederick John Fice						
367	Frank J. Smith						
368	Thomas Sellers						
369	John Connolly						
370	Percy Thomas Bendle						
371	Kenneth Barnicoat						
372	Alexander McLean		Stockton-on-Tees		Merchant Navy Hotel, London	16 February 1959	
373	Brian Greenwood		South Shields		Merchant Navy Hotel, London	16 February 1959	
374	Kenneth Davies						
375	Guy Parker						
376	Charles E. Hayward						
377	Michael Dennis				Merchant Navy Hotel, London	22 July 1959	
378	Henry Dillon				Merchant Navy Hotel, London	22 July 1959	
379	John McIntee			25 April 1959			Posthumous.
380	Ernest McConnell						
381	John Albert Norton						
382	Donouvan Brightman						
383	Terence G. O'Connor						
384	Donald Campbell						
385	Alfred Benson						
386	Horace W. Haigh						
387	Iorrie Jones						
388	Lawrence Larkin						
389	Peter Parkinson	Collier					"...for stopping a manriding train which had run away on a steep incline at Dawdon Colliery".
390	Arthur George Fooks						
391	Richard H. Sinclair						
392	John Ernest Simmons						
393	Robert McLean						
394	Norman Drayton						
395	Thomas Rumble						
396	John James Underhill						For "bravery following a fire incident at Richmond gas works". Also given the British Empire Medal.
397	George Barnett						
398	John Reeves						
399	Alan Brown						
400	Hickleton Main Colliery	Union Lodge					
401	George Walker	Lorry driver					
402	George Fawcett						
403	George Leeson						
404	William J. Mitchell						
405	William Douglas						
406	Victor G. Worth						
407	Malcolm F. Eyre						
408	Brian Dugdale						
409	Thomas W. Atkin						
410	Raymond Eric Seaton						
411	Ruth Stanaway	Potato picker		November 1961	Gainsborough	May 1962	The only solo female recipient; for giving prompt first aid to a burns victim.
412	Ivor Davies						
413	Leo Clitheroe						
414	George Robson		Sunderland		Roker Hotel, Sunderland	3 November 1962	
415	George Fowler		Sunderland		Roker Hotel, Sunderland	3 November 1962	
416	Harry Piper						
417	Kenneth Tinkler		Great Clifton, Workington		Westfield Centre, Workington	13 October 1962	
418	William Currie		Workington		Westfield Centre, Workington	13 October 1962	
419	Herbert Briggs		Workington		Westfield Centre, Workington	13 October 1962	
420	Bulah Carter						
421	Dennis O'Neill						
422	William Thompson		Bishop Auckland		T. Bainbridge Hall, Newcastle	13 October 1962	
423	Maurice Wall		Bishop Auckland		T. Bainbridge Hall, Newcastle	13 October 1962	
424	John MacIver		Isle of Lewis		Southampton Office, N.U.S.	21 January 1963	
425	Tom D. Archibald		Southampton		Southampton Office, N.U.S.	21 January 1963	
426	Stuart Percy Ransom						
427	Anthony C. G. Symes						
428	Thomas Price Davies						
429	William Kay						
430	Nigel Juggins						
431	Dennis Savage						
432	Thomas F. Briggs						
433	John Rae						
434	Henry Arthur Dixon						
435	Raymond Holt						
436	Harold Shaw						
437	Gordon Scovell		Sholing, Southampton		The Top Hat Ballroom, Southampton	8 May 1964	
438	Mark Dickson		Southampton		The Top Hat Ballroom, Southampton	8 May 1964	
439	David Charles Ross						
440	Ronald G. Hall						
