= Littleport =

Town in Cambridgeshire, England

Coordinates: 52.4568°N 0.3046°E

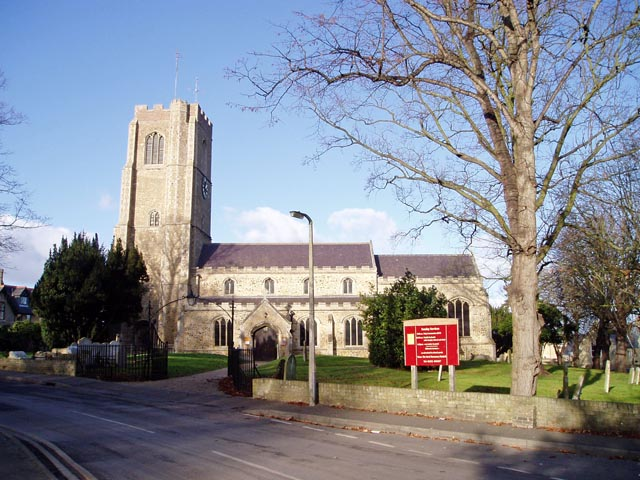
- St George's Church

- Location within Cambridgeshire
- Area: 2.417 km^{2} (0.933 sq mi)
- Population: 9,168 (2021)
  - Density: 3,793/km^{2} (9,820/sq mi)
- OS grid reference: TL568868
  - London: 67.4 mi (108.5 km) S
- District: East Cambridgeshire
- Shire county: Cambridgeshire
- Region: East
- Country: England
- Sovereign state: United Kingdom
- Post town: ELY
- Postcode district: CB6
- Dialling code: 01353
- Police: Cambridgeshire
- Fire: Cambridgeshire
- Ambulance: East of England
- UK Parliament: Ely and East Cambridgeshire

Littleport is a town in East Cambridgeshire, in the Isle of Ely, Cambridgeshire, England. It lies about 6 miles (10 km) north-east of Ely and 6 miles (10 km) south-east of Welney, on the Bedford Level South section of the River Great Ouse, close to Burnt Fen and Mare Fen. It is served by Littleport railway station. There are two primary schools, Millfield Primary and Littleport Community, and a secondary, Vista Academy. The Littleport riots of 1816 influenced the passage of the Vagrancy Act 1824.

== History ==
With an Old English name of Litelport, the village was worth 17,000 eels a year to the Abbots of Ely in 1086.

The legendary founder of Littleport was King Canute. A fisherman gave the king shelter one night, after drunken monks had denied him hospitality. After punishing the monks, he made his host the mayor of a newly founded village.

The Littleport Riots of 1816 broke out after war veterans from the Battle of Waterloo returned home, only to find they could get no work and grain prices had gone up. They took to the streets and smashed shops and buildings until troops were brought in. St George's church registers were destroyed in the riots. The remaining registers start from 1754 (marriages), 1756 (burials), and 1783 (baptisms). Some original documents to do with the riots are held in Cambridgeshire Archives and Local Studies at the County Record Office, Cambridge.

In 1944, the Boat Race was held on the River Great Ouse between Littleport and Queen Adelaide, Cambridgeshire. The Boat Race 2021 was also held here because of the COVID-19 pandemic and safety issues with Hammersmith Bridge on the Thames.

In 2003, a Harley-Davidson statue was unveiled in Littleport to mark the centenary of the motorcycle company. William Harley, father of the company's co-founder William Sylvester Harley, was born in Victoria Street, Littleport, in 1835 and emigrated to the United States in 1859.

=== World War II ===
On 16 December 1944, British double agent Eddie Chapman was flown on a mission to Britain by the Germans in a fast and manoeuvrable small fighter plane, that took off from a forward Luftwaffe fighter station on the Dutch coast. The purpose of the mission was to monitor the accuracy of V-1 flying bombs and V-2 rockets falling on London and then to report back their effect on the morale of the population in order to improve the performance and devastation of the attacks. After following the bombs to London, Chapman's fighter rerouted to East Anglia to enable him to bail out over flat ground.

The fighter had been converted for parachuting by cutting a small trap door in the floor. The low-flying fighter was picked up by a British night-fighter and attacked over the dropping zone. Chapman scrambled head first through the trap door, with his parachute initially getting stuck. Whilst floating down to the ground he witnessed the British night-fighter re-engage the German fighter, which burst into flames and exploded in a fireball as it hit the ground killing the remaining crew. Chapman landed near Apes Hall, Littleport, in the middle of the night. He woke the farm foreman George Convine by banging on the hall door. To avoid difficult questions, Corvine was told by Chapman that he was a crashed British airman and that he needed him to call the police.

== Governance ==
Littleport is a civil parish with an elected town council. Town council meetings are held in the Barn.

The second tier of local government in Littleport was Ely Rural District from 1894 to 1974, when East Cambridgeshire District Council was formed based in Ely. The third tier is Cambridgeshire County Council.

The parish belongs to the parliamentary constituency of Ely and East Cambridgeshire.

== Economy ==
Thomas Peacock, who founded the gentlemen's tailoring chain Hope Brothers, was born in Littleport in 1829. Peacock had several shops in London starting from one in Ludgate Hill. The first three-storey Hope Brothers shirt and collar-making factory was opened in the village in 1881 in White Hart Lane. By 1891 it was employing 300–400 women and children. It had a social club and library. For a period in the 1940s and 1950s, Hope Brothers also manufactured the England football kit. The factory was later taken over by Burberry.

From 1979 to 1983, the firm of Jim Burns guitars was based in Padnal Road in Littleport. It produced guitars such as the Steer, popularized by Billy Bragg.

== Little Ouse ==
Littleport parish includes the hamlet of Little Ouse which comes under the Littleport East ward. Little Ouse is now wholly residential: the pub (Waterman's Arms) and the Church of St John the Evangelist have become private dwellings.

The lowest trig point in Britain is near Little Ouse; it sits at 3 ft (0.91 m) below sea level.

== Climate ==
Cambridgeshire's average annual rainfall of 24 inches (600 mm) makes it one of Britain's driest counties. Protected from the cool onshore coastal breezes east of the region, the county is warm in summer and cold and frosty in winter.

The nearest Met Office weather station is Cambridge NIAB.

Several other local weather stations report periodic figures to the internet. For example, via Weather Underground, Inc.

Climate data for Cambridge (1971–2000 averages)
Month	Jan	Feb	Mar	Apr	May	Jun	Jul	Aug	Sep	Oct	Nov	Dec	Year
Mean daily maximum °C (°F)	7.0 (44.6)	7.4 (45.3)	10.2 (50.4)	12.6 (54.7)	16.5 (61.7)	19.4 (66.9)	22.2 (72.0)	22.3 (72.1)	18.9 (66.0)	14.6 (58.3)	9.9 (49.8)	7.8 (46.0)	14.1 (57.4)
Mean daily minimum °C (°F)	1.3 (34.3)	1.1 (34.0)	2.9 (37.2)	4.0 (39.2)	6.7 (44.1)	9.8 (49.6)	12.0 (53.6)	11.9 (53.4)	10.1 (50.2)	7.1 (44.8)	3.7 (38.7)	2.3 (36.1)	6.1 (43.0)
Average rainfall mm (inches)	45.0 (1.77)	32.7 (1.29)	41.5 (1.63)	43.1 (1.70)	44.5 (1.75)	53.8 (2.12)	38.2 (1.50)	48.8 (1.92)	51.0 (2.01)	53.8 (2.12)	51.1 (2.01)	50.0 (1.97)	553.5 (21.79)
Source: Met Office

== Demography ==
Littleport is 28.46 square miles (73.7 km^{2}) in size, making it the largest village in East Cambridgeshire by area. The city of Ely itself has the highest East Cambridgeshire population with Soham second and Littleport third.

Historical population of Littleport
Census	Population	Source
1801	1,602	
1811	1,847	
1821	2,364	
1831	2,644	
1841	3,365	
1851	3,832	
1861	3,733	
1871	3,903	
1881	3,571	
1891	4,201	
1901	4,221	
1911	4,527	
1921	4,526	
1931	4,779	
1941	No census	
1951	5,182	
1961	5,291	
1971	5,293	
1981	5,673	
1991	6,282	
2001	7,521	
2011	8,738	

== Notable people ==
- Peter Ackroyd (1917–2005), Biblical scholar, died in a nursing home here.
- William Harley emigrated to the United States, where his son William Sylvester Harley went into partnership to establish the Harley-Davidson Motorcycle Company
- Fred Hockley (1923–1945), World War II fighter pilot
- Edward Mortimer-Rose (1920–1943), World War II fighter pilot
- James Nightall (1922–1944), posthumously awarded the George Cross for gallantry shown in the Soham rail disaster in 1944
- Marty Scurll, professional wrestler. BOLA 2016 winner and multiple times Progress Wrestling Champion
- Victor Watson (born 1936), children's writer and academic, born in Littleport
- Thomas Peacock (born 1829 in Littleport, died 1895) set up the gentlemen's tailoring chain Hope Brothers and built a shirt and collar factory in Littleport in 1881.
- Roger Law (born 1941 in Littleport), is a British caricaturist, ceramist and one half of Luck and Flaw, creators of the popular satirical TV puppet show Spitting Image.

== Local folklore and legends ==
=== Black dog hauntings ===
Littleport is home to two different legends of spectral black dogs, which have been linked to the Black Shuck folklore of the East of England but differ in significant aspects.

The local folklorist W. H. Barrett tells a story set before the English Reformation, of a local girl gathering wild mint from a nearby mere, who is rescued from a lustful friar by a huge black dog, both of which are killed in the struggle. The local men throw the body of the friar into the mere, but bury with honour the dog, which is then said to haunt the area.

Cambridgeshire folklorist Enid Porter tells stories from the 19th century of a black dog haunting the A10 road between Littleport and the neighbouring hamlet of Brandon Creek. Local residents are kept awake on dark nights by the sounds of howling and travellers hear trotting feet behind them and feel hot breath on the back of their legs. Local legend says that the dog is awaiting the return of its owner, who drowned in the nearby River Great Ouse in the early 1800s. This haunting reportedly ended in 1906, when a local resident drove his car into something solid, which was never found, next to the spot where the dog's owner supposedly drowned.

=== Cultural reference ===
Littleport provided the inspiration for Great Deeping, the imaginary location of the Paradise Barn children's novels by Victor Watson, set in the Second World War.

== Gallery ==
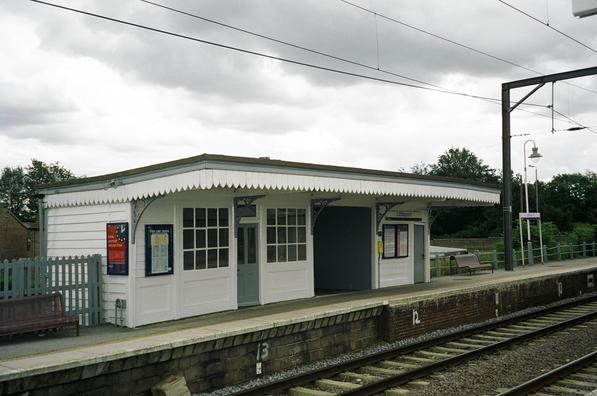
Littleport railway station

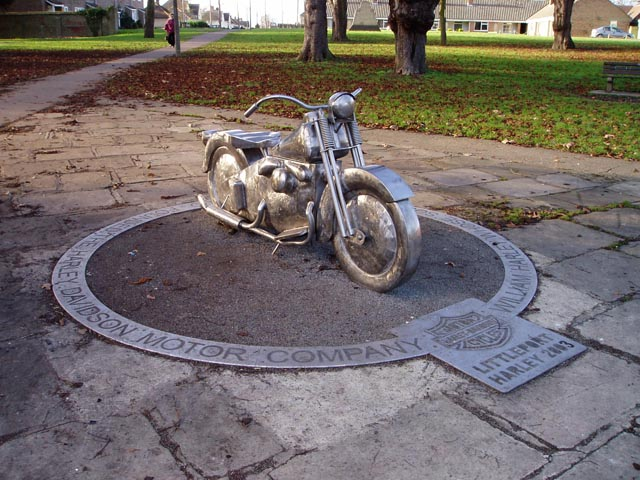
Harley-Davidson monument
