= Gimbert =

Gimbert is a surname. Notable people with the surname include:

- Ben Gimbert (1903–1976), English engine driver
- Ghislain Gimbert (born 1985), French footballer
- Philippe Gimbert (born 1966), French rugby union player
- Sébastien Gimbert (born 1977), French motorcycle racer
- Vanesa Gimbert (born 1980), Spanish footballer
