= Soham railway station =

Railway station in Cambridgeshire, England

Soham
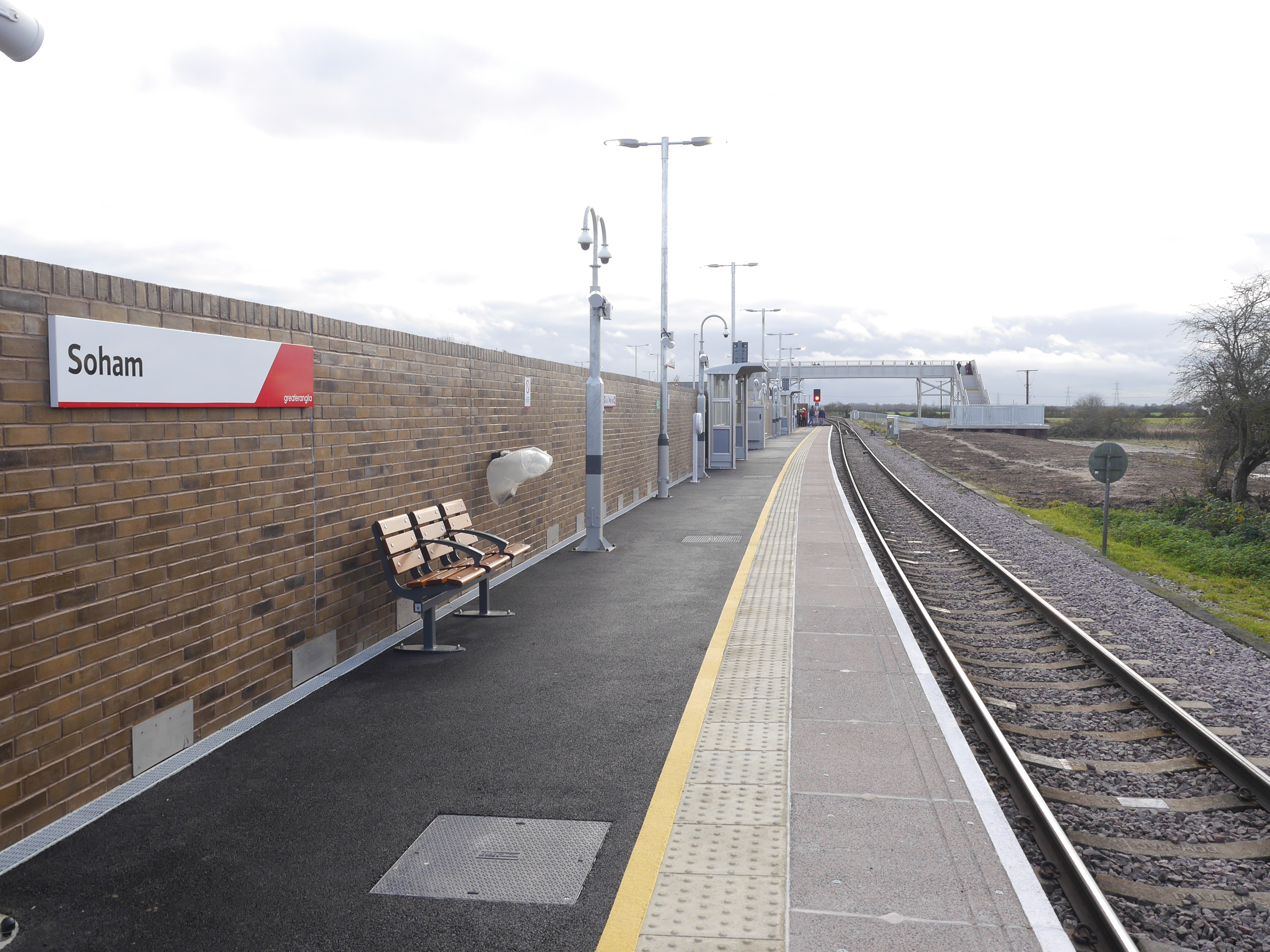
- The platform at Soham railway station in December 2021

General information
- Location: Soham, East Cambridgeshire; England
- Coordinates: 52.33415°N 0.32770°E
- Grid reference: TL587732
- Owner: Network Rail
- Manager: Greater Anglia
- Platforms: 1

Other information
- Station code: SOJ

History
- Original company: Ely and Newmarket Railway
- Pre-grouping: Great Eastern Railway
- Post-grouping: London and North Eastern Railway

Key dates
- 1 September 1879: Opened
- 13 September 1965: Closed
- 13 December 2021: Re-opened

Passengers
- 2021/22: 14,196
- 2022/23: ▲55,518
- 2023/24: ▲65,912
- 2024/25: ▼65,796
- 2025/26: ▼61,782
Location
Notes
- Passenger statistics from the Office of Rail and Road

Soham railway station is a station on the Ipswich–Ely line, serving the town of Soham in Cambridgeshire. The original station operated between 1879 and 1965. It was reopened in 2021.

== History ==
Soham station originally opened on 1 September 1879.

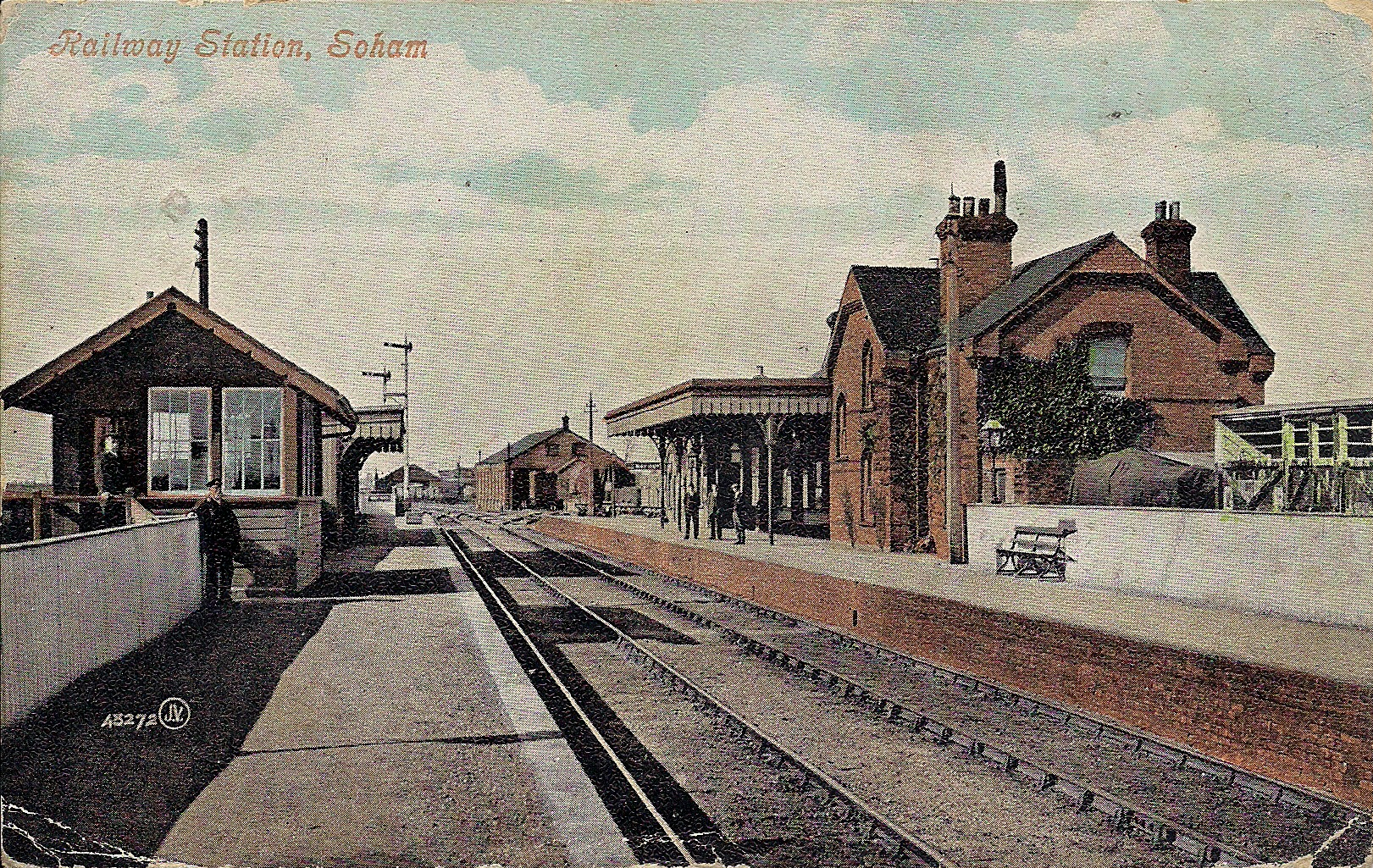
The original station and buildings in 1912

On 2 June 1944, the station was destroyed in the Soham rail disaster, when a munitions train carrying high explosive bombs caught fire and blew up, killing two and damaging over seven hundred buildings. The driver, Benjamin Gimbert, and fireman, James Nightall, were both awarded the George Cross for preventing further damage which would have occurred if the rest of the train had exploded. The signal box, also damaged in the explosion which resulted in the death of signalman Frank Bridges, is now preserved on the Mid-Norfolk Railway.

The station was closed to passengers on 13 September 1965, but the line remained open both as a passenger route and for a heavy service of freight trains running principally between Felixstowe Docks and the Midlands.

Following many years of local campaigning, a new station was opened, on the same site, on 13 December 2021, with services operated by Greater Anglia.

=== Reopening ===
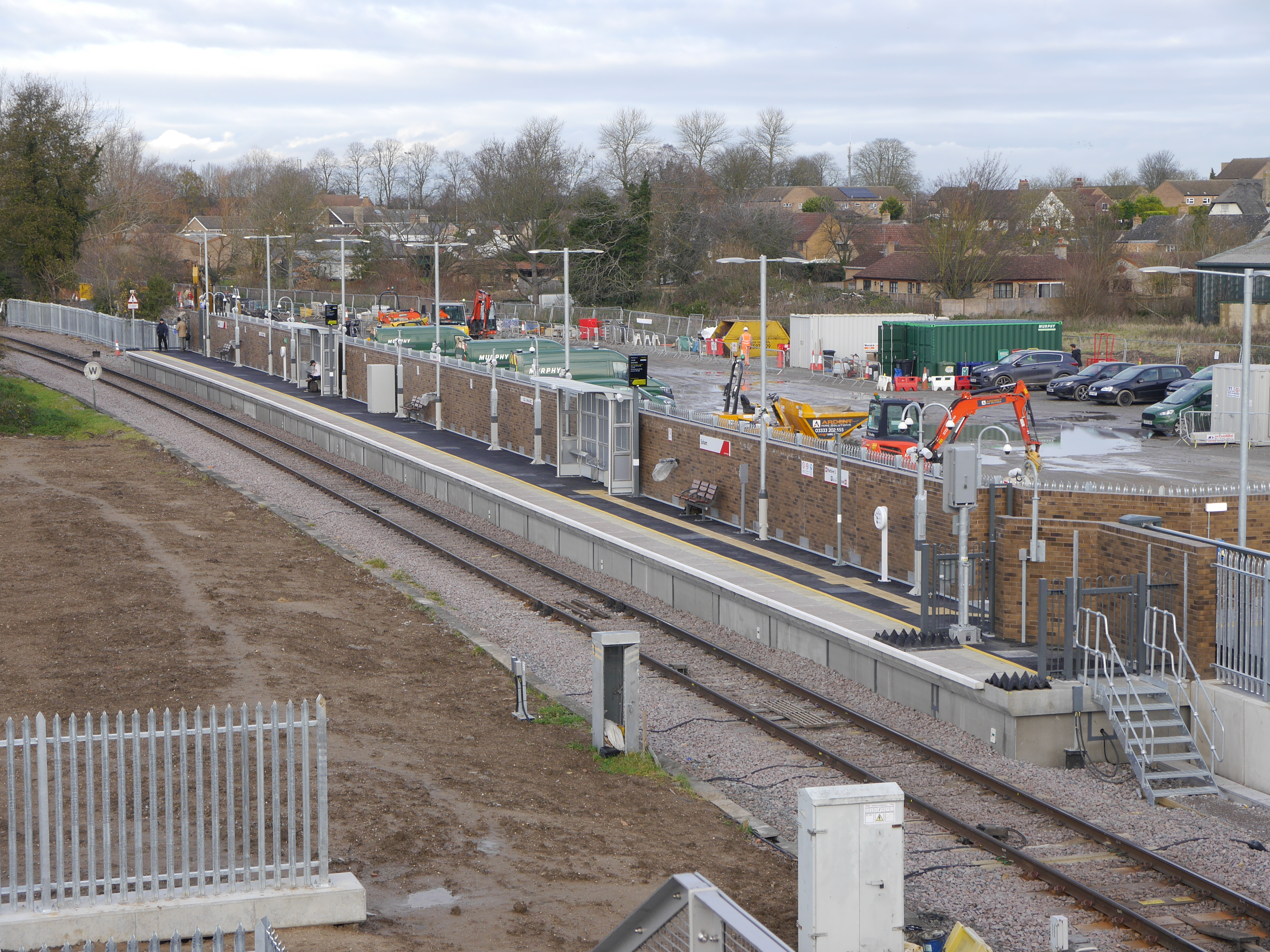
Overall view of the new station on 13 December 2021.

Since closure a local campaign had run to reopen the station. In February 2011 East Cambridgeshire District Council obtained funding for a study into a possible reopening. In January 2013 Network Rail released a five-year upgrade plan, which included reopening Soham station as part of improvements to the Ipswich to Ely Line.

A Network Rail study concluded that building a new station on the existing infrastructure was feasible and that the current line could support an additional stop at Soham. Although Soham was unsuccessful in a bid submitted to the New Stations Fund second round, funding was obtained from the Cambridgeshire and Peterborough Combined Authority (CPCA) and Cambridgeshire County Council to progress the next stage of design work with Network Rail.

Enabling works for the new station by Network Rail started in autumn 2020, and main construction started in March 2021. The station was opened on 13 December 2021.

There are no current plans for direct services to Cambridge, but the CPCA has expressed support for the idea in a future phase of the project. Mayor James Palmer said "the delivery of Soham station gives us a much stronger case to go to Government and Network Rail and lobby for the reinstating of the Snailwell loop which will provide a direct service between Ely, Soham, Newmarket and Cambridge". Improvements to Ely North Junction as a result of monies from the cancelling of part of HS2 in October 2023 further improve this case.

== Facilities ==
The station has a single 100-metre (330 ft) platform capable of accommodating a four-car train. A stepped footbridge spans across the railway to an existing right of way – as well as being future proofed for a potential second platform and lifts. The station also has a drop off and pick up point, cycle parking and a 50 space car park.

== Services ==
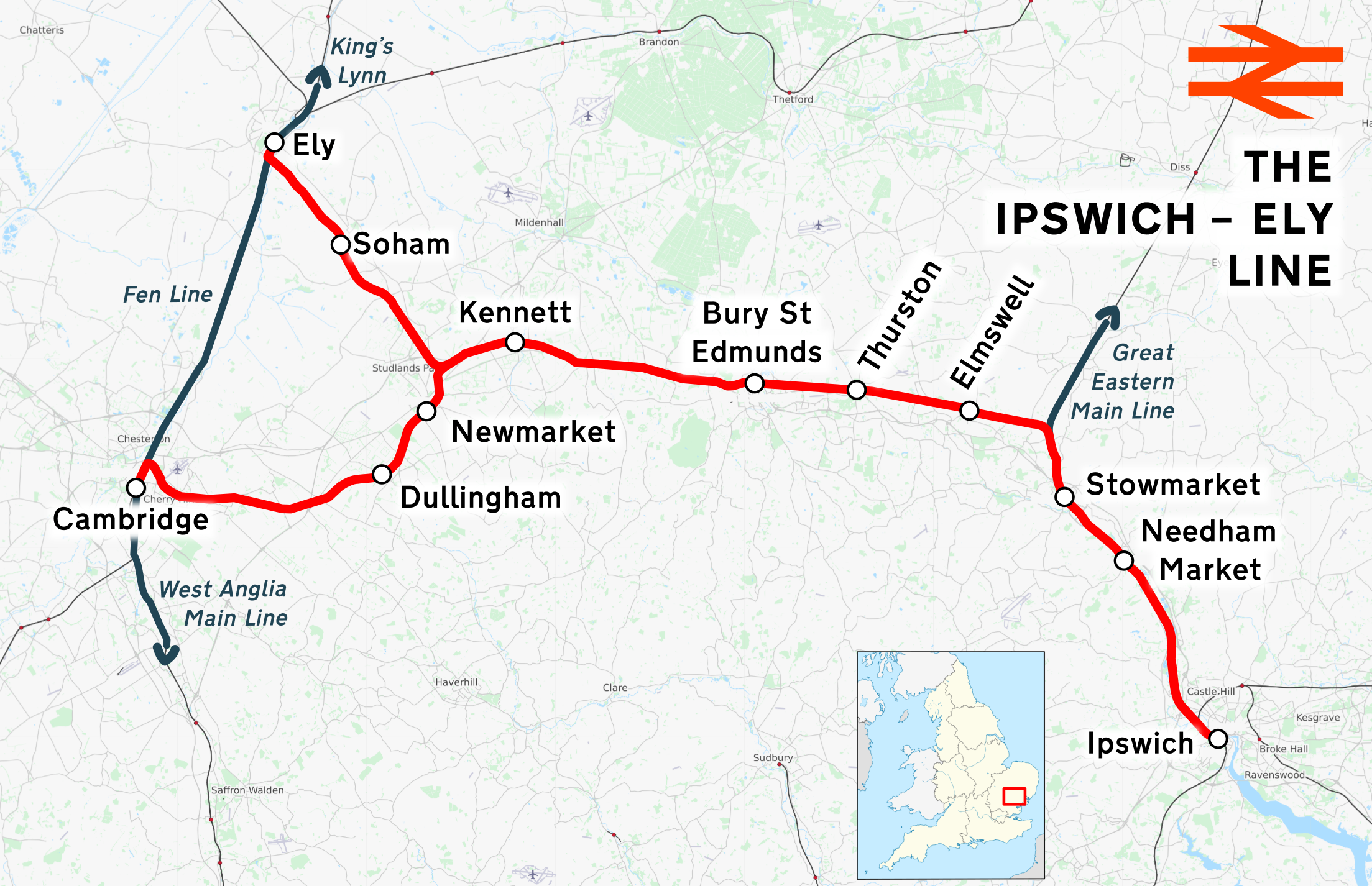
location of Soham station on the Ipswich to Ely line

The typical off-peak service frequency is one train every two hours in each direction between Peterborough and Ipswich via Bury St Edmunds. All services are operated by Greater Anglia using Class 755 bi-mode trains.

Preceding station	National Rail	Following station
Ely	Greater Anglia Ipswich to Ely Line	Bury St Edmunds
Ely	Greater Anglia Ipswich to Ely Line	Kennett Limited service
	Historical railways	
Ely Line and station open	Great Eastern Railway Ely and Newmarket Railway	Fordham Line open, station closed
