= Soham Abbey =

Coordinates: 52.3335°N 0.3369°E

Soham Abbey was an Anglo-Saxon monastery in Soham, which at the time was in the Kingdom of East Anglia. Constructed by St Felix of Burgundy during the early part of the 7th century, it was the first Roman Christian site to be established in Cambridgeshire.

== History ==
Soham Abbey was founded around 630 by Felix of Burgundy, the first bishop of East Anglia as part of a campaign to embed Christianity in East Anglia. After his death in 647, his remains were moved from his episcopal see at Dommoc to the chancel of the minster church at Soham to preserve them from desecration by Danish raiders.

The Danes attacked East Anglia in 869. The abbey was destroyed the following year and was never rebuilt. Æthelric (bishop of Dorchester) later removed Felix's remains to Ramsey Abbey.

In 1189, Richard I gave the parish church to the Cistercian Abbey of Le Pin (Vienne), whose abbot was his almoner. In 1285 Le Pin rented the Soham estate including the patronage of the vicarage, to its fellow-Cistercian Abbey of Rewley.

== Abbey church ==
It is believed that the church was of a squat, low design with a long north transept, and four or five bays long with a round tower standing nearby. St. Felix was originally buried here.

Soham's current church (dedicated to St Andrew not to Felix) is believed to have been built on the same site as the abbey, although the structure dates from Norman times: the earliest part is the crossing (which cannot be seen from the outside) dating from the twelfth century.

== Description ==
This evidence is taken from a later woodcut that shows the abbey surrounded by monastic buildings and with a wall and moat around the complex. The moat can be traced today in a circle starting at the new vicarage and following Station Road, Gardiners Lane, Clay Street, Brook Dam Lane and Paddock Street, then back to the vicarage.
