= Kidsgrove Town Hall =

Municipal building in Kidsgrove, Staffordshire, England

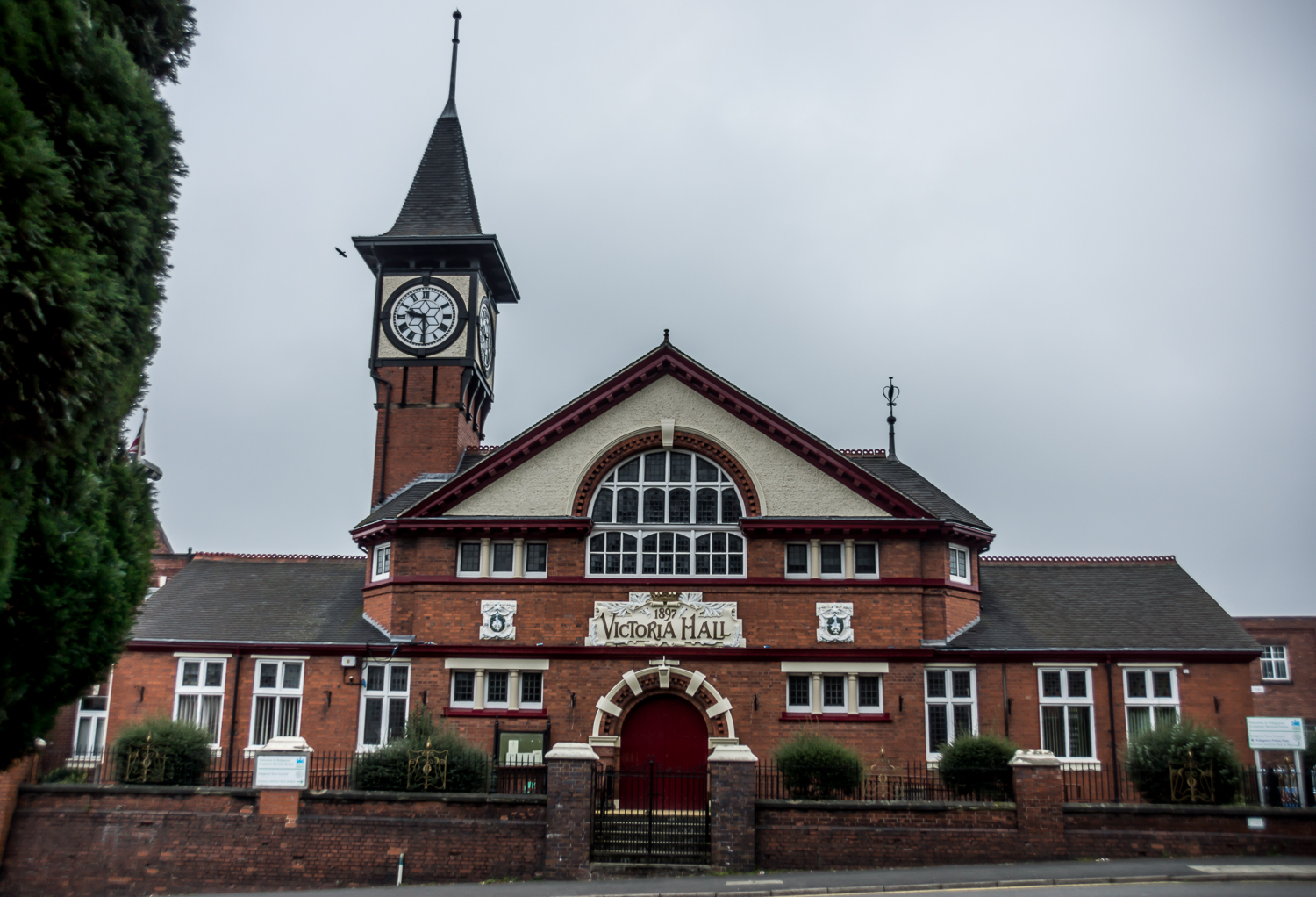
- Kidsgrove Town Hall

- Shown in Staffordshire
- 53.0863°N 2.2387°W
- Location: Liverpool Road, Kidsgrove

History
- Built: 1898

Site notes
- Architect(s): Wood and Hutchings
- Architectural style: Victorian style

Kidsgrove Town Hall is a municipal building in Liverpool Road in Kidsgrove, Staffordshire, England. The building, which is the meeting place of Kidsgrove Town Council, is locally listed.

== History ==
Following significant population growth, largely associated with the mining industry, the area became an urban district in 1894. The newly-formed Kidsgrove Urban District Council decided to commission public offices as part of the celebrations for the Diamond Jubilee of Queen Victoria in 1897. The site was donated by the local member of parliament, James Heath, and his family and foundation stones were laid by Heath and a former chairman of the council, John Smith, on 22 April 1897. The new building was designed by Absalom Reade Wood from the local firm of architects, Wood and Hutchings, in the Victorian style, built in red brick with stone dressings at a cost of £2,250 and was completed in 1898.

The design involved a symmetrical main frontage with nine bays facing onto Liverpool Road; the central section of three bays, which slightly projected forward, featured a segmental doorway with an architrave and five keystones surmounted by an ornate panel bearing a crown, the year, 1897, and the inscription "Victoria Hall". There was a Diocletian window on the first floor and both the doorway and the Diocletian window were flanked by tripartite windows with the parts separated by small Doric order columns. The section was surmounted by an open modillioned pediment and flanked by three-bay single-storey wings fenestrated by casement windows. Behind and to the left of the central section was a clock tower with a pyramid-shaped roof, containing a clock by Smiths of Derby. Internally, the principal room was the main hall, which was named the "Victoria Hall" and equipped with a balcony; there was also a library, a reading room and a mortuary. The architectural historian, Nikolaus Pevsner, liked the design and called it "quite a progressive building".

The town hall was the venue for a ceremony at which two local colliery workers, Paling Baker and Harry Wilson, were presented with the Order of Industrial Heroism for lifesaving at Harriseahead Colliery, in February 1925. The structure was extended to the north west to create additional offices for the council in 1934, and the leader of the Labour Party and future Prime Minister, Clement Attlee, visited the town hall in 1937. The building continued to serve as the headquarters of the urban district council for much of the 20th century, but ceased to be local seat of government when the enlarged Newcastle-under-Lyme Borough Council was formed in 1974. The building instead became the meeting place of Kidsgrove Town Council. In 1976, Donald Neilson, who had been accused of the kidnapping and murder of Lesley Whittle, was committed for trial in the town hall.

An extensive programme of refurbishment works, which included the replacement of the clock faces and the roof, was carried out to a design by Tarpey Woodfine and was completed in 2007. In March 2012, in accordance with commitments previously made to the town council, Newcastle-under-Lyme Borough Council offered to rationalise ownership of the building with the Victoria Hall being assigned to the town council and the rest of the town hall complex being retained by Newcastle-under-Lyme Borough Council: the change in ownership was formally registered with HM Land Registry in April 2017.
