= Cambridgeshire Archives and Local Studies =

Cambridgeshire Archives and Local Studies Service (CALS) is a UK local government institution which collects and preserves archives, other historical documents and printed material relating to the modern county of Cambridgeshire, which includes the former counties of Huntingdonshire and the Isle of Ely. CALS is part of Cambridgeshire County Council.

CALS runs two record offices, one at Ely and the other at Huntingdon. Both record offices are recognised by The National Archives as places of deposit for public records, and by the Church of England as repositories for ecclesiastical records.

In addition, CALS also runs three local studies libraries, at Cambridge, Huntingdon and Wisbech, to hold printed and published material.

In 2019 the Cambridge archive was moved from its original home in the basement of Shire Hall in Cambridge to the site of a former bowling alley at The Dock in Ely.

== Holdings ==
Archival holdings held by CALS of national and international significance include:

- some original historical documents of Lord Protector Oliver Cromwell, Richard Cromwell and their families, seventeenth century
- photographs of members of the USAAF based in Cambridgeshire during World War II
- records of the Bedford Level Corporation which drained the Fens in East Anglia
- the library of the UK Cromwell Association
- records of Cambridgeshire and Huntingdonshire families involved in slavery and abolitionism, including lists of individual slaves and plans of a slave hospital in the West Indies dating from 1791
- some records relating to Olaudah Equiano, an eighteenth-century merchant and freed former slave in the American colonies and in Britain, who was a leading influence in the abolition of slavery and who was married at Soham, Cambridgeshire
- historical records of Papworth Hospital and tuberculosis settlement, twentieth century.

== Barcoding project ==
In 2006 CALS began a major project to re-box and barcode all of its archival holdings, in preparation to move them to new premises. All of the holdings at Huntingdon were barcoded, repackaged where necessary and then moved to the new Huntingdon Library and Archives Building in June 2009. Barcoding and repackaging work is now underway at Cambridge.
