= Frederick Marchant =

American Photographer

Frederick "Frank" Marchant (ca. 1872 – February 6, 1942) was an American photographer. Born in Pennsylvania, he moved to Hamlet, North Carolina to work as an engineer for the Seaboard Air Line Railroad railway before opening a photography studio in 1907. Most of his work consisted of outdoor scenes in Hamlet and the nearby city of Rockingham, selling his work on postcards. He also worked for several years as an official photographer for Seaboard and captured numerous images of trains and train wrecks. Marchant's career declined in the late 1920s and early 1930s due to his alcoholism and the Great Depression. The remaining negatives in his possession were destroyed after his death in 1942, though some of his images were preserved by the State Archives of North Carolina and in private collections.

== Early life ==
Frederick Marchant was born in Pennsylvania in about 1872. He was one of three children of William J. and Henrietta (Hattie) S. Makeley Marchant. He was educated in civil engineering in Philadelphia. After 1900, he moved to the railway town of Hamlet, North Carolina and worked for the Seaboard Air Line Railroad as a civil engineer.

== Photography ==
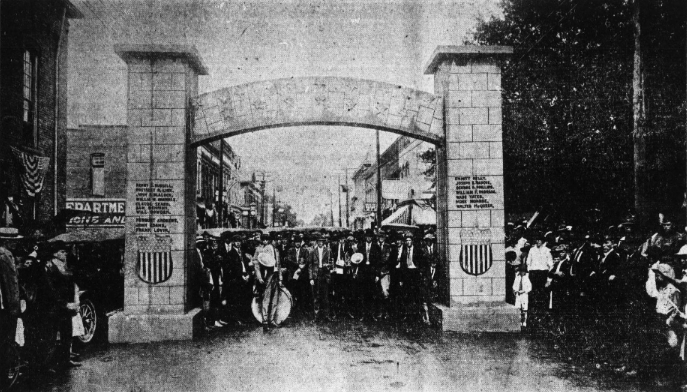
Photo by Marchant of World War I veterans' parade in Rockingham, 1919. Reproductions of this photo were advertised by the Rockingham Post-Dispatch at $1.00 per copy.

In 1907 Marchant opened a photography studio in a rented room above a grocery store in Hamlet. He worked for several years as Seaboard's official photographer. Marchant took most of his photos outdoors in Hamlet and the nearby city of Rockingham. Few of his photos were done in his studio. He would occasionally travel further to Anson, Scotland, Robeson, and Union counties for work. Most of his work focused on trains and train wrecks, parades, hotels, people (black and white), town life, cotton fields, and snow scenes. His railway photography stretched geographically as far was as Rutherford County and as far east as Wilmington. He also documented the construction of Blewett Falls Dam and the trial of gangster Lewis West in 1911 in Wilson County.

Marchant sold his work as postcards at hotels, drugstores, and railway depots. Hamlet hosted numerous railway travelers, many of whom purchased these cards as souvenirs. In 1911 he submitted some of his photos for copyright protection. Marchant's career declined in the late 1920s and early 1930s due to his alcoholism and the Great Depression. He stopped actively photographing but continued to develop film, and may have sold some of his negatives for money. By 1935, he could no longer afford the state license fee for developing film. Due to his reclusive life and his northern accent, many Hamlet residents regarded him as a "town curiosity". There are no known photos of him, but Richmond County residents described him as about five feet and eleven inches tall, about 180 pounds in weight, and often sporting a beard.

== Later life ==
Marchant became a heavier drinker after his mother—who was living with him—died in 1922. By the end of his life he had been reduced to poverty and was living in a tin-roofed shack. He died of kidney disease at Hamlet Hospital on February 6, 1942 and was buried at Mary Love Cemetery. Since he had no wife or other known kin, Hamlet officials disposed of his belongings, including his remaining negatives. Most of his work has been lost. Some of his postcards and a few dozen of his negatives were later acquired by the State Archives of North Carolina. Other examples of his work were saved in private archives and libraries.

== Works cited ==
- Massengill, Stephen E.; Vallance, C. Vernon (2005). Richmond County and the Seaboard Air Line Railway. Arcadia Publishing. ISBN 9780738517544.
