= Soham rail disaster =

Ammunition train exploded, 1944

Coordinates: 52°20′06″N 0°19′41″E

Details
- Date: 2 June 1944
- Location: Soham, Cambridgeshire
- Country: England
- Line: Ely and Newmarket Railway
- Cause: Ammunition Explosion

Statistics
- Trains: 1
- Deaths: 2

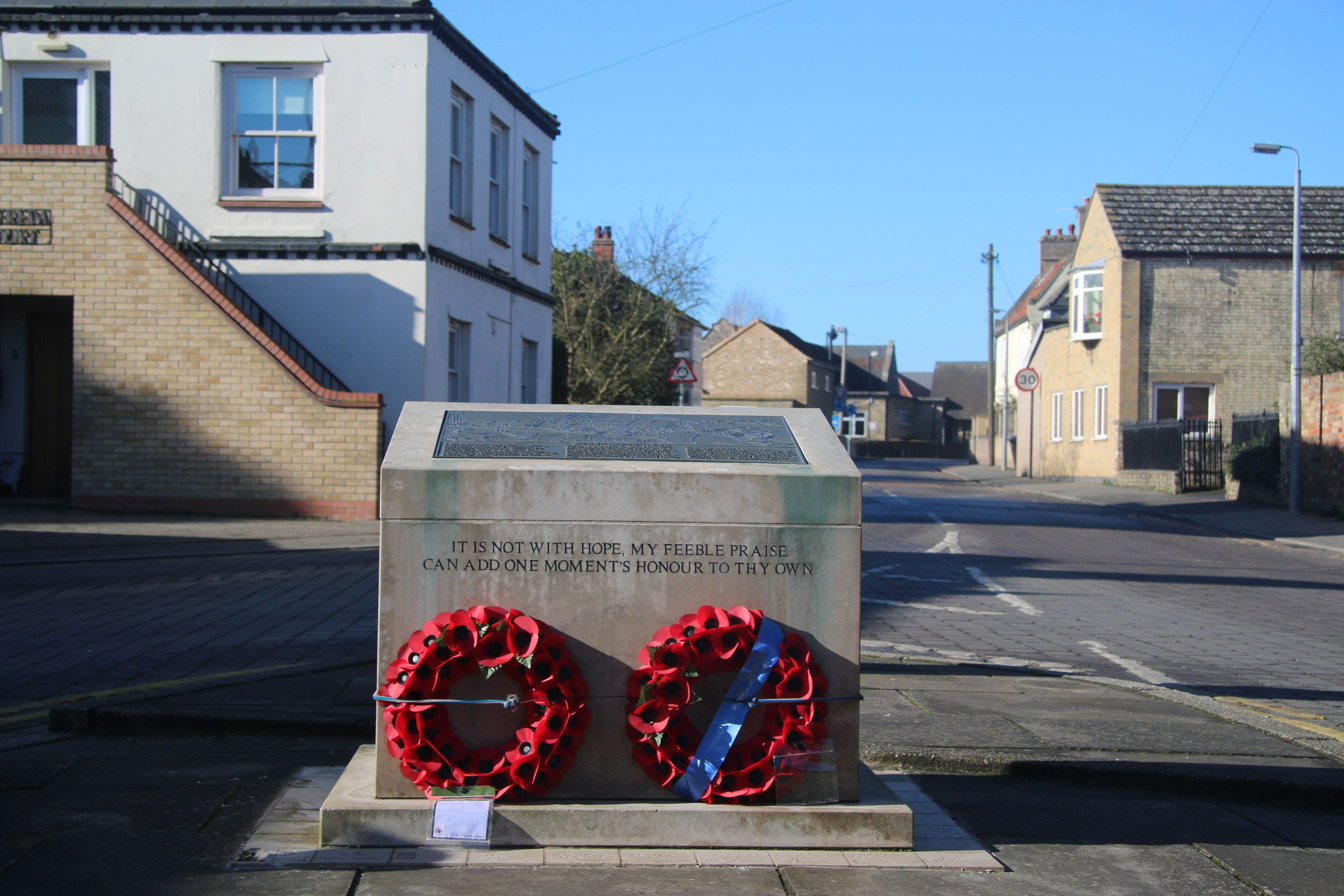
The memorial to the victims of the 1944 rail disaster

The Soham rail disaster occurred on 2 June 1944, during the Second World War, when a fire developed on the leading wagon of a heavy ammunition train. The wagon contained a quantity of high explosive bombs. The train crew had detached the wagon from the rest of the train and were drawing it away when the cargo exploded. The fireman of the train and the signalman at Soham signalbox were killed and several other people injured. The driver, Benjamin Gimbert, and fireman, James Nightall, were both awarded the George Cross for preventing further damage which would have occurred if the rest of the train had exploded.

== Details ==
At 12.15 a.m. on 2 June 1944 a heavy freight train left Whitemoor marshalling yard, near March (in the Isle of Ely, now in Cambridgeshire). The train comprised WD Austerity 2-8-0 engine No. 7337, 51 wagons and brake van heading for Ipswich. The cargo on the train consisted of 44 wagons containing a total weight of 400 tons of bombs and a further seven wagons containing other components e.g. tail fins. On board the engine were 41-year-old driver Benjamin Gimbert and 22-year-old fireman James Nightall; the train guard was Herbert Clarke.

About 90 minutes later the train was approaching Soham station when the driver looked back to see flames coming from the leading wagon which contained 44 general purpose 500 pounds (227 kg) bombs – a total weight of 9 long tons 16 cwt (22,000 lb or 10 t). Gimbert brought the train to a stop and, rather than running for safety, instructed Nightall to uncouple the first wagon from the rest of the train. Nightall managed this quickly although the fire was now quite serious. Gimbert started to draw the wagon away and had moved it about 140 yards (128 m) and was still alongside the platforms at Soham station when the bombs went off. A much more severe explosion was averted by the men's actions.

The resulting blast killed Nightall immediately. Signalman Frank Bridges, who was on the opposite platform watching the burning train pass, died the next day. Gimbert, though badly injured, survived. Guard Clarke, although stunned by the blast and suffering from shock, managed to walk to the next signal box to warn the signalman there what had happened. Apart from these four men, five others suffered severe injuries and another 22 minor injuries. The explosion created a crater 66 feet (20.1 m) in diameter and 15 feet (4.6 m) deep, the station buildings were almost demolished and there was damage severe or moderate to over 700 properties within 900 yards (823 m).

Despite the severity of the explosion, emergency repairs meant that the line was open to freight traffic within eighteen hours and passenger traffic resumed the next day.

Locomotive 7337 was extensively damaged by the explosion but was repaired and returned to service. It later served on the Longmoor Military Railway in Hampshire as No. 400 Sir Guy Williams, and was scrapped in 1967.

== Cause ==
The cause of the fire was never fully explained. The wagon had previously been used to carry a load of bulk sulphur powder and although it had been cleaned in between loads, the inspector concluded that small quantities of the powder still remained in the wagon.

Although all wagons in the consist were sheeted, three of them (including the leading wagon that caught fire) were found, rather than having their sheeting hanging over the sides, to be tucked inside around the bombs, which could have allowed sparks from the engine to drop into the wagon, igniting the residual sulphur inside which being under the sheet, accumulated heat until it burst into flame rather than smoulder.

== Aftermath ==
Although this was still a sizeable explosion, the effect and damage was little compared to what would have happened if the entire train load of bombs had exploded. The conduct of the driver and fireman in reducing the result of the incident was recognised by the award in July 1944 of the George Cross to both men. The citation for the awards read;

As an ammunition train was pulling into a station in Cambridgeshire, the driver, Gimbert, discovered that the wagon next to the engine was on fire. He immediately drew Nightall's attention to the fire and brought the train to a standstill. By the time the train had stopped the whole of the truck was enveloped in flames and, realising the danger, the driver instructed the fireman to try to uncouple the truck immediately behind the blazing vehicle. Without the slightest hesitation Nightall, although he knew that the truck contained explosives, uncoupled the vehicle and rejoined his driver on the footplate.

The blazing van was close to the station buildings and was obviously liable to endanger life in the village. The driver and fireman realised that it was essential to separate the truck from the remainder of the train and run it into the open. Driver Gimbert set the engine in motion and as he approached a signal box he warned the signalman to stop any trains which were likely to be involved and indicated what he intended to do. Almost immediately the vehicle blew up. Nightall was killed and Gimbert was very severely injured.

Gimbert and Nightall were fully aware of the contents of the wagon which was on fire and displayed outstanding courage and resource in endeavouring to isolate it. When they discovered that the wagon was on fire they could easily have left the train and sought shelter, but realising that if they did not remove the burning vehicle the whole of the train, which consisted of 51 wagons of explosives, would have blown up, they risked their lives in order to minimise the effect of the fire. There is no doubt that if the whole train had been involved, as it would have been but for the gallant action of the men concerned, there would have been serious loss of life and property.

== Memorial ==
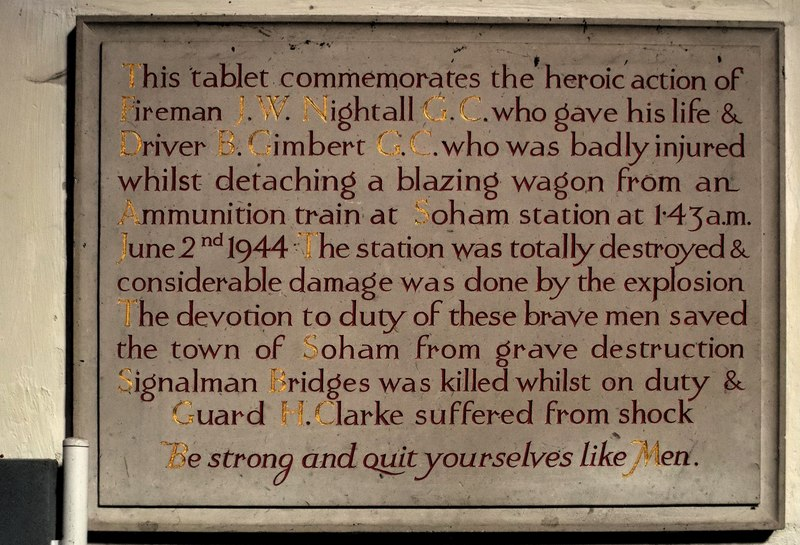
Memorial tablet in St Andrew's Church, Soham. The Bible verse at the base is from 1 Samuel 4:9 in the King James Version.

A permanent memorial was unveiled on 2 June 2007 by Prince Richard, Duke of Gloucester followed by a service in St Andrew's Church, Soham. The memorial is constructed of Portland stone with a bronze inlay depicting interpretive artwork of the damaged train as well as text detailing the incident.

Both Gimbert and Nightall had Class 47 locomotives named after them, although the nameplates have since been transferred to Class 66 locomotives. However, 47579 also retains its name in preservation.

Soham station was closed to passengers in 1965. After over 50 years it was reopened in December 2021. A plaque in memory of the four railwaymen involved was unveiled at the reopening.
