= James Nightall =

Engine fireman involved in the Soham rail disaster

James William Nightall
- Born: 20 May 1922; Littleport, Isle of Ely, England
- Died: 2 June 1944 (aged 22); Soham, England
- Occupation: Fireman with the London & North Eastern Railway
- Known for: Hero of Soham rail disaster
- Awards: George Cross; Order of Industrial Heroism

Railwayman James William Nightall GC (20 May 1922 – 2 June 1944) was posthumously awarded the George Cross and the Order of Industrial Heroism for the gallantry he showed during the Soham rail disaster. Nightall was a London & North Eastern Railway (LNER) fireman on a 51-wagon ammunition train driven by Benjamin Gimbert. When a wagon caught fire, Nightall helped Gimbert uncouple it from the rest of the train in order to allow Gimbert to tow the burning wagon away from the rest of the ammunition wagons on the train. The wagon exploded after being towed a distance of 140 yards (130 m), killing Nightall instantly, but preventing a chain reaction in the other wagons. The explosion blew a twenty-foot crater in the track, destroyed Soham railway station, and damaged 600 buildings in the village. Gimbert, who survived the conflagration, was also awarded the George Cross and Order of Industrial Heroism.

== Early life ==
Nightall was born in Littleport Isle of Ely (now Cambridgeshire), England, on 20 May 1922. He was the son of Walter Nightall, a labourer, and Alice Nightall.

He had a fiancée when he died, Edna Belson.

== Awards ==
The citation for the award of the George Cross read:

As an ammunition train was pulling into a station in Cambridgeshire, the driver, Gimbert, discovered that the wagon next to the engine was on fire. He immediately drew Nightall's attention to the fire and brought the train to a standstill. By the time the train had stopped the whole of the truck was enveloped in flames and, realizing the danger, the driver instructed the fireman to try to uncouple the truck immediately behind the blazing vehicle. Without the slightest hesitation Nightall, although he knew that the truck contained explosives, uncoupled the vehicle and rejoined his driver on the footplate.

The blazing van was close to the station buildings and was obviously liable to endanger life in the village. The driver and fireman realized that it was essential to separate the truck from the remainder of the train and run it into the open. Driver Gimbert set the engine in motion and as he approached a signal box he warned the signalman to stop any trains which were likely to be involved and indicated what he intended to do. Almost immediately the vehicle blew up. Nightall was killed and Gimbert was very severely injured.

Gimbert and Nightall were fully aware of the contents of the wagon which was on fire and displayed outstanding courage and resource in endeavouring to isolate it. When they discovered that the wagon was on fire they could easily have left the train and sought shelter, but realizing that if they did not remove the burning vehicle the whole of the train, which consisted of 51 wagons of explosives, would have blown up, they risked their lives in order to minimize the effect of the fire. There is no doubt that if the whole train had been involved, as it would have been but for the gallant action of the men concerned, there would have been serious loss of life and property.

Nightall was also awarded the Order of Industrial Heroism and the LNER gallantry medal.

== Memorials ==
On 28 September 1981 two Class 47 locomotives were named in honour of the two railwaymen: No. 47577 was named "Benjamin Gimbert, GC" and No. 47579 "James Nightall, GC". The nameplate "James Nightall G.C" was removed in November 1995. The loco was preserved in March 2007 and is at Mangapps Railway Museum (as at Oct 2015). On 2 June 2004, new "James Nightall G.C" nameplates were applied to 66 079 at Whitemoor yard (March).
