= Order of Industrial Heroism =

Former private civil award given in the United Kingdom

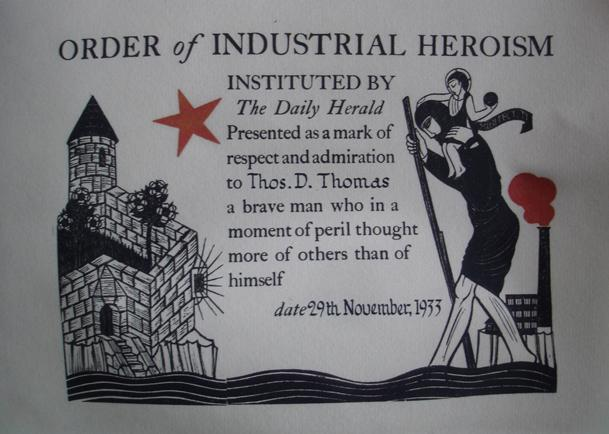
'Order of Industrial Heroism' certificate awarded to Thomas "Derwydd" Thomas in 1933. Features a 1923 woodcut design by Eric Gill.

The Order of Industrial Heroism was a private civil award given in the United Kingdom by the Daily Herald newspaper to honour examples of heroism carried out by ordinary workers. Many of the 440 awards were posthumous. Only two were made to a woman; six were awarded to large groups of miners, under the auspices of their trade union lodges.

The medal of the Order was designed by sculptor Eric Gill and issued in bronze with a burgundy ribbon. The medal bears the image of Saint Christopher bearing the Christ Child.

== History ==
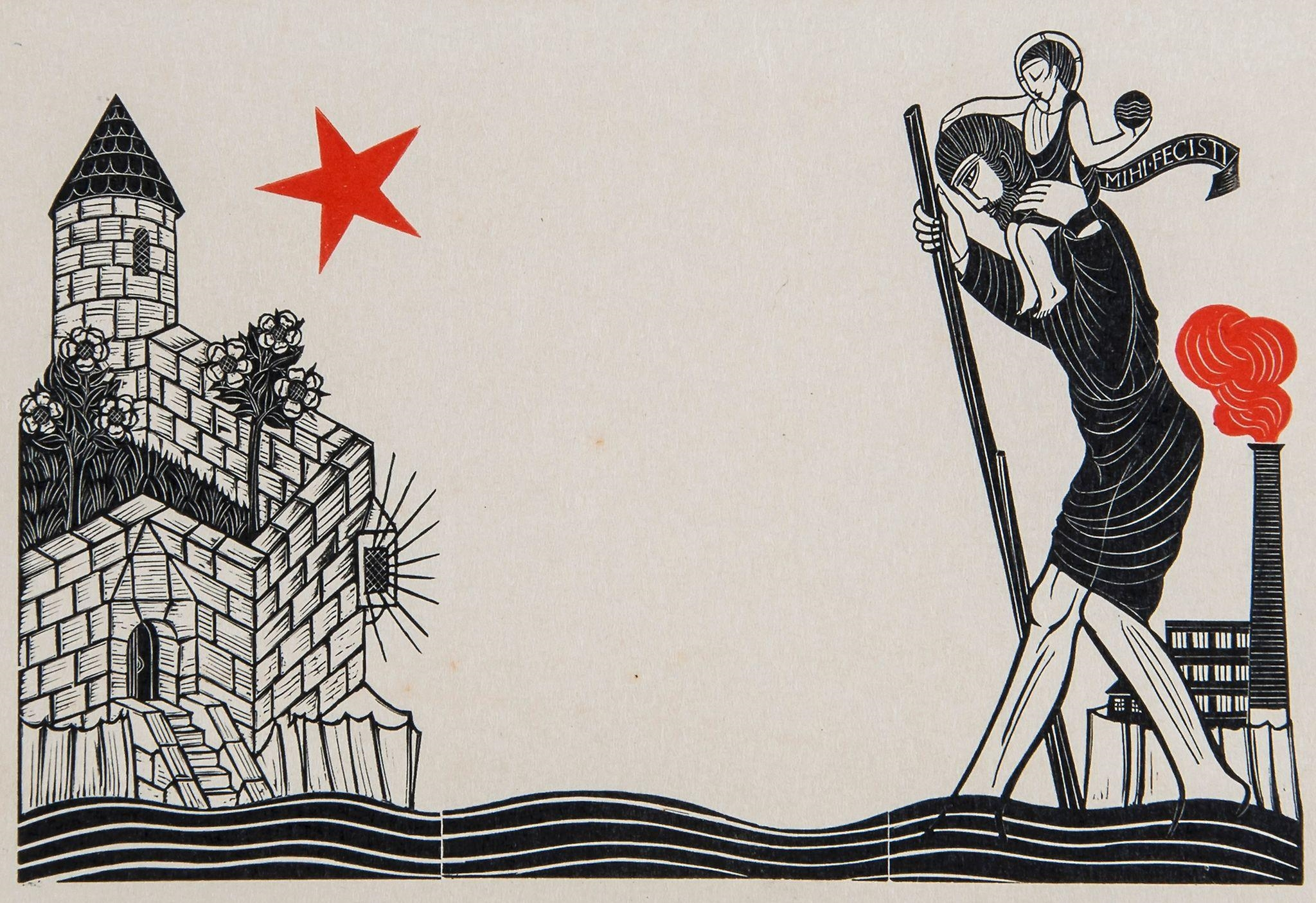
Eric Gill's design as used on the 'Order Of Industrial Heroism' certificate, with a red star, 1923

The Order was instituted in 1923 by the Daily Herald specifically to recognise the deeds of valour of those who had saved their fellow workers from danger or death. It was popularly known as the "Workers' VC".

The institution of the medal was prompted by an incident in which four dockworkers helped control a major fire in the Liverpool docks, thereby saving the docks, shipping and a large part of the city, but were offered a reward of only £17 shared between all four, provoking a public outrage.

Recipients were also given a monetary prize and an Eric Gill designed certificate, depicting Saint Christopher, in front of a smoking chimney, carrying the Christ Child across water, towards a walled garden ("A Rose Plant in Jericho") with a red star overhead, Certificates for individual men were inscribed:

Presented as a mark of respect and admiration to [name] a brave man who in a moment of peril thought more of others than of himself

Later certificates used a variation on Gill's design.

The Daily Herald was the official organ of the Trades Union Congress and one of the world's best-selling newspapers at the time.

The award was presented 440 times up to 1964, when the newspaper closed. Sometimes there were multiple awards relating to one event; six of the awards were to miners' union lodges, rather than individuals, where a large number of members had been involved in mine rescues. Only one of the solo awardees, Ruth Stanaway, was a woman; another, Sister Eileen M. S. Wiltshire, received one alongside three men.

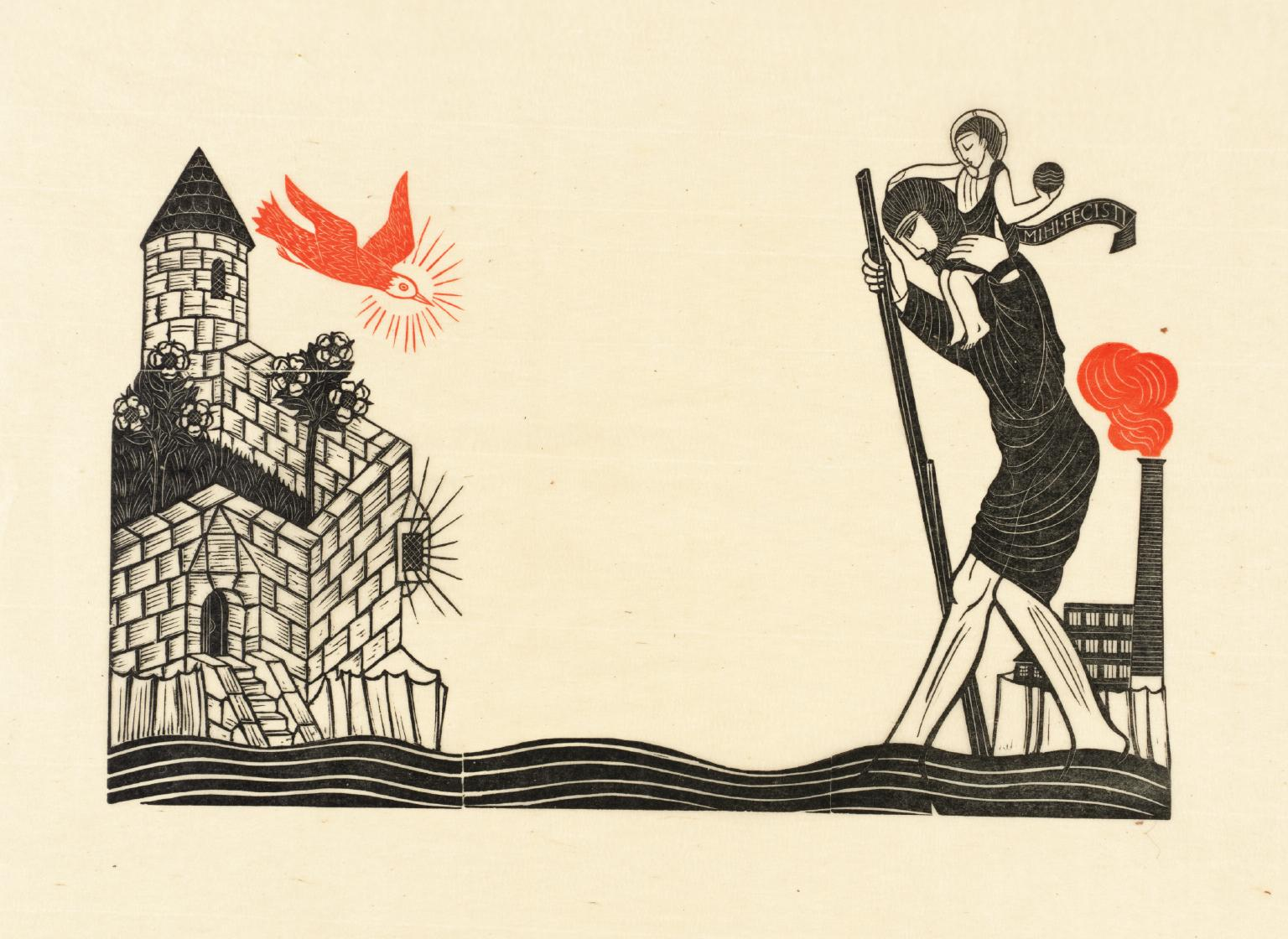
Eric Gill's original design for the 'Order Of Industrial Heroism' certificate, with dove, 1923

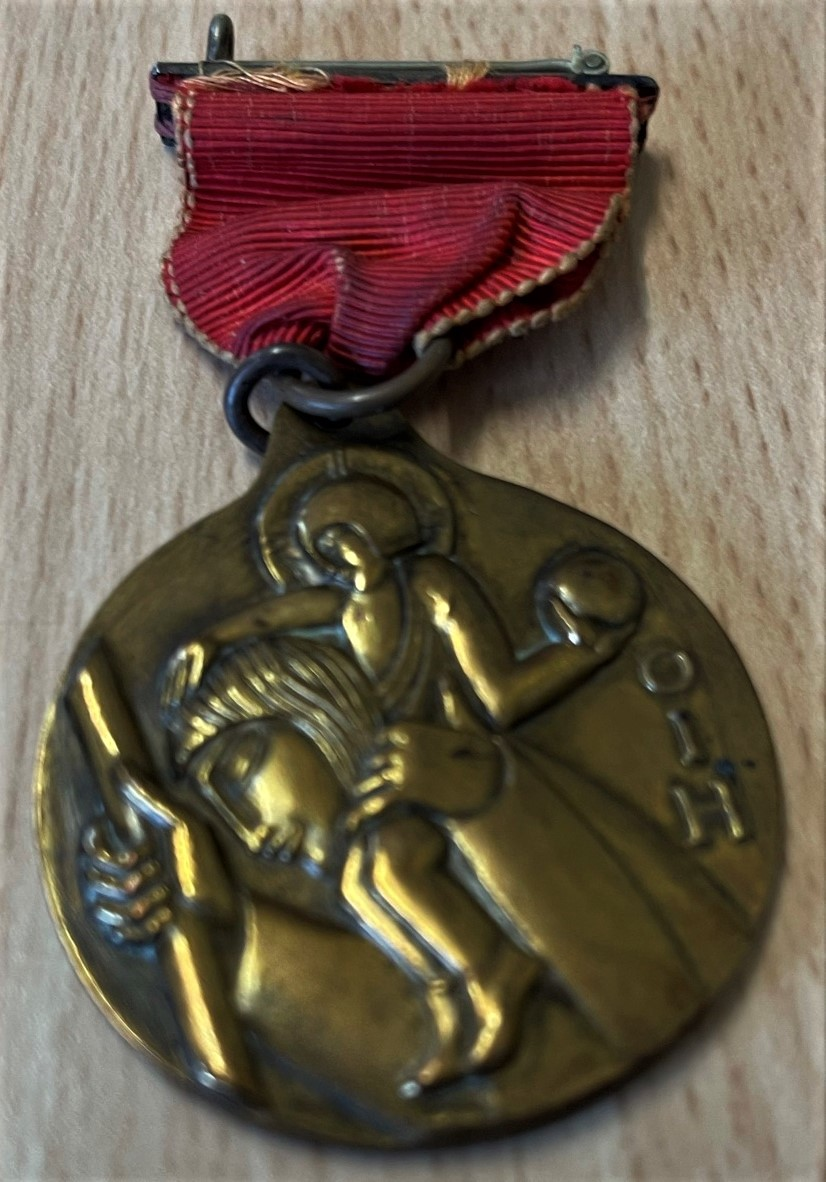
Order of Industrial Heroism Medal awarded by the Daily Herald to Philip Yates after the Bentley Colliery disaster of 1931.

The Herald's records relating to the award are held in the Trades Union Congress Library Collections at London Metropolitan University. The Modern Records Centre at the University of Warwick holds correspondence about the possible continuation of the award, after 1964, in its TUC collection (Ref MSS.292B/790/2).

Examples of the medal are in several museums, including the March & District Museum, Abertillery and District Museum, Dorman Museum, and the National Museum Wales; and one is in the House of Commons coins and medal collection; it was donated by Sir Arnold Wilson in 1938.

The British Museum holds a specimen of the medal, with Gill's name inscribed on the rim. It also has Gill's 1923 proof copy of the woodcut artwork used on the award's certificates, which has "The Holy Ghost as a dove" in the place of the eventual red star. Other copies are in the Tate collection, the Fitzwilliam Museum, Cambridge, the Fine Arts Museums of San Francisco, and the Hesburgh Library] at the University of Notre Dame. The "dove" version was also published in Engravings by Eric Gill (1929).

== See also ==
- British and Commonwealth orders and decorations
- Hero of Socialist Labour
- Edward Medal
- George Cross
- George Medal
- Queen's Commendation for Brave Conduct
- Queen's Gallantry Medal
