= Ben Gimbert =

Engine driver involved in the Soham rail disaster

Benjamin Gimbert
- Born: 6 February 1903; Ely, Cambridgeshire, England
- Died: 6 May 1976 (aged 73); March, Cambridgeshire, England
- Resting place: Eastwood Road Cemetery, March, Cambridgeshire
- Occupation: Driver with the London and North Eastern Railway
- Known for: Hero of Soham rail disaster
- Awards: George Cross; Order of Industrial Heroism

Benjamin Gimbert GC (6 February 1903 – 6 May 1976) was a British engine driver with the London and North Eastern Railway and a recipient of both the George Cross and the Order of Industrial Heroism. Alongside fireman James Nightall, Gimbert was recognised for saving an ammunition train from a fire on 2 June 1944 during the Soham rail disaster.

== Early life ==
Gimbert was born on 6 February 1903 in Ely (now in Cambridgeshire), the son of farm labourer George William Gimbert and his wife Florence. He moved to Peterborough in 1918, working as a cleaner for the Great Eastern Railway (GER) before being promoted to fireman in 1921. He was married in the town of March in 1926. In 1942 he became a driver for the London & North Eastern Railway (which had been created in 1923 by the amalgamation of the GER with other railways).

== George Cross ==
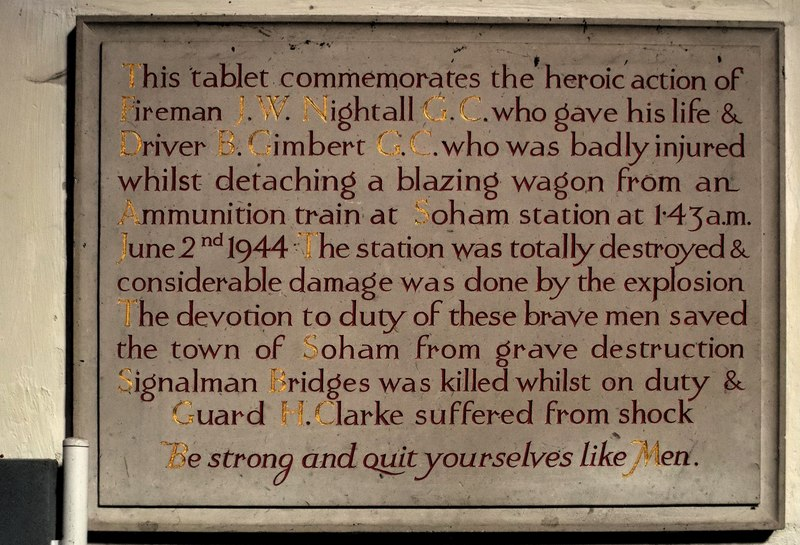
Memorial tablet in St Andrews Church, Soham to James Nightall and Benjamin Gimbert

On 2 June 1944, Gimbert was involved in a serious railway accident at Soham in Cambridgeshire, whilst driving an ammunition train. For their part in the events of that day, both he and his fireman colleague, James Nightall, were awarded the George Cross, the latter posthumously.

The citation for the award of Gimbert's George Cross reads:

As an ammunition train was pulling into a station in Cambridgeshire, the driver, Gimbert, discovered that the wagon next to the engine was on fire. He immediately drew Nightall's attention to the fire and brought the train to a standstill. By the time the train had stopped the whole of the truck was enveloped in flames and, realising the danger, the driver instructed the fireman to try to uncouple the truck immediately behind the blazing vehicle. Without the slightest hesitation Nightall, although he knew that the truck contained explosives, uncoupled the vehicle and rejoined his driver on the footplate.

The blazing van was close to the station buildings and was obviously liable to endanger life in the village. The driver and fireman realised that it was essential to separate the truck from the remainder of the train and run it into the open. Driver Gimbert set the engine in motion and as he approached a signal box he warned the signalman to stop any trains which were likely to be involved and indicated what he intended to do. Almost immediately the vehicle blew up. Nightall was killed and Gimbert was very severely injured.

Gimbert and Nightall were fully aware of the contents of the wagon which was on fire and displayed outstanding courage and resource in endeavouring to isolate it. When they discovered that the wagon was on fire they could easily have left the train and sought shelter, but realising that if they did not remove the burning vehicle the whole of the train, which consisted of 51 wagons of explosives, would have blown up, they risked their lives in order to minimise the effect of the fire. There is no doubt that if the whole train had been involved, as it would have been but for the gallant action of the men concerned, there would have been serious loss of life and property.

Gimbert was also awarded the Order of Industrial Heroism, a private civil award given by the Daily Herald newspaper, and the LNER's silver medal for Courage and Resource. In 1953 he received the Queen Elizabeth II Coronation Medal.

== Memorials ==
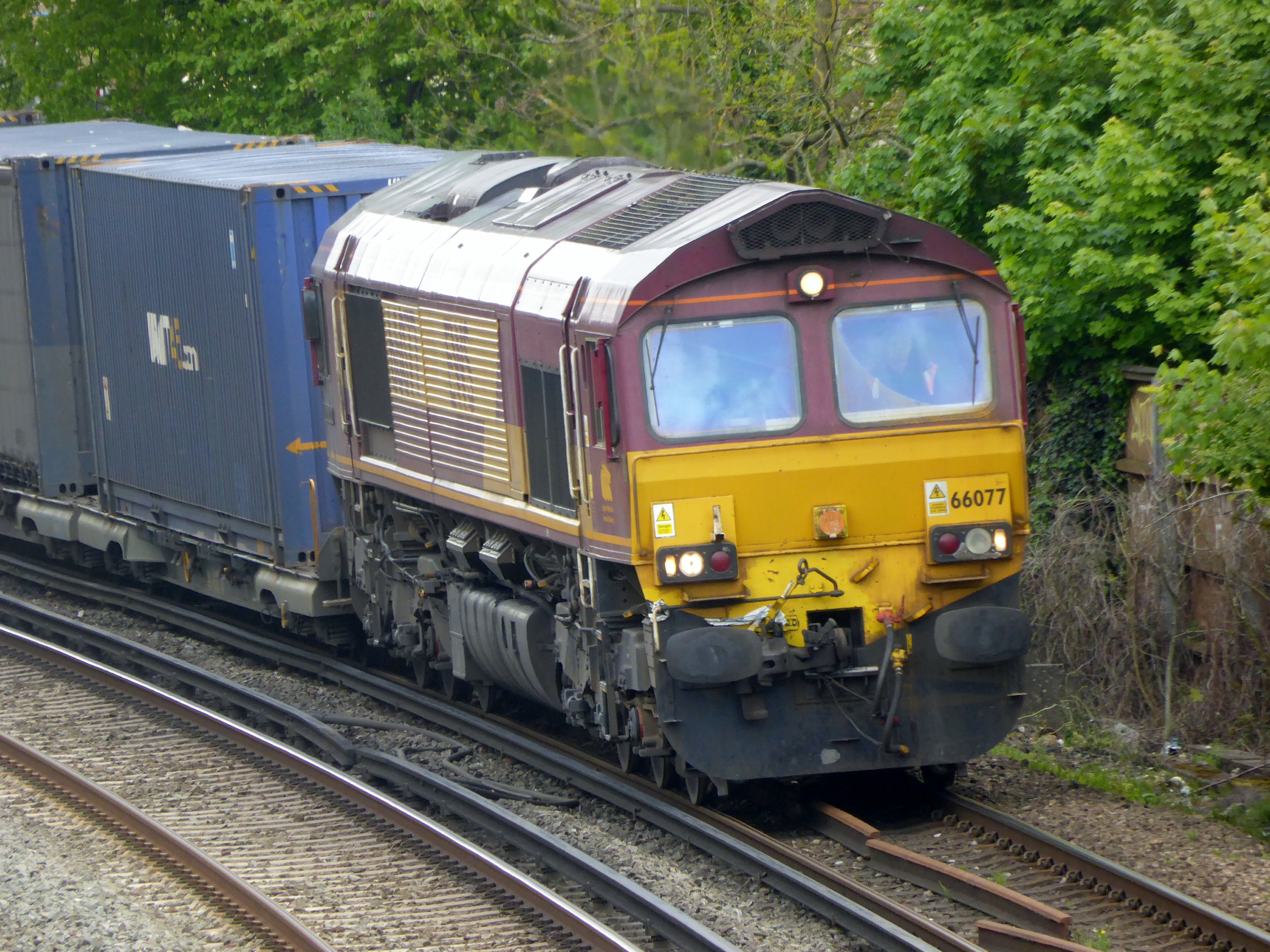
"Benjamin Gimbert GC" (66 077)

Gimbert died on 6 May 1976 and was buried in Eastwood Cemetery in March. In 1984, his medals were bought by March Town Council and are on permanent loan to March Museum.

On 28 September 1981 two British Rail Class 47 locomotives were named in honour of the two railwaymen: No. 47577 was named "Benjamin Gimbert, GC" and No. 47579 "James Nightall, GC". The nameplate "Benjamin Gimbert GC" was transferred to 47 574 in July 1987 at Stratford depot. It remained on this locomotive for 10 years. On 2 June 2004 new "Benjamin Gimbert GC" nameplates were applied to Class 66 077 at Whitemoor yard (March). Also the Norfolk Green bus company named Optare Solo 617 (MX55WCV) after Gimbert.
