= Clearance Diving Branch (RAN) =

Diving unit of the Royal Australian Navy

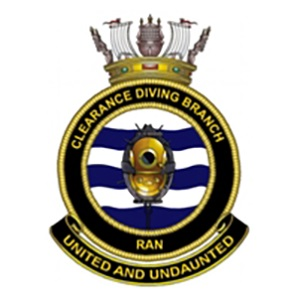
- Clearance Diving Branch Badge
- Active: 1951–present
- Country: Australia
- Branch: Royal Australian Navy
- Type: Clearance diving
- Role: Expeditionary Reconnaissance and Clearance; Maritime Explosive Ordnance Disposal; Underwater Damage Repair; Counter-terrorism
- Size: Two AUSCDT
- Part of: Mine Warfare and Clearance Diving Group
- Garrison/HQ: HMAS Waterhen, New South Wales; HMAS Stirling, Western Australia
- Nicknames: Bubbleheads; Bubblies
- Mottos: United and Undaunted
- Engagements: Vietnam War; Gulf War; • Operation Desert Storm; 1999 East Timorese crisis; • INTERFET; Iraq War; Afghanistan War; • Operation Slipper
- Decorations: Meritorious Unit Citation; Presidential Unit Citation (United States); Navy Unit Commendation (United States); Meritorious Unit Commendation (United States)

The Clearance Diving Branch is the specialist diving unit of the Royal Australian Navy (RAN) whose versatile role covers all spheres of military diving, and includes explosive ordnance disposal and maritime counter-terrorism. The Branch has evolved from traditional maritime diving, and explosive ordnance disposal, to include a special operations focus.

== History ==
The RAN has used divers on a regular basis since the 1920s, but it was not until World War II that clearance diving operations came to the fore, with RAN divers working alongside Royal Navy divers to remove naval mines from British waters, and from the waters of captured ports on the European mainland such as Hugh Syme, John Mould, George Gosse and Leon Goldsworthy all highly decorated. RAN divers were also used in performing duties including reconnaissance of amphibious landing sites. The skills learned in the European theatre were brought back to Australia, and used in the war against Japan. After the war, RAN divers were used during the clean-up of Australian and Papua New Guinea waters of defensive mines.

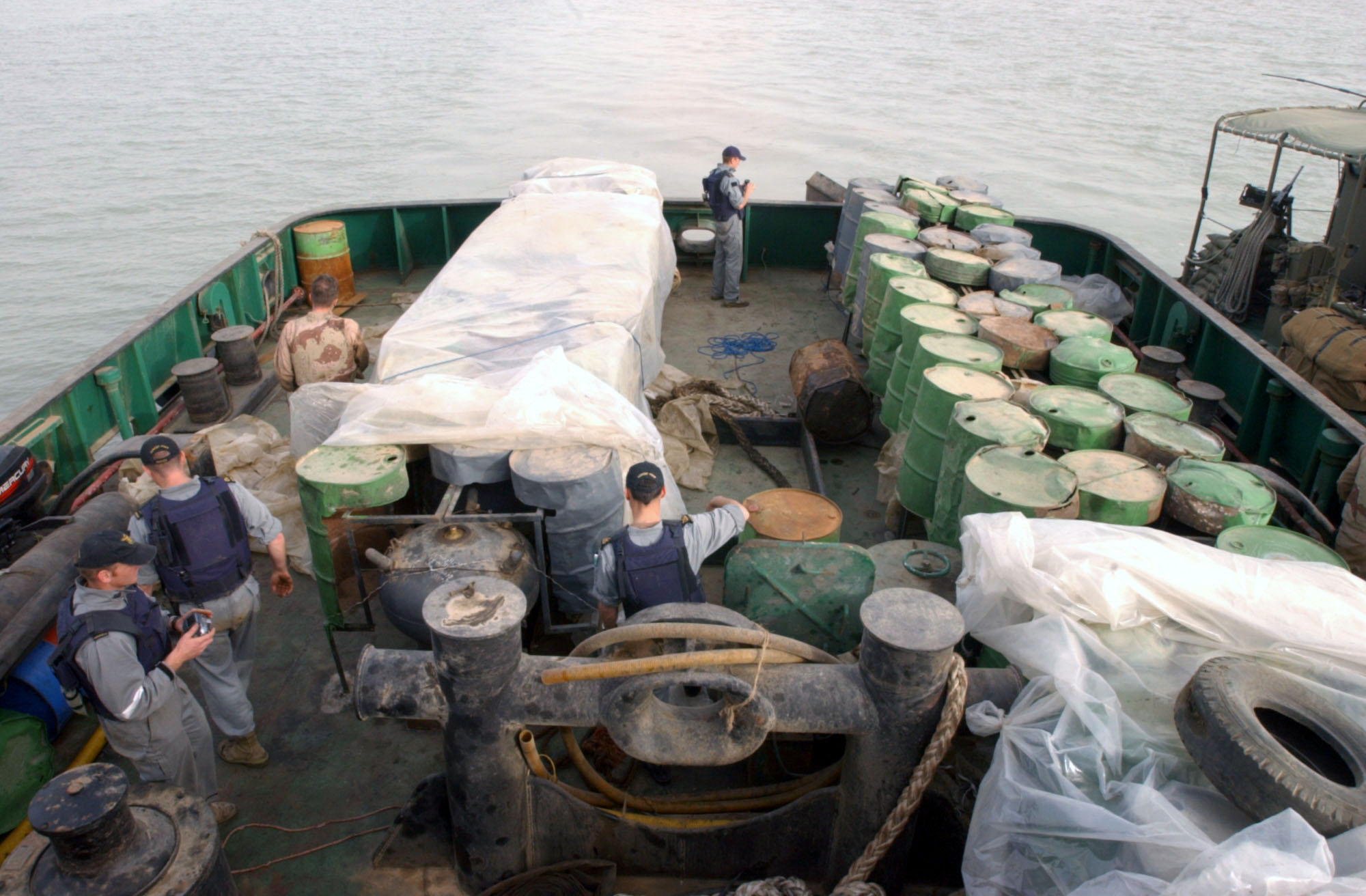
Inspecting clandestine naval mines in the Persian Gulf, 2003.

The utility of clearance and commando divers demonstrated during and after World War II prompted the Australian Commonwealth Naval Board to establish a clearance diving branch within the RAN in 1951. Divers were initially attached to the Underwater Research and Development Unit, based at HMAS Rushcutter. In 1956, they were organised into a separate Mobile Clearance Diving Team. In March 1966, the divers underwent further reorganisation, splitting into two Clearance Diving Teams. Clearance Diving Team 1 (CDT 1) was the operational team assigned to mine clearance and reconnaissance operations throughout the Australia Station, while Clearance Diving Team 2 (CDT 2) was dedicated to mine warfare in the Sydney area, but was not cleared for operations outside this area.

In late 1966, Clearance Diving Team 3 (CDT 3) was established specifically for deployment to the Vietnam War to assist the overworked United States Navy Explosive Ordnance Disposal units, and to give RAN personnel in clearance diving work in an operational environment. Sending CDT 1 or CDT 2, in full or in part, would have impacted on the teams' existing commitments, along with the continuity of training and postings. CDT 3 was formed from available personnel; this was sufficient to keep a six-man team on station in Vietnam from early 1967 until early 1971, with six-month deployments. CDT 3 was disbanded at the end of the Vietnam War, but the designation is reactivated for overseas wartime deployments, including in 1991 for the Gulf War, and again in 2003 for the Iraq War.

== Structure ==
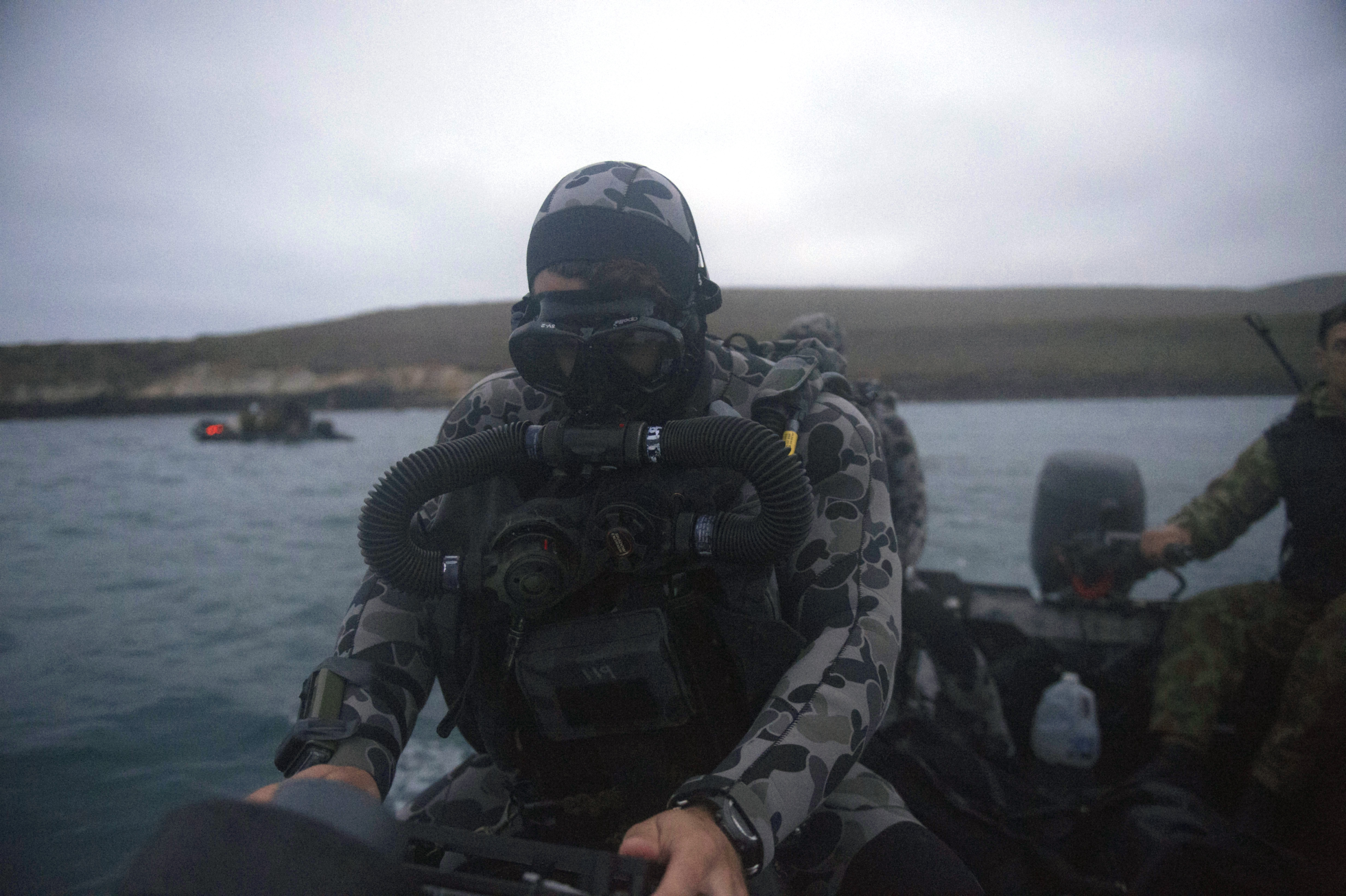
Clearance Diver preparing to conduct a maritime tactical operations dive using Divex Shadow Excursion rebreather during Exercise RIMPAC 2016 in Southern California

The Clearance Diving Branch consists of:

- Clearance Diving Team One (AUSCDT1); assigned to the east of Australia and based at HMAS Waterhen in New South Wales
- Clearance Diving Team Four (AUSCDT4); assigned to the west of Australia and based at HMAS Stirling in Western Australia

For overseas operational deployments, the designation of Clearance Diving Team Three (AUSCDT3) is used for a specifically formed team.

The Royal Australian Naval Reserve has eight Reserve Diving Teams (ANRDT) which provide supplementary or surge capability in support of regular CDTs in addition to localised fleet underwater taskings:

- Reserve Diving Team Five (ANRDT5) – based at HMAS Waterhen
- Reserve Diving Team Six (ANRDT6) – based in Melbourne
- Reserve Diving Team Seven (ANRDT7) – based at HMAS Stirling
- Reserve Diving Team Eight (ANRDT8) – based in Brisbane
- Reserve Diving Team Nine (ANRDT9) – based in Adelaide
- Reserve Diving Team Ten (ANRDT10) – based in Hobart
- Reserve Diving Team Eleven (ANRDT11) – based in Darwin
- Reserve Diving Team Twelve (ANRDT12) – based in Cairns

== Role ==
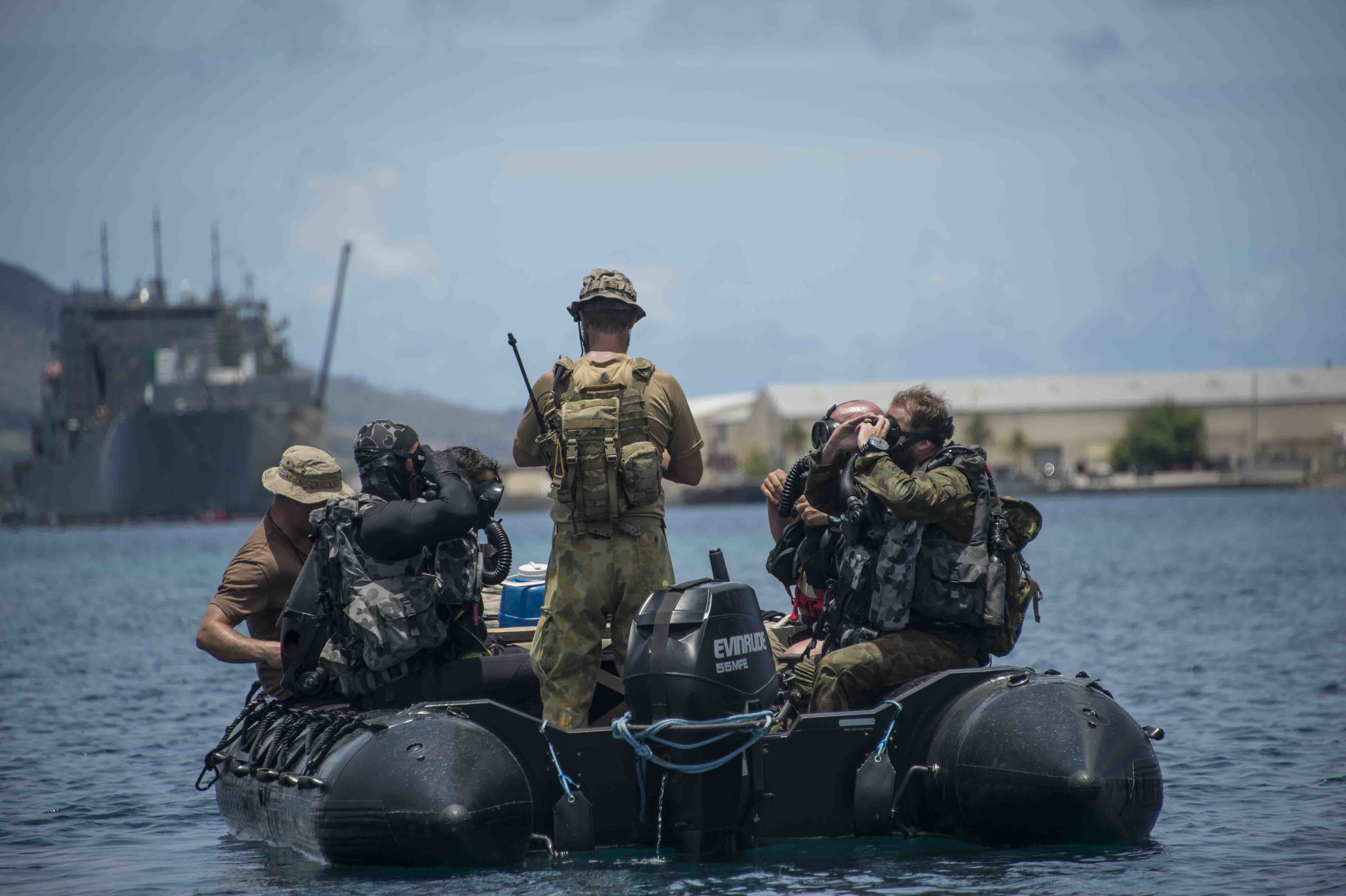
Clearance Divers prepare to enter the water during a Very Shallow Water (VSW) scenario during Exercise Tricrab 2016 in Guam

The Clearance Diving Branch force elements are: (Note: Since 2015, new force element names have been used such as "Expeditionary Reconnaissance and Clearance" indicating a recent restructure of the Clearance Diving Teams. In 2012, the Clearance Diving Teams had been restructured into five force elements.)

1. Maritime Tactical Operations (MTO):

- Clandestine beach reconnaissance (including back of beach operations up to 2 km inland)
- Clandestine hydrographic survey of seabed prior to an amphibious assault
- Clandestine clearance or demolition of sea mines and/or obstacles
- Clandestine placing of demolitions charges for the purpose of diversion or demonstration (ship/wharf attacks)
- Clandestine document collection

2. Mine Counter Measures (MCM):

- Location and disposal of sea mines in shallow waters
- Rendering safe and recovering enemy mines
- The search for and disposal of ordnance below the high water mark
- Clearance of surface ordnance in port or on naval facilities
- Search for, rendering safe or disposal of all ordnance in RAN ships and facilities

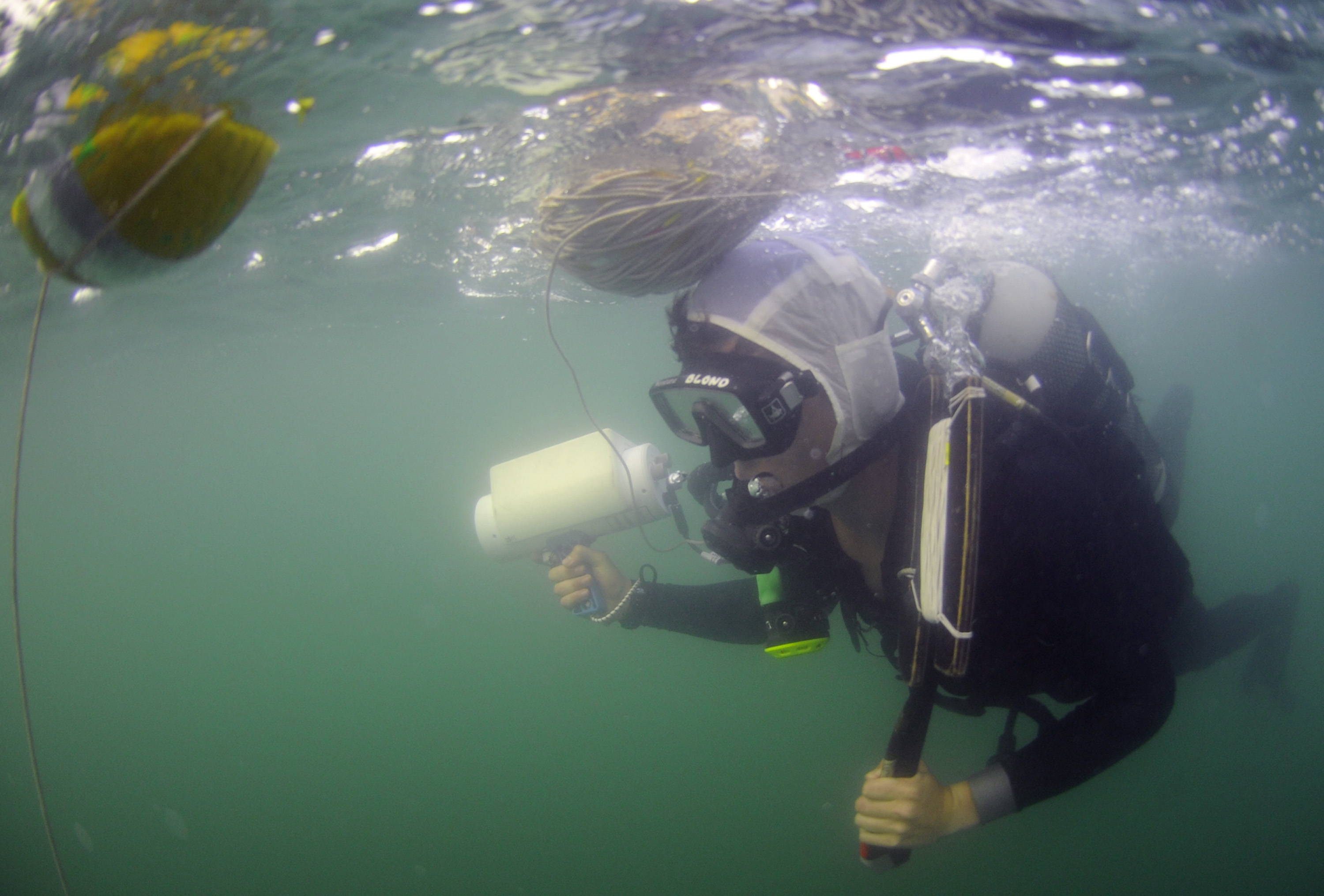
Clearance Diver performs an underwater search with a handheld sonar during Exercise RIMPAC 2012 in Pearl Harbor

3. Underwater Battle Damage Repair (UBDR):

- Surface supplied breathing apparatus diving
- Use of underwater tools including welders, explosive nailguns and pneumatic drills and chainsaws

4. Task Group Explosive Ordnance Disposal (TGEOD):

- Embarking on warships for Operation MANITOU rotations in the Middle East to provide specialist support for boarding parties with improvised explosive devices (IED) and explosive ordnance

5. Maritime counter terrorism-explosive ordnance disposal (MCT-EOD):

- Provide explosive ordnance (EOD) and improvised explosive device disposal (IEDD) support at a rapid speed for direct assault missions conducted by Australian Defence Force units.

A Clearance Diver may be posted to a Clearance Diving Team, Huon Class Minehunter Coastal ship, training position in the Australian Defence Force Diving School at HMAS Penguin and can apply to serve in the Tactical Assault Group-East (TAG-E).

Since January 2002, Special Duties Units of Clearance Divers from AUSCDT1 and AUSCDT4 have provided the maritime counter terrorism element of Tactical Assault Group-East (TAG-E), attached to the Australian Army 2nd Commando Regiment, which became operational on 22 July 2002 to respond to terrorist incidents in the Eastern States of Australia. Clearance Divers need to successfully pass the Army Special Forces Screen Test and then successfully complete specific elements of Commando Reinforcement Training before serving in either the water platoon as an assaulter or in the water sniper team in the sniper platoon. Service in TAG-E is normally 12 to 18 months online before rotating back into the Branch with divers able to rotate back into TAG-E after 12 to 18 months offline.

== Selection and training ==
The RAN's diver training program is commenced with a 5-day Clearance Diver Aptitude Assessment, or CDAA, focused on demonstrating in-water confidence, physical endurance, mental resilience and attention, and supported through psychological assessment. CDAA is aimed to ensure officer and sailor clearance diver candidates have the right aptitude to commence the lengthy training program. Historically there have been a few variants, including the 10-day clearance diver acceptance test (CDAT), colloquially known as "hell week". During CDAT, candidates began each day at 02:00, and were put through over thirty staged dives designed to test their strength and endurance. CDAT was shortened to a 7-day program, then into the current 5-day program with an increasing emphasis on in-water confidence and endurance.

Upon passing aptitude assessment, students must successfully pass the 60-week Clearance Diver Initial Employment Training course. In 2019, the first females graduated from the Clearance Diver Initial Employment Training course. Clearance Divers who are promoted to Leading Seaman Clearance Diver complete the Intermediate Clearance Diver course and for Petty Officer Clearance Diver complete the Advanced Clearance Diver course. Officers complete the Clearance Diving component of the Mine Warfare and Clearance Diving Officers course.

The MCT-EOD role requires clearance divers to be trained in specialist insertion techniques including diving, fast roping and parachuting.

== Operations ==
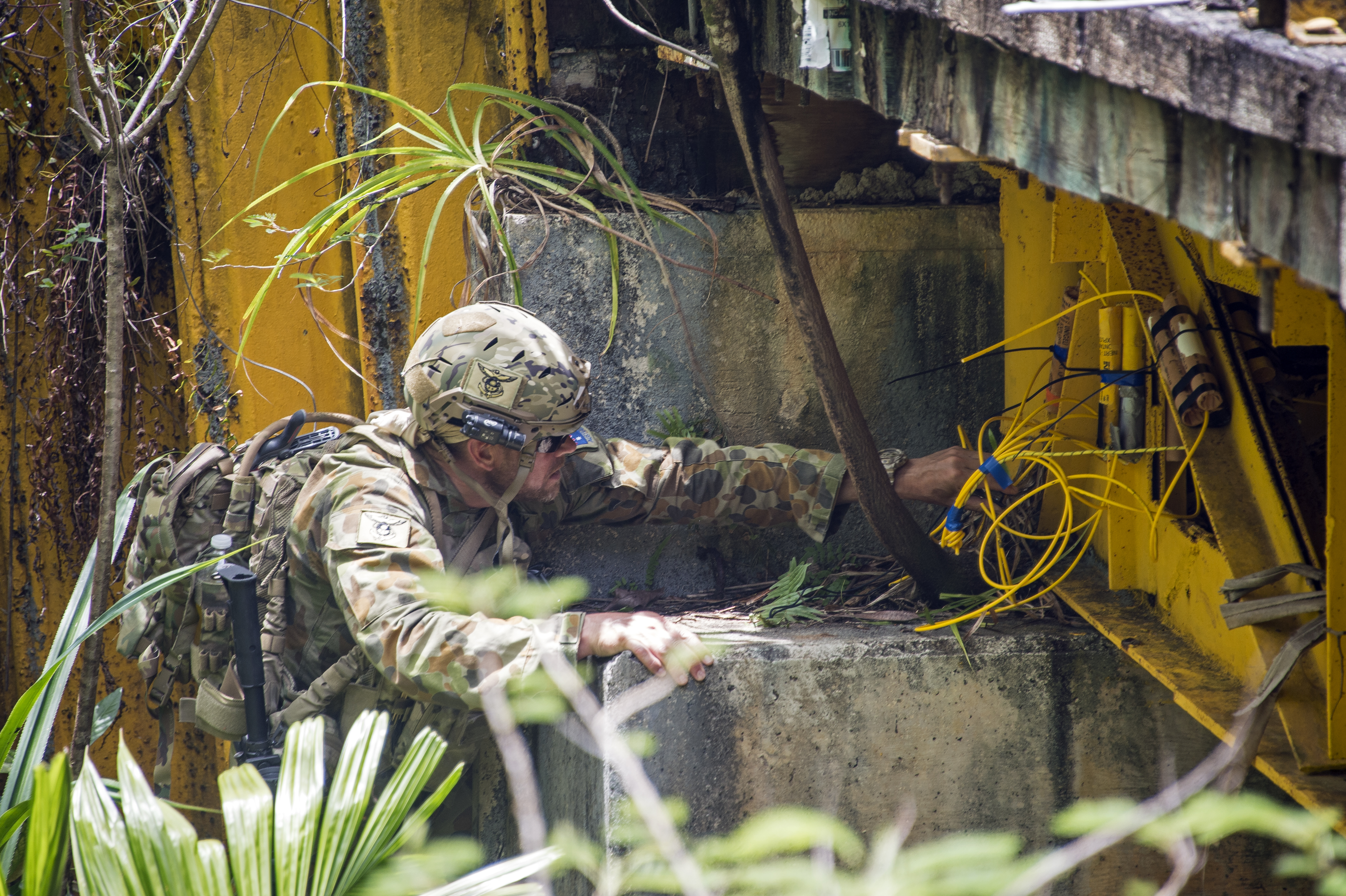
Clearance Diver inspects an Improvised Explosive Device (IED) during Exercise Tricrab 2016 in Guam

- In the Vietnam War, Clearance Diving Team 3 was awarded the United States Presidential Unit Citation, the United States Navy Unit Commendation twice, and the United States Meritorious Unit Commendation for its mine clearance work: see Non-US recipients of US gallantry awards.
- Took part in Operation Navy Help
- 1991: Performed mine clearance operations for coalition forces during the Gulf War.
- 1999: In the East Timor independence crisis as part of INTERFET, CDTs clandestinely mapped harbours and beaches in preparation for the arrival of peacekeepers.
- 2003: In Operation Falconer (the invasion phase of the Iraq War), CDTs were attached to Commander Task Unit 55.4.3, along with US and British partners, tasked with conducting deep/shallow water mine counter measure operations to clearing shipping lanes. CDTs notably participated in opening up the port at Umm Qasr.
- 2003–2009: In Operation Catalyst (post-invasion Iraq), CDTs were attached to Coalition counter improvise explosive device (IED) task forces.
- 2008–2013: In Operation Slipper – CDTs deployed explosive ordnance disposal (EOD) technicians in Afghanistan and provided tactical boarding parties for ships combating smugglers and piracy.

== See also ==
- List of military diving units

== Notes ==
Footnotes

Citations
