= List of Australian George Cross recipients =

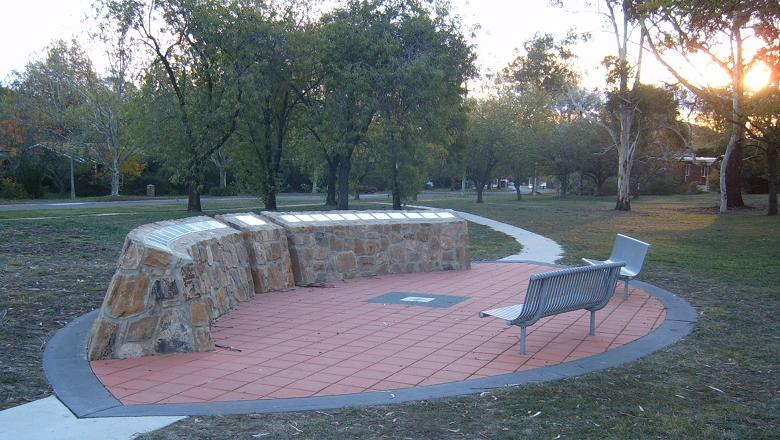
Memorial to Australian recipients of the George Cross, George Cross Park, Canberra.

The George Cross (GC) is the highest civil decoration for heroism in the United Kingdom and formerly for the British Empire. The GC is awarded to civilians for "acts of the greatest heroism" or to military personnel for heroic acts that are not "in the face of the enemy". King George VI announced the institution of the GC and George Medal in an official radio broadcast on 23 September 1940 to recognise individual acts of bravery performed during the Blitz. Australians received the GC under the Imperial honours system. Australia began to transition to its own honours system from 1975, though the Governor-General of Australia and each of the state governors retained the right to recommend Australians for British honours. The last Australian recommendation for the GC was thus made by the Governor of Victoria in 1978 for Constable Michael Pratt. On 5 October 1992, following more than two years of negotiations with the state governments, Prime Minister Paul Keating announced that Australia would make no further recommendations for Imperial honours. By then, the GC had been replaced by the Cross of Valour as Australia's highest civil decoration for heroism.

Between the first award of the GC to an Australian in 1942 and the final bestowal to Constable Pratt in 1978, 14 Australians were directly awarded the GC. Nine awards were to military personnel and five were to civilians. Eight of the awards were posthumous. At the time of the institution of the GC, all living recipients of the Empire Gallantry Medal (which included two Australians) were deemed holders of the GC. In October 1971, the British Government announced that living recipients of the Albert Medal and Edward Medal would also henceforth be considered recipients of the GC. The decision was due to the decline in the status and significance of the two awards, leading recipients to feel they were not receiving the recognition they were due. Unlike the 1940 Empire Gallantry Medal exchange, when it was mandatory for recipients to exchange insignia, the former Albert Medal and Edward Medal recipients had the option of retaining their insignia. Of the 27 Australian holders of the Albert Medal, six were living at the time and all opted to exchange their insignia. Five of the six received the GC from Queen Elizabeth II at Buckingham Palace in 1972. None of the eight Australians awarded the Edward Medal were thought to be alive in 1971, and thus no Australian swapped their Edward Medal for the GC. However, subsequent research discovered that miner Frank Duller lived until 1983—twelve years after the first offer to exchange—and his name was added to the GC Register as a recipient in 2017. Including exchange awards, a total of 23 Australians received the GC.

== Recipients ==
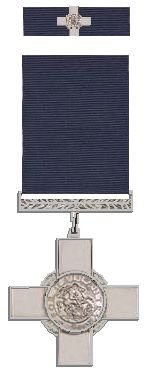
The George Cross

This along with the * (asterisk) indicates that the George Cross was awarded posthumously.
This along with the ^ indicates that the George Cross was awarded to military personnel for actions "not in the face of the enemy".

=== Direct awards of the George Cross ===
Name	Date of action	Organisation	Summary of action(s)	Notes
Eric Bailey	12 January 1945*	New South Wales Police Force	Apprehended a suspect while mortally wounded	
Raymond Donoghue	29 April 1960*	Metropolitan Tram Trust	Attempting to regain control of tram during accident	
Errol Emanuel	July 1969 – August 1971*	District Commissioner, Territory of Papua New Guinea	Resolving factional conflicts and restoring local government in Papua New Guinea	
Leon Goldsworthy^	12 June 1943 – 10 April 1944	Royal Australian Naval Volunteer Reserve	Mine recovery and defusion, Second World War	
George Gosse^	8–19 May 1945	Royal Australian Naval Volunteer Reserve	Mine recovery and defusion, Second World War	
Benjamin Gower Hardy^	5 August 1944*	Citizen Military Forces	Gallantry during Cowra breakout	
Ralph Jones^	5 August 1944*	Citizen Military Forces	Gallantry during Cowra breakout	
Horace Madden^	24 April 1951 – 6 November 1951*	Australian Army	Fortitude while a prisoner of war, Korean War	
Lionel Matthews^	August 1942 – March 1944*	Second Australian Imperial Force	Fortitude while a prisoner of war, Second World War	
John Mould^	14 November1941 – 30 June 1942	Royal Australian Naval Volunteer Reserve	Mine recovery and defusion, Second World War	
Michael Pratt	4 June 1976	Victoria Police Force	Intervention in an armed robbery	
Jonathan Rogers^	10 February 1964*	Royal Australian Navy	Gallantry during Melbourne-Voyager collision	
Hugh Syme^	19 May 1941 – 25 December 1942	Royal Australian Naval Volunteer Reserve	Mine recovery and defusion, Second World War	
Anthony Taylor	January–March 1951	Commonwealth Bureau of Mineral Resources	Gallantry during eruption of Mount Lamington, Papua New Guinea	

=== Empire Gallantry Medal, Albert Medal and Edward Medal exchanges ===
EGM = This indicates a recipient of the Empire Gallantry Medal who exchanged the award for the George Cross.
AM = This indicates a recipient of the Albert Medal who exchanged the award for the George Cross.
EM = This indicates a recipient of the Edward Medal who exchanged the award for the George Cross.

Name	Date of action	Organisation	Summary of action(s)	Notes
Arthur Bagot^	12 April 1918	Royal Naval Volunteer Reserve	Gallantry during engine room explosion on HM Motor Launch 356	AM
John Chalmers	4 February 1922	North Bondi Surf Life Saving Club	Rescue of swimmer during shark attack	AM
Frank Duller	12 July 1918	Civilian	Risked his life in an attempt to save a fellow miner	EM
Stanley Gibbs	3 January 1927	Civilian	Rescue of swimmer during shark attack	AM
Robert Kavanaugh	19 January 1929	Civilian	Rescue of swimmer during shark attack	AM
Frederick March	19 November 1924	Chauffeur to Governor-General of Sudan	Gallantry during assassination of the Governor-General of Sudan	EGM
William McAloney^	31 August 1937	Royal Australian Air Force	Attempted rescue of an officer trapped in a burning aircraft	AM
Richard Richards	9 October 1915 – 19 March 1916	Imperial Trans-Antarctic Expedition	Gallantry during Trans-Antarctic Expedition	AM
Patrick Taylor	15 May 1935	Australia-New Zealand mail flight	Gallantry during flight when the aircraft's starboard engine failed	EGM
