= Clearance Diving Team =

Clearance Diving Team refers to a team of Clearance divers, originally specialist naval divers who used explosives underwater to remove obstructions to make harbours and shipping channels safe to navigate, but later the term "clearance diver" was used to include other naval underwater work.

Clearance Diving Team may also refer to:

- One of the two Clearance Diving Teams of the Clearance Diving Branch (RAN), unit of the Royal Australian Navy (RAN), which is responsible for combat diving, clearance diving, maritime counter-terrorism and underwater repairs

== See also ==
- Frogman, naval divers in general
