= Bill Madden (soldier) =

Australian George Cross recipient (1924–1951)

Bill Madden GC
- Madden in 1947
- Born: Horace William Madden; 14 February 1924; Cronulla, New South Wales, Australia
- Died: c. 6 November 1951 (aged 27); Changsong, North Korea
- Burial place: United Nations Memorial Cemetery, Busan, South Korea
- Military career
- Allegiance: Australia
- Branch: Australian Army
- Service years: 1942–1947; 1950–1951
- Rank: Private
- Nickname: "Slim"
- Service number: N413400, NX173860, 2400186
- Units: 8th Field Ambulance; 5th Motor Ambulance Convoy Platoon; 253rd Supply Depot Platoon; 3rd Battalion, Royal Australian Regiment
- Conflicts: World War II; New Guinea campaign; Bougainville campaign; Occupation of Japan; Korean War; Battle of Kapyong (POW)
- Awards: George Cross

Horace William Madden (14 February 1924 – 6 November 1951) was an Australian Army soldier who was posthumously awarded the George Cross, the highest award for extraordinary acts of gallantry away from the field of battle that could be awarded to a member of the Australian armed forces at the time. The citation for his award highlighted his "undaunted" resistance and "outstanding heroism" while a prisoner of war of the Chinese forces during the Korean War, which was "an inspiration to all his fellow prisoners". It was the highest decoration awarded to an Australian during the Korean War.

Madden served in the New Guinea and Bougainville campaigns in the latter stages of World War II and, after service with the British Commonwealth Occupation Force in Japan, he returned to civilian life in 1947. He enlisted for service in the Korean War in 1950 and joined the 3rd Battalion, Royal Australian Regiment (3 RAR), in Korea in November of that year as a private. Madden participated with his unit in the constant offensives and counter-offensives – between the United Nations forces on one side and the North Korean and Chinese forces on the other – during early 1951 before being concussed and captured during the April Battle of Kapyong.

According to the historian Craig Blanch, from the time of his capture Madden obstinately resisted his captors, verbally abused them when they beat him, and maintained an unbroken spirit while assisting fellow prisoners. The beatings included rifle butt strikes to the chest which broke several ribs; he was further punished through restriction of rations and his physical condition deteriorated. Following a long forced march into North Korea, he died of malnutrition and ill-treatment in November 1951, aged 27.

Madden was posted as missing in action and his family did not learn of his death until 1953. Many of his fellow prisoners contributed witness statements to support the recommendation that he be posthumously awarded the George Cross, which was announced in December 1955 and presented to his sister the following year. In 1968, a portrait of Madden was painted by the artist Bruce Fletcher. The following year the 3 RAR other ranks' bar was named the "Madden Club" in his honour. His George Cross is displayed at the Australian War Memorial in Canberra.

== Early life ==
Horace William Madden was born in Cronulla, New South Wales, a southern beachside suburb of Sydney, on 14 February 1924 to Charles Bernard Madden, a labourer, and his wife Pearl Ellen née Clemson. He was one of three children of the couple, one of whom died in infancy. "Bill", as he was known, was working as a fruiterer's assistant when he was mobilised for service in World War II with the Militia on 26 May 1942 at Morisset, near Newcastle, north of Sydney. He was allocated the service number N413400.

== Military career ==
Madden was initially posted to the 114th Australian General Hospital located at Goulburn, New South Wales. As a member of the Militia, he was not required to serve outside of Australia or its territories, but he transferred to the Second Australian Imperial Force (AIF) – which was a volunteer military force for duty anywhere in the world – on 10 August 1943. He was enlisted as a driver and allocated the new AIF service number of NX173860. Nicknamed "Slim" due to his lean build, Madden initially saw service with the 8th Field Ambulance in the Territory of New Guinea during the eponymous campaign of the Pacific War, and contracted malaria. He later served as a driver with the 5th Motor Ambulance Convoy Platoon on Bougainville during the campaign there, and then he served with the 253rd Supply Depot Platoon on the island of Morotai in the Dutch East Indies. After the war ended, he was posted to Japan as part of the British Commonwealth Occupation Force (BCOF). He was discharged from the army on 2 June 1947.

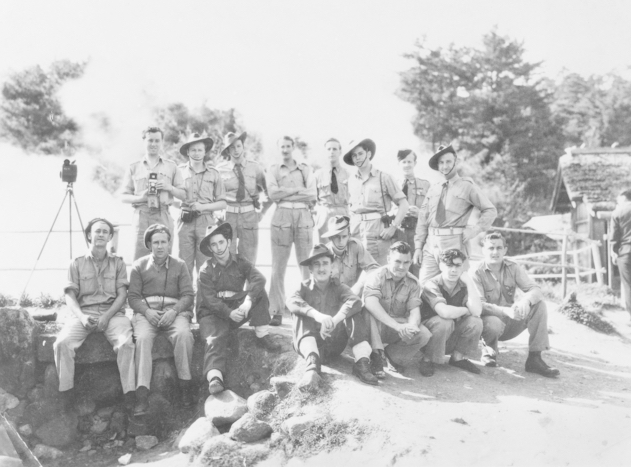
Bill Madden (back row, fourth from left) with a group of Australian soldiers serving in BCOF on leave at Beppu, Japan, in May 1947

After leaving the army, Madden worked as a nurse at the psychiatric hospital in Morisset for two years and then as a moulder. On 19 August 1950, Madden enlisted as a private in the special force that was being raised to serve in the Korean War, which had broken out two months earlier. He was allocated the service number 2400186. He joined the 3rd Battalion, Royal Australian Regiment (3 RAR) on 5 November, for duty as a driver. On the day Madden joined the battalion near Pakchon, 3 RAR had its first engagement with Chinese forces, which had recently entered the war in support of North Korea. The period that followed was perhaps the most dangerous and demanding period of the war. Madden volunteered to become a linesman in the signals platoon. This platoon often worked in extremely cold conditions to establish and maintain communications with the advanced elements of the unit. Under Chinese pressure, the US Eighth Army, the command under which 3 RAR and its parent 27th British Commonwealth Brigade operated, withdrew first to Pyongyang, then south of the 38th parallel – the border between the two Koreas – and by early December the unit was in reserve: 20 km (12 mi) south of the South Korean capital Seoul, where it remained until the beginning of 1951.

On 25 January 1951, the United Nations forces launched an offensive aimed at reaching the Han River, and they were able to advance 60 km (37 mi) in two weeks. In early February, 3 RAR was again in reserve, this time in positions around Yeoju, where in the face of a Chinese counteroffensive it participated in the relief of UN forces at Chipyong-ni later in February. Gradual advances were made by the UN forces in March, and by mid-month they had retaken Seoul. In February, 3 RAR's parent brigade had been reinforced with a Canadian unit, the 2nd Battalion of Princess Patricia's Canadian Light Infantry (PPCLI). The Eighth Army line was advanced in stages with consolidation at each stage. In April, the objective of Operation Rugged was the "Kansas Line", running west of the Imjin River about 45 km (28 mi) north of Seoul. The 27th Brigade pushed a Chinese force aside to capture the valley of the Kapyong River, a tributary of the Pukhan River, by 8 April. The brigade then pushed forward to the "Utah Line", with 3 RAR capturing two hills with the assistance of US air support. After consolidation of the position, 3 RAR and its parent brigade were withdrawn into US IX Corps reserve, and handed over its captured positions to Republic of Korea (ROK) forces.

On the night of 22 April, the ROK forces on the "Utah Line" were heavily attacked by large Chinese forces and almost immediately gave ground and then broke. On the afternoon of 23 April, the 27th Brigade was ordered to establish a blocking position north of the village of Kapyong. This was initially a precautionary measure, but by evening disorganised and panicking groups of ROK soldiers were moving south through the brigade position. The corps placed additional artillery under the command of the brigade, and took up hasty defensive positions, with 3 RAR on Hill 504 to the east of the river and 2 PPCLI on Hill 677 to the west. The battalions created company-sized defensive positions on the summits and slopes of the two hills. The Chinese attacked in force in the early hours of 24 April, and for 3 RAR the Battle of Kapyong continued until late on 25 April (Anzac Day) when 3 RAR conducted a fighting withdrawal. There were two main battles within the 3 RAR perimeter, one in front of Hill 504 and one around battalion headquarters, and Chinese troops tried to infiltrate the Australian positions by mingling with the fleeing ROK troops.

== Capture and death ==
During the fighting around battalion headquarters, Madden was laying a telephone line when he was concussed by an enemy grenade. Later in the battle, he was flung by another explosion into a weapon pit where two other signallers were taking cover, one of whom was Private Robert Parker. During the fighting withdrawal, Madden struggled with the effects of his concussion, and when urged to move by his platoon sergeant, he told him he was "stuffed" and needed a rest but would "catch up". Madden and two other members of the battalion, Parker and Private Keith Roy Gwyther, were soon after captured by the Chinese. They were the only members of the battalion who were captured during the battle, which cost the battalion 32 dead and 59 wounded. All three were initially posted as missing in action.

Upon capture, the prisoners were marched north. On the long trek, little food or water was provided to them. At one point, Madden traded the last of his tobacco for a small piece of salted fish, which he shared with Parker. Madden highly valued his World War II service medal ribbons, and according to the historian Craig Blanch, when the Chinese took them he responded with unbridled verbal abuse. Madden directed the same treatment towards guards who beat him to keep him moving on the march. The Chinese punishments meted out to Madden included severe restrictions on the food he received, but what he did get he shared with other sick prisoners. Despite this and other punishments, Blanch stated that Madden's spirit remained unbroken. Gwyther said of Madden, "Slim was a real hero – and didn't even know it. He became a sort of legend. He didn't try to be like that – it was the way he was made. Nothing could make him co-operate with the enemy."

The prisoners reached "Bean Camp", a major prisoner-of-war collection point about 55 km (34 mi) southeast of Pyongyang, but Madden's health deteriorated quickly, so he was left there when the rest of the prisoners were marched further north towards the Yalu River that forms the border between China and North Korea. Madden was later transferred to the "Caves Camp" at Kandong near Pyongyang. In November 1951, he was one of a multinational group of prisoners who were forced marched 300 km (190 mi) north to Changsong on the Yalu River. This march was conducted in freezing conditions without adequate clothing or food. One of the other prisoners was Captain (later General) Anthony Farrar-Hockley, of the 1st Battalion, Gloucestershire Regiment. Farrar-Hockley stated that not one man in the group was fit for a march of this nature. Another captive who participated in the march was Warrant Officer Ronald David Guthrie, a pilot from No. 77 Squadron RAAF who had been shot down over North Korea. Guthrie saw Madden on the march and observed his shocking physical condition. Madden had been beaten around the chest with a rifle butt, and his chest was misshapen due to broken ribs. Guthrie was struck by Madden's absolute determination and his concern for his fellow captives. An example of this was that Madden had somehow managed to retain his wristwatch, and traded it with locals for food which he handed out to the other prisoners. Madden's condition continued to deteriorate until he could not walk any longer. He was placed on a cart for transport, but by this time he "was so thin that he looked like a skeleton covered with a little skin", according to Farrar-Hockley. Despite his condition he told Guthrie, "They'll never make fertilizer out of me. I'll make it." Madden died of malnutrition and the result of ill-treatment soon after the group arrived at Changsong, around 6 November, aged 27. He was the only Australian to die in captivity during the war. After the war ended, Farrar-Hockley wrote affectionately of him to Madden's sister, Florence. He was with Madden when he died, and assured her that "he did not die in pain; and was only semi-conscious throughout the last two days of his life, at the end of which, unable to stand a final bout of enteritis, he passed away."

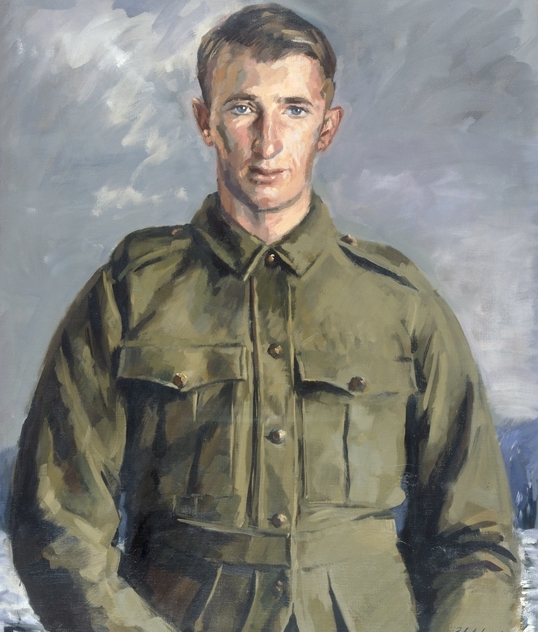
Oil painting portrait of Bill Madden GC by Bruce Fletcher

Madden remained posted as missing in action until 1953 when his family was told of his death. Guthrie and others provided witness statements regarding Madden's courage, and a posthumous recommendation was made for Madden to be awarded the George Cross, the highest award for extraordinary acts of gallantry away from the field of battle that could be awarded to a member of the Australian armed forces at the time. On 27 December 1955, Madden's award of the George Cross was announced in the London Gazette. The citation read:

Private Madden was captured by Chinese Communist Forces on 24th April 1951 near Kapyong. He was a signaller attached to Battalion Headquarters at the time and received concussion prior to capture.

Private Madden was held prisoner by the enemy until about 6th November 1951, when he died of malnutrition and the result of ill-treatment. During this period he openly resisted all enemy efforts to force him to collaborate, to such a degree that his name and example were widely known through the various groups of prisoners. Testimonials have been provided by officers and men from many units of the Commonwealth and Allied Forces which show that the heroism he displayed was quite outstanding.

Despite repeated beatings and many other forms of ill-treatment inflicted because of his defiance to his captors, Private Madden remained cheerful and optimistic. Although deprived of food because of his behaviour, resulting in severe malnutrition, he was known to share his meagre supplies purchased from Koreans with other prisoners who were sick.

It would have been apparent to Private Madden that to pursue this course must eventually result in his death. This did not deter him, and for over six months, although becoming progressively weaker, he remained undaunted in his resistance. He would in no way co-operate with the enemy.

This gallant soldier's outstanding heroism was an inspiration to all his fellow prisoners.

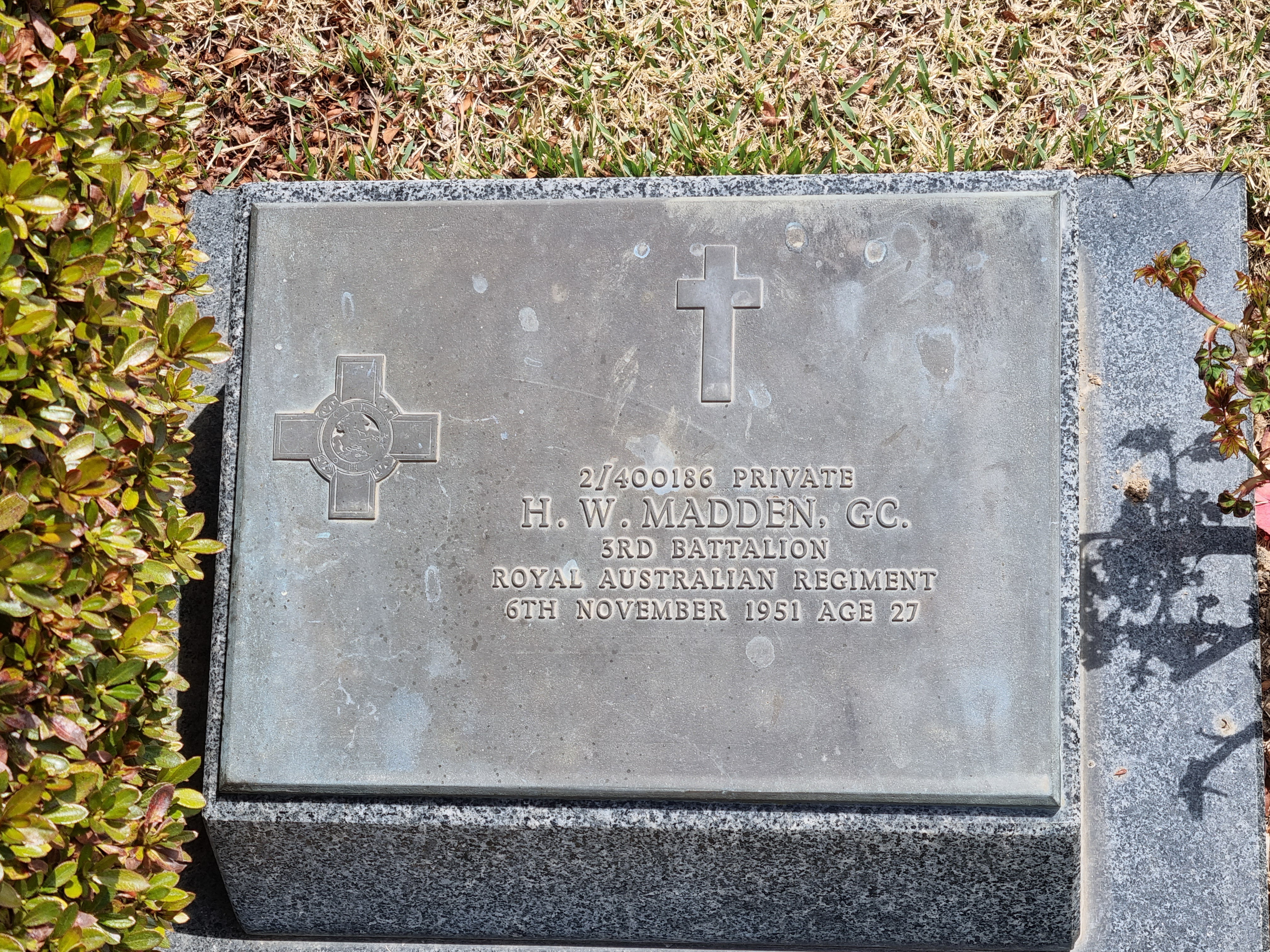
Madden's grave at the UN Memorial Cemetery

Madden's George Cross was presented to his sister, Mrs Florence Regan, at Government House, Sydney, on 9 May 1956 by the Governor of New South Wales, Lieutenant General Sir John Northcott. It was the highest decoration awarded to an Australian during the Korean War. As of 2024 Madden's George Cross is held and displayed by the Australian War Memorial (AWM). Madden's body was recovered following the Korean Armistice Agreement and was subsequently buried in the United Nations Memorial Cemetery at Busan, South Korea. In 1968, the artist Bruce Fletcher painted a portrait of Madden which is held in the collection of the AWM. When Lieutenant Colonel Peter Scott – a 3 RAR Korean War veteran himself – took command of 3 RAR in 1969 prior to its second deployment to South Vietnam, he arranged for the soldier's canteen to be named the "Madden Club" in honour of Bill Madden.
