= Eric Bailey (GC) =

Australian police officer (1906–1945)

Eric George Bailey
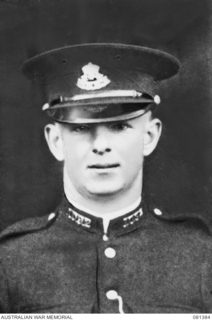
- Born: 14 October 1906; Tenterfield, New South Wales
- Died: 12 January 1945 (aged 38); Orange, New South Wales
- Resting place: Rookwood Cemetery, Sydney
- Police career
- Country: Australia
- Department: New South Wales Police Force
- Service years: 1927–1945
- Rank: Sergeant 3rd Class
- Awards: George Cross; George Lewis Trophy; Certificate of Merit, Royal Humane Society of Australasia

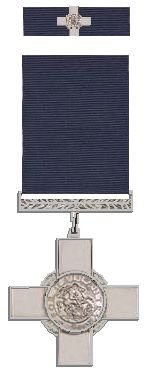
George Cross and its ribbon bar

Eric George Bailey GC (14 October 1906 – 12 January 1945) was a sergeant with the New South Wales Police Force and a posthumous Australian recipient of the George Cross, the highest civil decoration for heroism in the United Kingdom and formerly in the Commonwealth.

== Career ==
Bailey had joined the Postmaster-General's Department at the age of 16. He joined the police on 16 March 1927, initially based at Sydney's No.4 Station. He later transferred to the station at The Rock, a small township about 20 miles from Wagga Wagga on 17 September 1928. In May 1929 he transferred to Gundagai, and then from May 1932 to April 1939 served successively at Narrandera, Deniliquin and Balranald. He was promoted to constable first class on 23 April 1938. On 20 April 1939 he moved to Moruya, where he was highly commended for his part in the rescue of survivors from the fishing trawler, Dureenbee, which had been attacked by a Japanese submarine on 3 August 1942. In 1945 he was transferred, for the final time, to Blayney, just eight days before his death.

=== George Cross ===
He was awarded the George Cross posthumously after being shot while on duty. The full citation was published in a supplement to the London Gazette of 25 October 1946 and read:

St. James's Palace, S.W.1, 29th October, 1946.

The KING has been graciously pleased to make the undermentioned awards of the GEORGE CROSS: —

Eric George BAILEY (deceased), Sergeant 3rd Class, New South Wales Police Force.

At about 8.30 p.m. on the 12th January, 1945, Sergeant Bailey (then a Constable 1st Class), whilst on duty in Adelaide Street, Blayney, had occasion to speak to a man whose movements were suspicious. During the questioning the man pulled a revolver from his pocket and fired a shot which struck Bailey in the stomach. The Constable immediately closed with his assailant who fired two more shots. Although fast succumbing to his injuries and suffering from the effects of shock and haemorrhage, Bailey continued the struggle with the offender and held him on the ground until assistance arrived. Shortly afterwards he died. The fortitude and courage manifested by this Police Officer, in spite of the mortal injuries sustained by him at the outset of the encounter, constitute bravery and devotion to duty of the highest order.

== Personal life ==
Bailey was married, to Florence, and had a daughter and son.

He is buried at Rookwood Cemetery, Sydney, grave no.1959, Section 8 Anglican.

Bailey was a cousin (first cousin, once removed) of Victoria Cross recipient Jack French.
