= John Bridge =

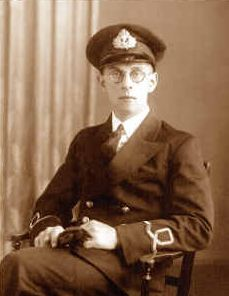
- Sub-Lieutenant John Bridge c.1940
- Born: 5 February 1915; Culcheth, Lancashire, England
- Died: 14 December 2006 (aged 91); Sunderland, Tyne and Wear, England
- Military career
- Allegiance: United Kingdom
- Branch: Royal Navy
- Service years: 1940–1946
- Rank: Lieutenant-Commander
- Conflicts: Second World War: Allied invasion of Italy; Normandy landings
- Awards: George Cross; George Medal & Bar; King's Commendation for Brave Conduct

Lieutenant-Commander John Bridge, GC, GM & Bar (5 February 1915 – 14 December 2006) was a British bomb disposal expert of the Royal Navy Volunteer Reserve during the Second World War and a recipient of the George Cross. He was the first person to be awarded a Bar to the George Medal.

== Early life ==
John Bridge was born on 5 February 1915 at Culcheth, near Warrington in Lancashire. He attended Leigh Grammar School, and read physics at the University of London He then completed a fourth year of study training to be a teacher at Westminster Training College, before taking up a post at Firth Park Secondary School in Sheffield as a physics teacher. He volunteered for the Navy in 1940.

== Second World War ==
Bridge led a squad which defused a bomb with a delayed action fuse in September 1940, for which he received the George Medal. In March 1941, he defused 15 bombs, including a bomb which had fallen in the Naval dockyard at HMNB Devonport, for which he received a King's Commendation for Brave Conduct. In October 1941 he was awarded a bar to his George Medal after defusing a bomb in the docks in Falmouth.

In 1943, Bridge cleared mines and depth charges from Messina harbour in Sicily, preparing the way for the Allied invasion of Italy. He made 28 dives to defuse groups of booby trapped depth charges and rendered safe another 207 mines and depth charges, tethered at or below the waterline. His longest dive during the action lasted twenty hours.

He served as a naval bomb safety officer during the Normandy landings of June 1944, defusing many bombs, mines, and shells. He cleared mines in the river Scheldt and various harbour basins in September of that year. He was then posted back to England and promoted to lieutenant commander.

For his work in Messina harbour, Bridge was awarded the George Cross in June 1944, although the investiture did not take place until March 1945, the citation for his George Cross read:

For the most conspicuous and prolonged bravery and contempt of death in clearing Messina Harbour of depth charges. The recommending officer stated that he had never before had the fortune to be associated with such cool and sustained bravery as Lieutenant Bridge displayed during the 10 days of the operation.

Bridge received the medal from King George VI at Buckingham Palace on 16 March 1945.

== Post-war and later life ==
After his military service Bridge returned to his previous profession of teaching in 1946. He became director of education for Sunderland borough council in 1963 and retired in 1976. He wrote a volume of wartime memoirs entitled Trip to Nijmegen.

The headquarters of the Fleet Diving Squadron of the Royal Navy is named the Bridge building after John Bridge. John Bridge died on 14 December 2006, aged 91, just before the official renaming ceremony. The Guard of Honour at his funeral was formed of Royal Navy Clearance Divers and he is considered one of the fathers of the branch.

== See also ==
- Hugh Syme; the only other holder of the GC, GM & Bar
