= Royal Australian Naval Volunteer Reserve =

Former reserve force of the Royal Australian Navy

- Active: 1921–1973
- Country: Australia
- Type: Navy
- Part of: Royal Australian Navy

Royal Australian Naval Volunteer Reserve (RANVR) was a reserve force of the Royal Australian Navy.

== Formation ==
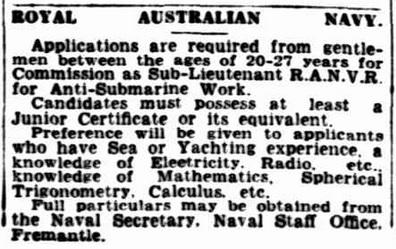
Recruiting advertisement of the Royal Australian Naval Volunteer Reserve (RANVR) 1941

In late 1920, the Navy Board proposed the creation of a Royal Australian Naval Volunteer Reserve scheme, with approaches made to yachting and rowing clubs, starting in New South Wales, South Australia, Victoria and Tasmania. Men who were undergoing or liable to compulsory training under the Defence Act (Cwlth) were ineligible for enrolment. For the volunteers, a period of five years of service was proposed with parading twice a month, training occur outside of business hours, entry as an able seaman rating, and officer appointments not based on social or other positions. Requirements later included fourteen days training every alternate year, and 'seven days out of this period should be spent afloat'.

By 1925, following mufti attire on parades, the uniform was determined to be the same as the regular forces, with 'RANVR' replacing 'RANR' on the cap band, and the uniform to be supplied by the government instead of the individual as had been the case in the past. Members, unless former ratings of the Royal Navy or Royal Australian Navy, had to be more than 21 years-of-age.

== World War II actions ==
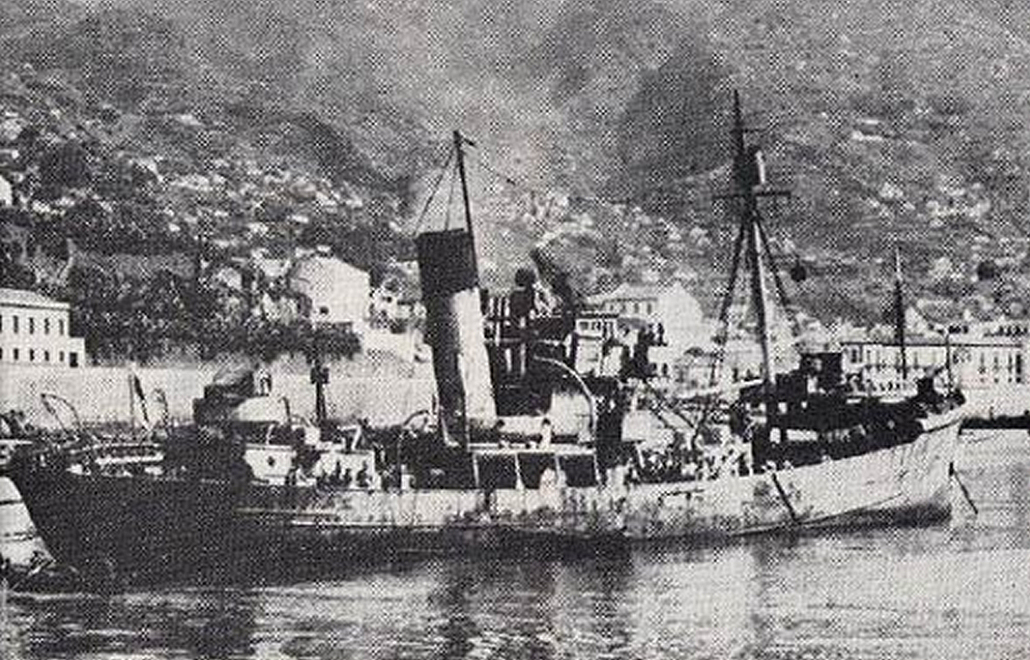
HMS Lady Shirley (ASW trawler)

During World War II, most Australian coastwatchers were commissioned as officers in the RANVR. Some RANVR officers also served in the Royal Navy, and with the Royal Canadian Navy. One officer also served as the Royal Navy liaison officer to the Soviet Navy.

HMS Lady Shirley was a fishing trawler requisitioned by the Royal Navy in 1940 and converted for anti-submarine warfare. It went into service in January 1941 and served with the 31st Anti-Submarine Group based at Gibraltar under the command of Lieutenant Commander Arthur Henry Callaway DSO RANVR, sinking the U-111.

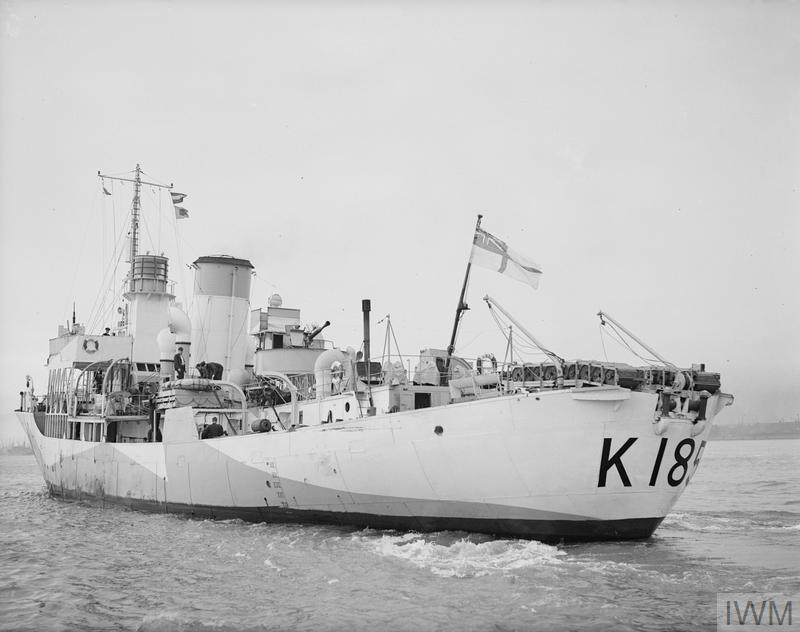
HMS Alisma, 1942

HMS Alisma was a Flower-class corvette of the Royal Navy. She was commanded by Acting Lieutenant Commander Maurice George Rose, RANVR from 2 May 1941 to 1 May 1943, succeeded by Lieutenant George Lanning, RANVR until 11 June 1945. She was part of Escort Group B7, one of seven such British naval groups which served with the Mid-Ocean Escort Force (MOEF). It provided convoy protection in the most dangerous midsection of the North Atlantic route.

In June 1945, the starting contingent of 12 Royal Australian Air Force pilots were transferred to the RANVR, to undergo training and service with the Fleet Air Arm of the Royal Navy.

It was confirmed members could receive promotion in exceptional circumstances if they had the special qualifications. Members demobilising at the end of the war were entitled to a discharge certificate.

== 1946–1973 ==
In August 1948, with just 948 members on Royal Australian Navy's reserve list, the RANVR was reestablished, seeking 30000 former reservists with wartime service rejoin for a four-year term. By December, 1300 former navy members had applied. Youth and men with no naval experience would be sought later. The Women's Royal Australian Naval Reserve was also created. RANVR personnel were different to the Royal Australian Naval Reserve. The former could be called up for hostilities, whereas the latter group could be mobilised at any time. The minimum recruiting age was seventeen years.

With the onset of the Korean War in 1950, those persons unable to join the Royal Australian Naval Reserve due to an inability to perform training or distance were able to be accepted into the RANVR. A submission was also made at this time to have all service payments to members tax-free. Reservists continued to be used in various capacities such as additional staffing for the 1962 Exercise Seascape, part of a South-East Asia Treaty Organisation operation.

The current Royal Australian Naval Reserve was formed in June 1973, from a merger of the RANVR and the RANR (Seagoing), formed in 1921 and 1913 respectively.

== Individual honours ==
Various members of the RANVR received acknowledgement for their service. By May 1944, fifty-six RANVR personnel had received 71 decorations or awards; and by August 1944, RANVR personnel had been included two George Crosses, two DSOs, two OBEs, two MBEs, sixteen DSCs, one Conspicuous Gallantry Medal, two DSMs, and ten George Medals. Due to wartime security, the reasons for the awards were not always released at the time of awarding.

A person's presence in the below list does not suggest their award was more notable than any other award; ranks and existing citations are as of the time of the awarding; and the list is incomplete. Person may be listed for more than one entry. List ranked by 'order of wear'.

Name	Rank	Age	Award	Action/citation	Year awarded
Leonard Verdi Goldsworthy GM	Lieutenant	35	GC	For naval mine clearance. Only one of eight individuals who were awarded both the George Cross and the George Medal. (Also holds DSC.) (Resident of East Perth, WA.)	Sep 1944
George Gosse	Lieutenant	33	GC	For naval mine clearance, clearing the port of Bremen, rendering safe a new type of enemy mine. (Resident of North Adelaide, SA.)	Apr 1946
John Stuart Mould GM	Lieutenant	32	GC	For naval mine clearance, stripping live enemy mines. (Also holds GM.)	Mar 1943
Hugh Randall Syme GM	Lieutenant	40	GC	For naval mine clearance. One of two persons to be awarded a GC, GM and bar. (Also holds GM and bar.) (Resident of Melbourne, Victoria.)	Aug 1943
Sidney Arthur Anderson	Temporary Lieutenant		OBE	For special services, related to bomb disposal work, for an act 'of surpassing coolness and courage', dismantling a land mine in Britain. (Resident of London.)	Apr 1942
Geoffrey John Cliff MBE	Lieutenant		OBE	Replacing an MBE awarded in October 1943. (Resident of Collaroy, NSW.)	Apr 1944
John Charles Rookwood Proud	Commander		OBE	For meritorious service in organising, directing, and planning propaganda work for the Far Eastern Liaison Office from 1942 to the end of the war against Japan. Later made a CBE in the 1958 New Year Honours unrelated to the RANVR. (Resident of Victoria.)	Jan 1946
Geoffrey John Cliff GM	Lieutenant		MBE	For bravery and steadfast devotion to duty. (Resident of Collaroy, NSW.)	Oct 1943
Charles George Croft	Lieutenant		MBE	For bravery and steadfast devotion to duty. Rendered mines safe from Darwin. Died 18 May 1953. (Resident of Hobart, Tasmania.)	Oct 1943
Ronald Alexander Denovan	Lieutenant Commander	39	MBE	For almost twenty years RANVR service, with meritorious service in the Coral Sea and New Guinea waters. Previously mentioned in dispatches. (Resident of Sydney, NSW.)	Jan 1944
Francis Bernard Kingston Drake	Lieutenant (Sp)		MBE	For initiative and devotion to duty under hazardous and arduous conditions. (Resident of Somerset, England.)	Jun 1945
George Hermon Gill	Lieutenant Commander		MBE	Appointed in the King's Birthday Honours 1943. Gill also wrote the two volumes on the Royal Australian Navy in the official history series Australia in the War of 1939–1945. (Resident of Melbourne, Victoria.)	Jun 1943
Edward Leslie Nichols VRD	Lieutenant Commander		MBE	(Melbourne 19 September 1922 – Adelaide 14 January 2017). (Resident of North Adelaide, SA.)	Jan 1971
John Lorimer Nicoll	Temporary Lieutenant		MBE	For bravery in saving life after HMS Bredon was sunk. (Resident of WA.)	May 1943
Lachlan De Salis Nicolson	Lieutenant (Sp)		MBE	For initiative and devotion to duty under hazardous and arduous conditions. (1915–1980) (Resident of Bowen, Queensland.)	Jun 1945
Ernest Edward Ruttle	Lieutenant		MBE	For distinguished service during the European war. Later involved in mine clearance. (Resident of Perth, WA.)	Dec 1945
Cecil Lesley Morris Shepperd DSM	Engineer Lieutenant (ME)	58	MBE	Shepperd had previously earned a DSM in 1943 as a chief engine room artificer (but at that time was not with the RANVR). (Resident of Sydney, NSW.)	Jan 1967
Charles Victor Wood	Lieutenant Commander		MBE	Outstanding zeal and devotion throughout long service. (Resident of NSW.)	Jun 1945
Maxwell Henry Shean DSO	Lieutenant		DSO 1st bar	(Also holds a Bronze Star.)	Jan 1946
Arthur Henry 'Bill' Callaway	Lieutenant Commander	35	DSO	For conspicuous gallantry and bravery in a daring and brilliant action with HMS Lady Shirley against a German U-boat twice her size and more heavily armed. Callaway was believed to be killed in action in December 1941 against another U-boat.	Oct 1941
Ernest Thomas Lees	Sub-Lieutenant		DSO	For daring, resource and devotion to duty while serving in HMT Arab at Namsos, Norway.	Aug 1940
Maxwell Henry Shean	Lieutenant	26	DSO	After crewing a midget submarine HMS X24 and sinking two ships and a floating dock in Bergen, Norway in April 1944.	Jun 1944
Stanley Darling DSC	Lieutenant Commander	38	DSC 2nd bar	For courage, outstanding efficiency and devotion to duty whilst serving in HMS Loch Killin (K391), in a successful engagement with an enemy submarine U-1063 off Start Point, Devon, on 16 April 1945. He received an OBE in June 1960, and retired from the RAN Reserve in 1961. Born on 17 August 1907, Darling died on 18 November 2002 in Sydney. (Resident of Tasmania.)	Aug 1945
Kenneth Robert Hudspeth DSC	Lieutenant	27	DSC 2nd bar	Second bar to the DSC, penetrating D-Day Normandy minefields in pitch darkness, in a midget submarine. He was the first Australian volunteer reservist to win two decorations for submarine service, which arose from Atlantic convoying. (Resident of Hobart, Tasmania.)	Dec 1944
Stanley Darling DSC	Lieutenant Commander	37	DSC 1st bar	For courage, resolution and skill with U-boat operations, sinking U-736. (Resident of Tasmania.)	Nov 1944
Kenneth Robert Hudspeth DSC	Lieutenant	26	DSC 1st bar	Involved with XE-class submarines. (Resident of Hobart, Tasmania.)	Apr 1944
Ronald John Major DSC	Lieutenant Commander		DSC 1st bar	For gallantry, skill and devotion to duty while serving in His Majesty's Australian ships in successful assault operations in Lingayen Gulf, Luzon Island. (Resident of Cottesloe, WA.)	Jun 1950
Frederick Meares Osborne DSC	Sub-Lieutenant	36	DSC 1st bar	For sinking of a German U-boat on 10 April 1945.	Sep 1945
Harry Frederick Wadds DSC	Provisional lieutenant		DSC 1st bar	For bravery and skill in the Mediterranean, damaging an Italian cruiser in the Straits of Messina. (Resident of Sydney, NSW.)	Dec 1943
Frank Sydney Burnet Appleton	Temporary Acting Lieutenant Commander		DSC	For work during Allied invasion of Europe, commanding a division of tank landing craft at Normandy. (Resident of Sydney, NSW.)	Jun 1945
Alan Vincent Atkins	Temporary Sub-Lieutenant	23	DSC	For submarine hunting when on North Atlantic convey operations.	Jun 1944
Charles Throgmorton Ball	Temporary Lieutenant		DSC	For gallantry in the face of the enemy, and for setting an exampleof wholehearted devotion to duty which upheld the high traditions of the Royal Navy. (Resident of Sarina, Queensland.)	Jun 1944
Harold Leon 'Bill' Billman	Lieutenant (Sp)		DSC	'Lieutenant Billman landed on Panaon Island on 20th October, 1944 with the assault forces. He displayed bravery, devotion to duty and exceptional skill over a period of four months in dealing with Japanese mines and unexploded bombs in the clearance operations in the Philippines.' Received a Commander 7th Fleet Commendation in June 1945. (Resident of Shepparton, Victoria.)	Nov 1945
Ian Penn Boucaut	Lieutenant		DSC	For his part in the sinking of a U-boat in October 1940 by HMS Lady Shirley. (Resident of Leederville, WA.)	Nov 1941
Kenneth Melville Brennan	Lieutenant		DSC	For gallantry and distinguished service during the assault on and capture of Termoli, Italy, in the face of heavy opposition from the enemy.	Feb 1944
Kenneth William Tweeddale Bridge	Sub-Lieutenant		DSC	For bravery and enterprise in reconnaissance operations. (Resident of Bellerine, Victoria.)	Feb 1945
Peter Salmon Colclough	Sub-lieutenant	21	DSC	For saving a Malta convey when on HMAS Nestor (G02).	Nov 1941
Thomas Scott Cree	Sub-Lieutenant	26	DSC	For conduct in naval anti-submarine operations in the Mediterranean Sea.	Jan 1941
Stanley Darling	Lieutenant Commander	37	DSC	For his part in anti-U-boat operations in HMS Loch Killin (K391) resulting in the destruction of a U-boat U-333. (Resident of Tasmania.)	Nov 1944
George Manley Dixon	Acting Lieutenant Commander		DSC	Commanding a tank landing ship.	Jan 1945
Richard Edelsten-Pope	Temporary Lieutenant		DSC	For distinguished service and gallantry during the invasion of the South of France.	Mar 1945
Arthur Reginald Evans	Lieutenant		DSC	For bravery and enterprise in reconnaissance operations. (Resident of Medindie, SA.)	Feb 1945
Phillip G. Evatt	Temporary Lieutenant		DSC	For exceptional skill, audacity and judgment whilst serving in one of H.M. Submarines. (Resident of Sydney, NSW.)	Jun 1945
John Ferguson	Lieutenant		DSC	Distinguished service in light coastal craft particularly in safeguarding the passage of troops during the invasion assaults of Normandy. (Resident of Wynnum, Queensland.)	Jan 1945
William L. Fesq	Temporary Lieutenant		DSC	For gallant and distinguished service in light coastal craft in a successful engagement of the enemy. This involved superior forces of enemy trawlers and E-boats around the United Kingdom. (Resident of Strathfield, NSW.)	May 1944
Francis George Fielder	Lieutenant		DSC	On board HMAS Arunta (I30).	May 1945
Leonard Verdi Goldsworthy GC GM	Lieutenant	35	DSC	Naval mine clearance. (Also holds GC and GM.)	Jan 1945
Robert William Sarson Goodman	Temporary Lieutenant		DSC	For courage, skill and devotion to duty whilst serving in H.M.S.A.S. Natal, H.M.C.S. St. Thomas, H.M. Ships Torrington, Wivern and Retalick and Light Coastal Forces, in the destruction of enemy submarines and midget submarines.	Jul 1945
Edwin Joseph Gregg	Lieutenant		DSC	For service in Greece and the Dalmatian Islands. (Resident of Tasmania.)	Nov 1944
James Benison Griffin	Sub-Lieutenant		DSC	HMAS Stuart (D00). He was awarded a CBE on 1 January 1970 for services to the community in New South Wales (and earlier awarded a VRD).	Jan 1941
Ian Antrobus Harris	Temporary Lieutenant		DSC	Dived from his small craft into oil-smeared waters to rescue survivors from a sunk destroyer. (Resident of SA.)	May 1944
Dick Crofton Horton	Lieutenant	29	DSC	For great daring and enterprise. Presented by His Majesty, The King, at Buckingham Palace. (Also holds the Silver Star.) (Resident of England.)	Jul 1944
Kenneth Robert Hudspeth	Lieutenant		DSC	For outstanding courage and devotion. Involved with XE-class submarines. (Resident of Hobart, Tasmania.)	Jan 1944
Henry Arthur Josselyn	Acting Lieutenant	31	DSC	For great daring and enterprise. Coastwatcher. Presented by His Majesty, The King, at Buckingham Palace. (Also holds the Silver Star.) (Resident of England.)	Jul 1944
John Robert Keenan	Acting Lieutenant	29	DSC	For great daring and enterprise. (Resident of Victoria.)	Jul 1944
William Euan Ironside Littlejohn	Lieutenant	23	DSC	For bravery and skill in successful patrol in one of His Majesty's submarines. He was given to be the first Australian to command a submarine. Having served on HMS Thrasher (N37), he then temporarily commanded HMS Vox (P73). Lt Geoffrey J. Gellie was the first RANVR member given permanent command of a submarine in April 1944. Littlejohn's DSC was the 47th DSC to RAN personnel.	Dec 1943
Ronald John Major	Lieutenant	23	DSC	For his part in the dramatic attempt to seize Oran against Vichy France in November 1942. Awarded prior to March 1945. (Resident of Cottesloe, WA.)	May 1943
William Miles Marley	Temporary Lieutenant		DSC	Serving with the light coastal forces in Britain. (Resident of Queensland.)	Jun 1944
Hugh David McDonald	Temporary Lieutenant	32	DSC	For bravery, skill, and devotion to duty in HMS Eskimo (F75) during anti-U-boat operations.	Oct 1944
Ronald McKauge	Acting Temporary Lieutenant Commander	35	DSC	For gallantry in the landing at El Agala. McKauge was later made a Commander of the Order of the British Empire for service to veterans.	Jun 1944
Frederick Meares Osborne	Sub-Lieutenant	31	DSC	For "bravery and devotion to duty" while assisting the evacuation of forces from Norway on the armed trawler St Loman, as a member of the 15th Anti-Submarine Striking Force.	Aug 1940
George Archibald Ramsay	Temporary Lieutenant		DSC	For gallantry, skill, determination and undaunted devotion to duty during the landing of Allied Forces on the coast of Normandy.	Nov 1944
Bruce Aubrey Reeves	Acting Lieutenant		DSC	For courage, determination and great devotion to duty in valuable and hazardous survey operations in the Far East.	Jul 1945
Thomas John Scott	Lieutenant		DSC	Served abroad in light coastal craft of the Royal Navy, receiving the DSC for the courage, resolution and skill he displayed in a number of successful engagements with enemy forces. (Resident of Burwood, Victoria.)	Jan 1945
Andrew Kirkwall Smith	Lieutenant		DSC	For bravery and enterprise in reconnaissance operations. (Resident of Carlton, Victoria.)	Feb 1945
Alexander Nicol Anton Waddell	Acting Lieutenant	30	DSC	For great daring and enterprise. (Resident of Scotland.)	Jul 1944
Harry Frederick Wadds	Provisional lieutenant		DSC	For bravery during a daring attack on Tripoli harbour while serving in the light coastal craft, sinking a submarine. (Resident of Sydney, NSW.)	Sep 1943
Malcolm Hugh Wright	Lieutenant	31	DSC	For great daring and enterprise. (Resident of Bendigo, Victoria.)	Jul 1944
Ian Rhodes	Ordinary seaman		CGM	After HMS Kashmir (F12) was attacked and cut in half, he shot down an enemy plane that was machine-gunning survivors in the water.	Jan 1942
Geoffrey John Cliff GM	Lieutenant		GM 1st bar	Naval mine clearance. (Resident of Collaroy, NSW.)	Nov 1942
Howard Dudley Reid GM	Lieutenant		GM 1st bar	Naval mine clearance. (Resident of Sydney, NSW.)	Jun 1942
Hugh Randall Syme GM	Lieutenant	39	GM 1st bar	Naval mine clearance. (Also holds GC.) (Resident of Melbourne, Victoria.)	Jun 1942
Geoffrey John Cliff	Lieutenant		GM	Naval mine clearance. (Resident of Collaroy, NSW.)	Jun 1942
Leonard Verdi Goldsworthy	Lieutenant	35	GM	Naval mine clearance. (Also holds GC and DSC. Only one of eight individuals who were awarded both the GC and GM.)	Apr 1944
James Henry 'Jim' Kessack	Lieutenant		GM	Naval mine clearance. Posthumous award (d. April 1941). (Resident of Sydney, NSW.)	Jun 1941
John Stuart Mould	Lieutenant	32	GM	Naval mine clearance, including multiple unexploded mines, deep in mud. (Also holds GC.) (Resident of NSW.)	Apr 1942
Howard Dudley Reid	Lieutenant		GM	Naval mine clearance. (Resident of Sydney, NSW.)	Jun 1941
Hugh Randall Syme	Lieutenant	38	GM	Naval mine clearance. Volunteer member of a naval 'suicide squad' 'delousing' unexploded bombs and mines within London. (Also holds GC.) (Resident of Melbourne, Victoria.)	Jun 1941
Keith Swan Upton	Lieutenant		GM	Naval mine clearance. (Resident of Essendon, Victoria.)	Jun 1942
Patrick Joseph Brady	Ordinary seaman		DSM	For his work during the raid on Saint Nazaire.	May 1942
Hugh Somerville Cassidy	Ordinary seaman		DSM	(Resident of Brisbane, Queensland.)	Dec 1942
Julius Bell MacNicol	Able seaman	37	DSM	For great daring and enterprise. (Resident of Rabaul, New Guinea.)	Jul 1944
Albert Malkin Anderson	Sub-Lieutenant		MiD	For bravery and enterprise in reconnaissance operations. (Resident of Sydney, NSW.)	Feb 1945
Alan Charles Baume VD	Acting Lieutenant Commander		MiD	HMAS Platypus (1917).	Oct 1945
Harold Leon 'Bill' Billman	Lieutenant (Sp)		MiD	For courage, skill and undaunted devotion to duty in exceptionally hazardous operations, in the Nassau Bay area in August 1944 for diligent clearing unexploded ordnance from the Leyte and Manila Bay areas. (Resident of Shepparton, Victoria.)	Jun 1945
John Francis Britton	Lieutenant		MiD	Light coastal craft during the invasion of Normandy. (Resident of Penshurst, NSW.)	Nov 1944
Norman Frederick Brooker	Lieutenant		MiD	For outstanding courage, skill and initiative while serving in H. M. Australian Ships Hobart, Shropshire, Swan, Dubbo, Colac, and Deloraine, and Light Coastal Forces, over a period of seven months, in operations in the Far East which covered the bombardments of Tarakan, Wewak, Lubuan and Balikpapan and the attack on Lingayen Gulf, Aitape and Wewak.	Nov 1945
Douglas John Browne	Lieutenant		MiD	For gallant leadership and devotion to duty under heavy and continual fire from the enemy during the landing on the Italian mainland of Sicily.	Feb 1944
Stewart Linton Browne	Acting Temporary Lieutenant Commander	38	MiD	For gallantry, skill, determination and undaunted devotion to duty during the landing of Allied forces on the coast of Normandy. (Resident of Queensland.)	Dec 1944
Alan Richard Callaway	Lieutenant		MiD	On board HMS Shropshire.	May 1945
Peter Salmon Colclough DSC	Sub-Lieutenant		MiD	For skill and enterprise in action against enemy submarines, with HMAS Nestor (G02).	Feb 1942
Malcolm Gilbert Cowie	Lieutenant		MiD	Courage and skill during anti-U-boat operations while serving in HMS Cooke (K471). (Resident of Sale, Victoria.)	Dec 1944
Thomas Scott Cree	Probationary Sub-Lieutenant		MiD	HMAS Stuart (D00).	Sep 1940
Ronald Alexander Denovan MBE VD	Lieutenant Commander		MiD	(Resident of Sydney, NSW.)	Oct 1945
Clive Barker Dillon	Lieutenant		MiD	(Resident of Sydney, NSW.)	Jun 1945
William Fairlie Fergusson	Lieutenant		MiD	Good service in fire-fighting when a Sherman tank caught fire. On loan service with the Royal Navy since early 1941. (Resident of Bellerive, Tasmania.)	Jan 1945
Leonard Verdi Goldsworthy GM	Lieutenant	35	MiD		Aug 1944
Edwin Joseph Gregg	Temporary Lieutenant		MiD	Part of a beachhead landing at Anzio, Italy. (Resident of Tasmania.)	Nov 1944
Robert Kenley Hart	Acting Temporary Lieutenant Commander		MiD	For gallantry, skill, determination and undaunted devotion to duty during the landing of Allied forces on the coast of Normandy. Commanded a fleet mine sweeper. (Resident of Adelaide, SA.)	Dec 1944
Frederick Sutton Holt	Lieutenant		MiD	For skill, determination and bravery in anti-U-boat operations whilst serving with H.M. Ships Troubridge, Terpsichore and Vetch.	Mar 1945
Eric Mervyn Howitt	Lieutenant		MiD	For outstanding courage, skill and initiative while serving in H. M. Australian Ships Hobart, Shropshire, Swan, Dubbo, Colac, and Deloraine, and Light Coastal Forces, over a period of seven months, in operations in the Far East which covered the bombardments of Tarakan, Wewak, Lubuan and Balikpapan and the attack on Lingayen Gulf, Aitape and Wewak.	Nov 1945
Reginald McKenzie Jeffrey	Lieutenant		MiD	On HMS Asphodel.	Jan 1942
Trevor Owen Kolts	Lieutenant		MiD	For zeal, patience and cheerfulness in dangerous waters and setting an example of that wholehearted devotion to duty without which the high tradition of the Royal Navy could not have been upheld. HMS Folkestone (L22). (Resident of Potts Point, NSW.)	Jun 1943
Robert Evans Lang	Sub-Lieutenant		MiD	For gallantry, skill, and leadership in engagement with enemy E-boats while serving with light coastal forces in England.	Apr 1945
Ronald John Major DSC	Lieutenant		MiD	Already with a DSC. (Resident of Cottesloe, WA.)	Mar 1945
Ralph Gerald Murrell	Temporary Lieutenant		MiD	For work during Allied invasion of Europe, commanding a division of tank landing craft at Normandy.	Jun 1945
Kenneth Baillieu Myer	Temporary lieutenant		MiD		Nov 1944
James Bedford Jeffries Osborne	Lieutenant		MiD	On board HMS Shropshire.	May 1945
Henry Somerville Paterson	Temporary Lieutenant		MiD	For gallantry, skill, determination and undaunted devotion to duty during the landing of Allied Forces on the coast of Normandy.	Dec 1944
Warwick Harper Pennington	Lieutenant		MiD	For outstanding courage, skill and initiative while serving in H. M. Australian Ships Hobart, Shropshire, Swan, Dubbo, Colac, and Deloraine, and Light Coastal Forces, over a period of seven months, in operations in the Far East which covered the bombardments of Tarakan, Wewak, Lubuan and Balikpapan and the attack on Lingayen Gulf, Aitape and Wewak.	Nov 1945
Maurice George Rose	Lieutenant Commander		MiD	For zeal, patience and cheerfulness in dangerous waters and setting an example of that wholehearted devotion to duty without which the high tradition of the Royal Navy could not have been upheld. HMS Alisma (K185). (Resident of Longueville, NSW.)	Jun 1943
Walter Longdon Sadgrove	Lieutenant		MiD	Outstanding zeal, patience and cheerfulness. (Resident of Brisbane, Queensland.)	Jan 1941
Walter Longdon Sadgrove	Lieutenant		MiD	Good services in action against submarines. Died 11 March 1942 near Iceland on HMS Stella Capella when the trawler was sunk by German submarine U-701. (Resident of Brisbane, Queensland.)	Jan 1942
Thomas Oliver Sexton	Lieutenant		MiD	For bravery and enterprise in reconnaissance operations. (Resident of Sydney, NSW.)	Feb 1945
Frederick Theophilus Sherbourne	Sub-Lieutenant (A)		MiD	For distinguished service and gallantry during the invasion of the South of France.	Mar 1945
Douglas Alfred Peter Smith	Lieutenant		MiD	For outstanding courage, skill and initiative while serving in H. M. Australian Ships Hobart, Shropshire, Swan, Dubbo, Colac, and Deloraine, and Light Coastal Forces, over a period of seven months, in operations in the Far East which covered the bombardments of Tarakan, Wewak, Lubuan and Balikpapan and the attack on Lingayen Gulf, Aitape and Wewak.	Nov 1945
Clive Ernest Tayler	Temporary Lieutenant		MiD	For gallantry, tenacity and undaunted devotion to duty in patrols in the Aegean area throughout one of the most dangerous periods of war in the Mediterranean. (Resident of Caulfield, Victoria.)	Jun 1945
Henry William Traynor	Temporary Acting Lieutenant Commander (S)		MiD	For good services whilst attached to the Phillipine [sic] Sea Frontier in the repatriation of British Prisoners of War from the Far East.	Mar 1946
Aldred Ernest Weston	Lieutenant		MiD	Gallantry, skill, determination and devotion. Relating to duty during the landing of Allied forces on the coast of Normandy.	Dec 1944
Roy Forrest Williams	Sub-Lieutenant		MiD	(Resident of Queensland.)	Jan 1945
William Alexander Wood	Lieutenant		MiD	For work during Allied invasion of Europe, commanding a division of tank landing craft at Normandy. (Resident of Sydney, NSW.)	Jun 1945
George Raymond Worledge	Lieutenant		MiD	Outstanding zeal, patience and cheerfulness.	Jan 1942
Frank Sydney Burnet Appleton	Lieutenant Commander		VRD	(Resident of Sydney, NSW.)	
A. J. Bush	Lieutenant Commander (SP)		VRD		Apr 1961
Charles George Croft	Lieutenant Commander		VRD	(Resident of Hobart, Tasmania.)	1953
D. Drake	Lieutenant Commander		VRD		Apr 1961
Ronald McKauge DSC	Lieutenant Commander	52	VRD		Apr 1961
O. M. Moriarty	Lieutenant Commander		VRD		Apr 1961
Stanley George Vincent Bell	Sub-Lieutenant		Legion of Merit (USA)	For exceptionally meritorious conduct in the performance of outstanding services to the Government of the United States of America, while serving as liaison officer on the staff of the Commanding General of an island in the Pacific war area. Presented the Legion of Merit, Degree of Legionnaire in November 1945.	1945
Dick Crofton Horton	Lieutenant		Silver Star (USA)	For service with the US First Marine Raider Battalion in the landings at Tulagi, Solomon Islands, in August 1942. (Resident of England.)	Sep 1943
Henry Arthur Josselyn	Lieutenant		Silver Star (USA)	For service with the US First Marine Raider Battalion in the landings at Tulagi, Solomon Islands, in August 1942. (Resident of England.)	Sep 1943
Allan Campbell	Lieutenant		Bronze Star (USA)	(Resident of Sydney, NSW.)	1948
Maxwell Henry Shean	Lieutenant		Bronze Star (USA)	For meritorious achievement as the commanding officer of the midget submarine HMS XE4 Exciter as part of Operation Sabre severing underwater telecommunication cables. Presented in March 1947.	1947
Lionel Arthur Walker	Lieutenant		Bronze Star (USA)	For meritorious achievement in the south-west Pacific area from May 1943 to September 1944 as a coastwatcher. Presented in October 1948. (Resident of Sydney, NSW.)	1948
David Llewellyn Davis	Lieutenant		Cross of Merit (Ned)	For outstanding work for Netherlands forces and civilians in very trying circumstances. Lieutenant Davis, as deputy Naval Officer in charge of Broome, Port Hedland district during an enemy attack on Netherlands navy planes at Broome on March 3, 1942, showed conspicuous organising ability, handled transport in a masterly manner and rendered great assistance to those aboard this plane.	Jul 1944
