= George Gosse =

Australian recipient of the George Cross

Lieutenant Commander George Gosse GC
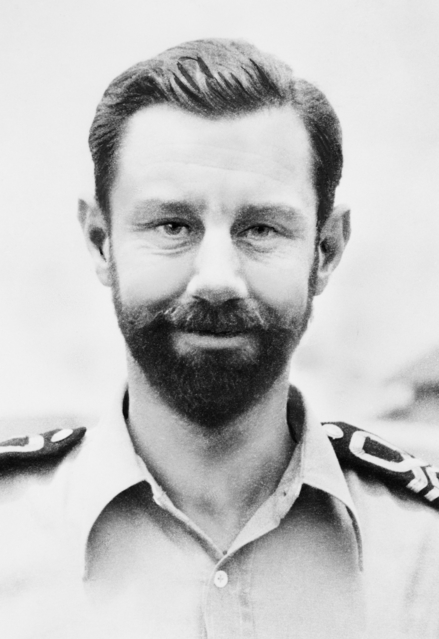
- Lieutenant George Gosse c. 1945
- Born: 16 February 1912; Harvey, Western Australia
- Died: 31 December 1964 (aged 52); Maslin Beach, South Australia
- Military career
- Allegiance: Australia
- Branch: Royal Australian Navy
- Service years: 1926–1933; 1940–1958
- Rank: Lieutenant commander
- Conflicts: Second World War; South-East Asian theatre; European theatre
- Awards: George Cross

Lieutenant Commander George Gosse, GC (16 February 1912 – 31 December 1964) was an Australian recipient of the George Cross, the highest award for extraordinary acts of gallantry away from the field of battle that could be awarded to a member of the Australian armed forces at the time. Gosse served in the Royal Australian Navy between 1926 and 1933, reaching the rank of sub-lieutenant and receiving training and experience with the British Royal Navy.

In 1940, he joined the Royal Australian Naval Volunteer Reserve (RANVR) for service in World War II. Quickly sent back to the United Kingdom, he served on several shore establishments before being sent to British India as a naval mine clearance specialist. He returned to the UK in late 1944, and in April 1945 he was given command of a naval party responsible for mine clearance in the recently captured Bremen Harbour in Germany. He displayed exceptional courage in defusing three mines under very difficult conditions between 8 and 19 May 1945, which resulted in him being awarded the George Cross.

Gosse continued to serve in the RANVR after the war, reaching the rank of lieutenant commander before retiring in 1958, and died of a heart condition in 1964. His medal set is displayed in the Hall of Valour at the Australian War Memorial.

== Early life and career ==
George Gosse was born on 16 February 1912 at Harvey, Western Australia, the elder child of William Hay Gosse, a farmer, and his wife Muriel née Davidson. He was a grandson of the explorer William Gosse and a nephew of the businessman Sir James Hay Gosse. His father had served in the 2nd South Australian Mounted Rifles in the Second Boer War in South Africa, and joined the British Army as an artillery officer in World War I. He was awarded the Military Cross for gallantry and was killed in action in 1918. Muriel died in 1920; George and his younger sister were then cared for by their paternal grandmother.

Gosse was schooled at St Peter's College, Adelaide, South Australia, from 1920 to 1925, and entered the Royal Australian Naval College (RAN College) at Jervis Bay in 1926, aged 13. According to a family member he was "so like his father, gay, feckless, fearless and gregarious". While at the RAN College he excelled at field hockey, and upon graduation in 1930 received the prize for engineering theory. Beginning in January 1930 he served aboard both Australian County-class heavy cruisers, first HMAS Australia then HMAS Canberra. He was promoted to midshipman in May of that year. In July 1931, he sailed for the United Kingdom for further training with the British Royal Navy.

His first assignment was to the Mediterranean Fleet, aboard the Revenge-class super-dreadnought battleship HMS Ramillies. He also attended an air course on the Courageous-class aircraft carrier HMS Glorious, and was familiarised with the employment of destroyers during a stint aboard HMS Worcester. In September 1932 he was promoted to acting sub-lieutenant, and entered the Royal Naval College, Greenwich. The social and sporting temptations of London beckoned, and Gosse's studies suffered. After he failed the examination for lieutenant, he was returned to Australia and his naval career ended on 30 October 1933. Gosse then worked at odd jobs for a few years, and on 1 October 1938 he married Diana Skottowe at his old school chapel. The couple had two daughters.

== World War II ==
On 1 September 1939, the day World War II began, Gosse attempted to rejoin the RAN, but was rebuffed. Gosse managed to enlist as an ordinary seaman in the Royal Australian Naval Volunteer Reserve on 21 October 1940. He initially underwent training at the shore establishments HMAS Torrens and HMAS Cerberus, before sailing for the UK in December. After serving at the shore establishment HMS Collingwood, in April 1941 he was commissioned as a sub-lieutenant while posted to the shore establishment HMS King Alfred. He next served at the shore establishment HMS President, then in December of that year he was transferred to the Royal Indian Navy shore establishment HMIS Hooghly in Calcutta, British India, as a naval mine disposal officer. In February 1942 he was promoted to provisional lieutenant. In August he was transferred to the shore establishment HMS Lanka. This was followed by a posting to the shore establishment HMS Braganza in Bombay in October 1942. Although his 1940 annual report had described him as "below average, for whom it was doubtful a niche could be found", two years later his report indicated that he was reliable and keen, and displayed ingenuity. When faced with difficulties, he was always cheerful, and was "a daring character" who was very interested in mines.

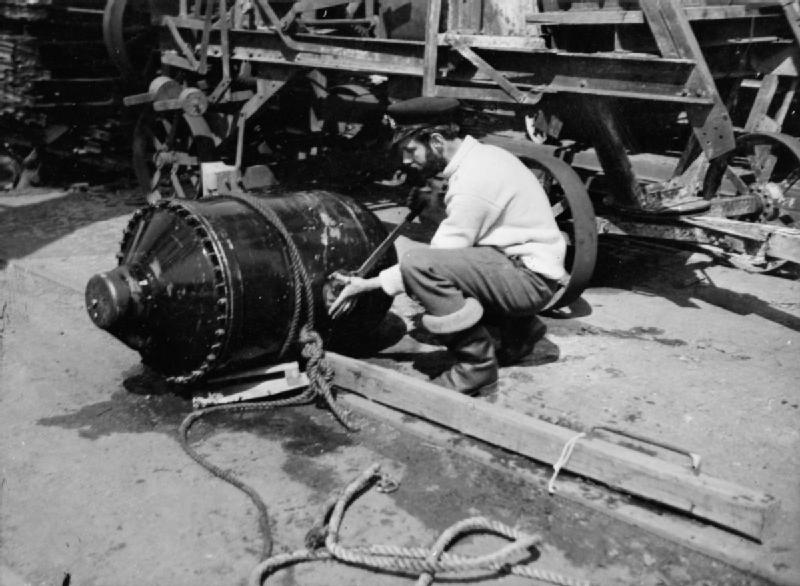
George Gosse defuses a German mine at Bremen.

Transferred back to the UK in November 1944, Gosse was posted to the shore establishment HMS Vernon at Brixham, Devon, which was the European port clearance diving base for the Royal Navy. Clearance diving teams were responsible for removing naval mines from British waters, and from the waters of captured ports on the European mainland. He brought a Japanese mine back with him to the UK, as he considered it would be of use at HMS Vernon. According to his entry in the Australian Dictionary of Biography, he was a bit of a "law unto himself" in this period, but was fascinated with mechanical devices and exhibited inventiveness. He qualified as a shallow-water diver in January 1945.

Following the capture of Bremen, Germany, in April, Gosse led Naval Party 1571 to the port to clear mines laid by the retreating Germans in the Überseehafen. Prior to being sent forward to Bremen, Gosse had interrogated a German prisoner of war (POW) who had been involved in the demolition of the Überseehafen and its facilities who described a mine known as an "Oyster", which was "impossible to sweep for and could never be rendered safe". After arriving in Bremen, Gosse risked his life many times in defusing mines. When his divers reported a sighting of what appeared to be a new form of mine, on 8 May Gosse dived himself and verified that it was a "D-type mine with additional fittings", the "Oyster" mine described by the German POW. This mine was pressure-operated, and its detonation train included magnetic and acoustic elements. About 18:00 the next day, Gosse examined the mine by touch, as the visibility was so poor that his waterproof torch was of no use. In order to maintain his depth, he had to tether himself to the mine marker buoy rope. Using tools he had improvised, Gosse interrupted the detonation train by removing the primer release and the primer, which had to be extracted from about 18 inches (460 mm) down a 2-inch (51 mm) wide tube. Having made the mine safe, Gosse was releasing his tether when there was a small explosion. Later examination of the mine showed that water had entered the primer tube and actuated a water pressure trigger set to fire the detonator if the mine was raised. Gosse personally defused two more "Oyster" mines at Bremen between 9 and 19 May, and in both cases, the detonator fired before the mine reached the surface. Another officer from Naval Party 1571 said later that "if Gosse hadn't found an answer to the ["Oyster"], Bremen Harbour would have been unusable".

He was promoted to acting lieutenant commander on 30 September 1945 and was demobilised on 20 March 1946. For his service in World War II, Gosse was awarded the 1939–1945 Star, the Burma Star, the France and Germany Star, the Defence Medal, the War Medal 1939–1945, and the Australia Service Medal 1939–1945.

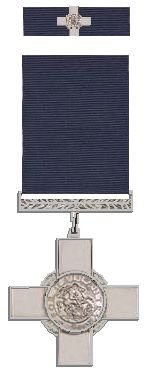
The George Cross

On 26 April 1946, Gosse's award of the George Cross (GC) was promulgated in The London Gazette. The citation read:

On the 8th May, 1945, divers searching Ubersee Hafen reported the presence of a mine which from their description appeared to be an entirely new type. Lieutenant Gosse immediately dived and verified the fact that it was a G.D. pressure type which was commonly known as "Oyster". As it was very necessary that this type of mine should be recovered intact, it was decided to attempt to render safe the mine underwater and on the following day, May 9th, Lieutenant Gosse dived on it again. Using improvised tools he eventually succeeded in removing the primer, which was followed by a loud metallic crash. The mine was eventually lifted on the quayside when it was found that the detonator had fired immediately [after] the primer had been removed. During the subsequent ten days Lieutenant Gosse rendered safe two similar types of mines which were lying in close proximity to shipping and in each instance the detonator fired before the mine reached the surface.

This form of operation called for an exceptionally high standard of personal courage and also a high degree of skill. The conditions were always arduous and were combined with the presence of known mines in the docks and with all forms of underwater obstruction—human corpses—which together with lack of visibility produced a set of conditions which would deter the boldest.

This officer displayed courage and zeal far in excess of the usual course of duty and contributed greatly to the success of a most difficult and important operation.

The George Cross was the highest award for extraordinary acts of gallantry away from the field of battle that could be awarded to a member of the Australian armed forces at the time. Three days after his GC was promulgated, Gosse was visited at home by a journalist from The Advertiser daily newspaper and was surprised to learn he was to receive an award for doing something he enjoyed so much. He joked, "George Gosse, George Cross. Sounds like a test of sobriety".

== Later life ==
Gosse was invested with his George Cross in Adelaide on 3 June 1948 by the Governor of South Australia, Lieutenant General Sir Willoughby Norrie. He continued to serve in the RANVR and was substantively promoted to lieutenant commander on 30 June 1955 before retiring in 1958. He remained an inventive designer, creating many useful domestic gadgets and fittings, but his interest waned once a challenge had been met. According to his entry in the Australian Dictionary of Biography, his work was mostly "unspectacular". He was president of the Sporting Car Club of South Australia from 1946 to 1948.

During 1950, Gosse was part of an Australian armed forces recruiting campaign throughout South Australia, before collapsing from nervous strain at a rally in Renmark. In 1953 he was part of the contingent sent to the UK for the coronation of Queen Elizabeth II, and was awarded the Queen Elizabeth II Coronation Medal. In 1964, he travelled to the UK for a reunion and joined the Victoria Cross and George Cross Association. Gosse died of a coronary occlusion at Maslin Beach on 31 December 1964, and was cremated. The Victoria Cross recipient Brigadier Sir John George Smyth wrote that Gosse "always lived right on top of the world, as though every day was his last". He is commemorated on the Returned and Services League Walls at the Centennial Park Cemetery in Pasadena, South Australia.

His medal set is displayed in the Hall of Valour at the Australian War Memorial. A ward at the former Repatriation General Hospital, Hollywood, in Western Australia (now Hollywood Private Hospital) has been named in his honour.
