= John Mould =

Australian naval officer (1910–1957)

John Mould GC GM
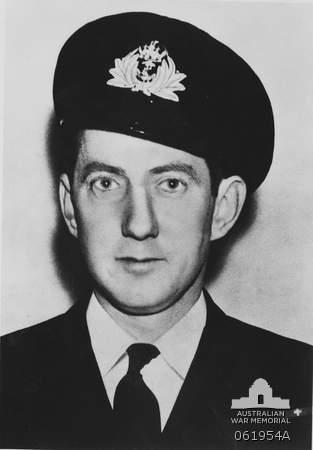
- Mould in 1944
- Born: 21 March 1910; Gosforth, England
- Died: 9 August 1957 (aged 47); Sydney, Australia
- Military career
- Allegiance: Australia
- Branch: Second Australian Imperial Force; Royal Australian Naval Volunteer Reserve
- Service years: 1940–1945
- Rank: Lieutenant Commander
- Conflicts: Second World War
- Awards: George Cross; George Medal; King's Commendation for Brave Conduct
- Other work: Chief architect to the Housing Commission of New South Wales

John Stuart Mould, GC, GM (21 March 1910 – 9 August 1957), was an Australian naval officer, bomb disposal operative and Australian recipient of the George Cross.

== Early life and war service ==
He was born in Gosforth, Northumberland, and emigrated with his family to Australia in childhood. He was appointed a sub-lieutenant in the Royal Australian Naval Volunteer Reserve (RANVR) on 1 September 1940. He sailed for the UK on the Strathmore on 14 September 1940. After training at HMS King Alfred (RNVR training establishment at Hove in Sussex), he joined the Rendering Mines Safe section on 14 December 1940 attached to HMS President for his initial introduction to his future duties. In March 1941 he was posted to HMS Vernon for duties and further training in mine disposal and was praised for "outstanding work on dock clearance operations and those resulting in the stripping of the early German mine Type G". He received a King's Commendation for Brave Conduct in June 1941 and was awarded the George Medal in April 1942.

He recovered, defused and investigated the first example of a German moored magnetic mine and was awarded the George Cross in November 1942 for "great gallantry and devotion to duty". He later worked with Doctor J. B. S. Haldane on developing a diving suit with an integrated air system as air bubbles from the then standard diving suits could "set" German acoustic or acoustic/magnetic triggered mines.

His appointment was terminated on 26 November 1945 when he was acting lieutenant commander attached to HMS Lanka and the staff of the Commander in Chief East Indies. He was terminated in the UK as he was to take up a position on the Allied Control Commission in Germany as an architect. He returned to Australia in 1948.

== Post-war and later life ==
After the war he was appointed chief architect to the Housing Commission of New South Wales in 1950.

In 1953 he attended the coronation of Queen Elizabeth II and was appointed acting lieutenant commander RANVR on 16 February 1953 with his appointment terminated on 15 August 1953. He died on 9 August 1957 in Royal North Shore Hospital due to peritonitis. He was cremated at the Northern Suburbs Crematorium, Lane Cove on 12 August and his ashes interred in the Ex-Service Personnel Wall.

The story of his wartime service was told in Softly Tread The Brave – A triumph over terror, devilry, and death by mine disposal officers John Stuart Mould, GC, GM and Hugh Randal Syme, GC, GM and Bar, and Seventeen Seconds – The gripping true story of the men who dismantled live Nazi bombs in England during World War II, both by Ivan Southall. There is a residential street and a park, containing a memorial, named in his honour in Lalor Park, New South Wales.
