= HMAS Dubbo (J251) =

1942 Bathurst-class corvette

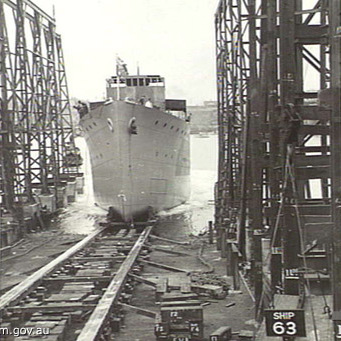
- HMAS Dubbo being launched

History

Australia
- Builder: Mort's Dock & Engineering Company
- Laid down: 13 October 1941
- Launched: 7 March 1942
- Commissioned: 31 July 1942
- Decommissioned: 7 February 1947
- Honours and awards: Battle honours: Pacific 1942–45
- Fate: Sold for scrap in 1958
- Badge

General characteristics
- Class & type: Bathurst-class corvette
- Displacement: 650 tons (standard), 1,025 tons (full war load)
- Length: 186 ft (57 m)
- Beam: 31 ft (9.4 m)
- Draught: 8.5 ft (2.6 m)
- Propulsion: triple expansion engine, 2 shafts
- Speed: 15 knots (28 km/h; 17 mph) at 1,750 hp
- Complement: 85
- Armament: 1 × 4 inch Mk XIX gun, 3 × Oerlikon 20 mm cannons, Machine guns, Depth charges chutes and throwers

HMAS Dubbo (J251/M251), named for the city of Dubbo, was one of 60 Bathurst-class corvettes constructed during World War II, and one of 36 initially manned and commissioned solely by the Royal Australian Navy (RAN).

== Design and construction ==
In 1938, the Australian Commonwealth Naval Board (ACNB) identified the need for a general purpose 'local defence vessel' capable of both anti-submarine and mine-warfare duties, while easy to construct and operate. The vessel was initially envisaged as having a displacement of approximately 500 tons, a speed of at least 10 knots (19 km/h; 12 mph), and a range of 2,000 nautical miles (3,700 km; 2,300 mi) The opportunity to build a prototype in the place of a cancelled Bar-class boom defence vessel saw the proposed design increased to a 680-ton vessel, with a 15.5 knots (28.7 km/h; 17.8 mph) top speed, and a range of 2,850 nautical miles (5,280 km; 3,280 mi), armed with a 4-inch gun, equipped with asdic, and able to fitted with either depth charges or minesweeping equipment depending on the planned operations: although closer in size to a sloop than a local defence vessel, the resulting increased capabilities were accepted due to advantages over British-designed mine warfare and anti-submarine vessels. Construction of the prototype HMAS Kangaroo did not go ahead, but the plans were retained. The need for locally built 'all-rounder' vessels at the start of World War II saw the "Australian Minesweepers" (designated as such to hide their anti-submarine capability, but popularly referred to as "corvettes") approved in September 1939, with 60 constructed during the course of the war: 36 (including Dubbo) ordered by the RAN, 20 ordered by the British Admiralty but manned and commissioned as RAN vessels, and 4 for the Royal Indian Navy.

Dubbo was laid down by Mort's Dock & Engineering Company at Balmain, New South Wales on 13 October 1941. She was launched on 7 March 1942 by Mrs. E. B. Scrisier, Mayoress of Dubbo, and was commissioned into the RAN on 31 July 1942.

== Operational history ==
=== World War II ===
From 1942 until March 1945, Dubbo was assigned to convoy escort anti-submarine duties off the western Australian coast.

In March 1945, Dubbo sailed to Port Moresby, where she spent the rest of World War II around New Guinea and the Solomon Islands, actively supporting Australian land forces. Dubbo fired her first hostile shots on 25 April 1945, against a Japanese position on Muschu Island. This was the first of several bombardments performed by the ship against Japanese positions during the war. Dubbo was undamaged during all of these, and returned to Brisbane in May 1945.

The corvette received one battle honour for her wartime service: "Pacific 1942–45".

=== Post-war ===
In August 1945, Dubbo returned to the Solomon Islands, where she was part of minesweeping operations. She returned for refits in October 1945, and in January 1946 performed minesweeping duties off the Australian coast.

== Decommissioning and fate ==
Dubbo was paid off into reserve on 7 February 1957, and was sold for scrap to Mitsubishi Shoji Kaisha of Tokyo on 20 February 1958. In June 1958, Dubbo and the repair ship HMAS Platypus left Sydney under tow.
