= Leon Goldsworthy =

Australian naval officer, George Cross recipient (1909–1994)

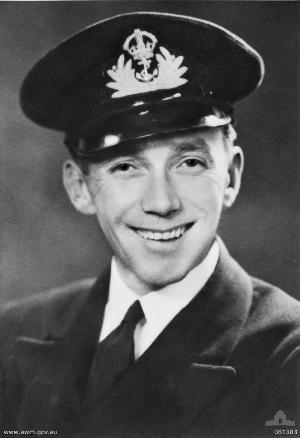
- Lieutenant Commander L. V. Goldsworthy
- Born: 19 January 1909; Broken Hill, New South Wales
- Died: 7 August 1994 (aged 85); Perth, Western Australia
- Military career
- Allegiance: Australia
- Branch: Royal Australian Naval Volunteer Reserve
- Service years: 1941–1946
- Rank: Lieutenant commander
- Nickname: "Goldie"
- Conflicts: Second World War; Operation Overlord; South West Pacific Theatre; Philippines Campaign; Borneo Campaign
- Awards: George Cross; Distinguished Service Cross; George Medal; Mentioned in Despatches
- Other work: Vice-chairman of the Victoria Cross and George Cross Association

Leonard Verdi Goldsworthy, GC, DSC, GM (19 January 1909 – 7 August 1994), known as Leon Goldsworthy, was a distinguished Australian bomb and mine specialist in the Second World War and a recipient of the George Cross, the highest gallantry award for actions which are "not in the face of the enemy" that can be awarded to people of British or Commonwealth nations. He was awarded the GC for defusing four German ground mines, three magnetic mines and one acoustic mine under harrowing circumstances over a period of ten months.

By the end of the war, Goldsworthy had achieved the rank of lieutenant commander and was Australia's most highly decorated naval officer. He returned to his home in Perth, Western Australia and became involved in an electrical sign business.

== Early life ==
Goldsworthy was born on 19 January 1909 at Broken Hill, New South Wales, the son of Alfred Goldsworthy and Eva Jane Goldsworthy (née Riggs). Growing up he was a keen amateur wrestler and gymnast. He was educated at Kapunda High School, South Australia, and later went on to the Adelaide School of Mines before attending the University of Adelaide, where he worked as a technician in the Physics Department. After graduating, he moved to Western Australia and went into the electrical sign business. On 4 November 1939, Goldsworthy married Maud E. Rutherford; the pair later had a daughter, Pamela.

== Second World War ==
Goldsworthy was initially rejected by the Royal Australian Navy due to his small stature, but he reapplied and was accepted as a probationary sub lieutenant in the Royal Australian Naval Volunteer Reserve on 24 March 1941. Two months later he arrived in England to complete his training.

Completing his basic training, Goldsworthy volunteered for the Rendering Mines Safe Section on HMS Vernon. He quickly proved himself as a skilled officer who was able to use his pre-war training in electricity and physics to great effect. He was often required to defuse mines underwater wearing a bulky diving suit that made the slow, steady movements required in this work very difficult. During this period, he was tasked with disposing of German acoustic mines in a number of British harbours.

On 13 August 1943, Goldsworthy defused a German mine in the water off Sheerness using a special diving suit which he and a colleague had helped to develop. On 17 September, in conjunction with another Australian, Lieutenant Commander Geoffrey Cliff, he removed a two-year-old mine from the Coal Barge Wharf at Southampton. A very similar operation was carried out in the River Thames at Tate & Lyle's Wharf, Silvertown, London, on 7 October. For the later two actions, Goldsworthy was awarded the George Medal which was published in a supplement to the London Gazette on 14 April 1944, before receiving a Mention in Despatches in August of the same year.

He then engaged in a series of recoveries between 12 June 1943 and 10 April 1944, during which time he defused four German ground mines, three magnetic mines and one acoustic mine. During the defusal of the acoustic mine, which had lain in the water off Milford Haven Wales for two and a half years, Goldsworthy struck his head on the foot of a ladder while underwater and injured his back while trying to get clear. He, nonetheless, had still managed to extract the fuse and primer. He was awarded the George Cross in September 1944 for his work in recovering and defusing mines during this period; he was also promoted to lieutenant commander.

Before the Allied invasion of France, Goldsworthy was involved in the selection and training of men for port clearance. He was awarded the Distinguished Service Cross in January 1945 for his bravery and leadership in clearing Cherbourg Harbour, which was needed urgently to supply Allied troops advancing across France. On one occasion he disarmed a new German 'K' type mine in 15 metres of water, whilst under shellfire.

After his work in France, Goldsworthy was posted to the South West Pacific Theatre for service with the United States Navy's Mobile Explosive Investigation Unit. This involved work on Japanese mines and booby-traps during the invasion of the Philippines, and later in connection with the landings in the Borneo area; he was among the first to enter and search the caves in Correigidor.

By the time the war ended, Goldsworthy held the rank of lieutenant commander and was Australia's most highly decorated naval officer, having rendered more than 300 mines safe. He received his George Cross from King George VI at Buckingham Palace on 26 February 1946, and was discharged on 24 May.

== Later life ==
Goldsworthy returned to Perth upon demobilisation, and became the Production Manager of Neon Signs (W.A.) Pty Ltd, Perth in 1963. After his wife's death, he remarried Georgette Johnston in 1968, and in 1991 he became Vice-Chairman (overseas) of the Victoria Cross and George Cross Association. Leon Goldsworthy died in Perth, Western Australia on 7 August 1994; he was one of only eight individuals who were awarded both the George Cross and the George Medal. The Leon Goldsworthy ward at Hollywood Private Hospital has been named in his honour.
