= Hugh Syme (GC) =

Australian naval officer, George Cross recipient (1903–1965)

Hugh Randall Syme
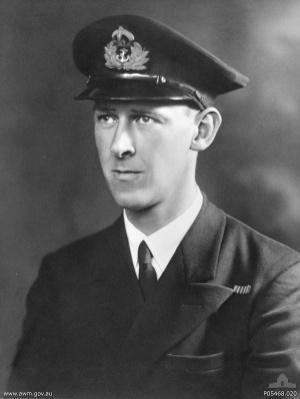
- Studio portrait of H. R. Syme c.1941
- Born: 20 February 1903; Kew, Victoria
- Died: 7 November 1965 (aged 62); Richmond, Victoria
- Military career
- Allegiance: Australia
- Branch: Royal Australian Naval Volunteer Reserve
- Service years: 1940–44
- Rank: Lieutenant
- Conflicts: Second World War
- Awards: George Cross; George Medal & Bar
- Other work: Newspaper and media proprietor

Hugh Randall Syme, GC, GM & Bar (20 February 1903 – 7 November 1965) was an Australian naval officer, bomb disposal operative, and newspaper proprietor. He was awarded the George Cross for his actions in defusing unexploded bombs and landmines during the Second World War. Syme is one of only two people to be awarded the George Cross, George Medal, and Bar, the other being John Bridge.

== Early life ==
He was born in the Melbourne suburb of Kew, and educated at Scotch College and the University of Melbourne. His father, John Herbert Syme was called to the Bar, but instead managed the accounts of the city newspaper The Age which his father David Syme owned. Hugh Syme himself worked on the paper for a time before the outbreak of war.

== Second World War ==
He was a keen amateur yachtsman and part-owner of an 82-foot (25 m) yacht, and joined the Royal Australian Naval Volunteer Reserve on the outbreak of war. He was posted to Britain and ended up at HMS Vernon, the Royal Navy's mine disposal and developing mine countermeasures establishment. He won the George Medal in 1941 for defusing a series of mines, and was awarded a Bar to this in 1942 after defusing a mine lodged in a reservoir embankment in London.

In 1943 he was awarded the George Cross "for great bravery and undaunted devotion to duty". He had carried out nineteen mine-recovery operations. The most important was in November 1942 at Weston-super-Mare, Somerset, where he defused a new mine known as a Type T. He had to hang upside down in a mudhole and endure painful electric shocks while insulating the wires for the detonator. His George Cross made him the most decorated member of the Royal Australian Navy at that time. He returned to Australia in 1943 and set up a mine disposal unit at HMAS Cerberus. However the unit was not used operationally, as the United States Navy controlled mine clearance operations in the Pacific area.

The story of his wartime service was told in Softly Tread The Brave – A triumph over terror, devilry, and death by mine disposal officers John Stuart Mould, GC, GM and Hugh Randal Syme, GC, GM and Bar, and Seventeen Seconds – The gripping true story of the men who dismantled live Nazi bombs in England during World War II, both by Ivan Southall.

== Later life ==
He returned to The Age and became general manager in 1946. He continued in senior posts in newspapers and broadcasting for the rest of his life. He was awarded the Queen Elizabeth II Coronation Medal in 1953 but turned down a knighthood, feeling that he had performed no more than his duty. Hugh Syme died on 7 November 1965 from a cerebral tumour at Epworth Hospital, Richmond, and was cremated with Anglican rites and full naval honours.
