= Liam O'Connor (architect) =

British architect

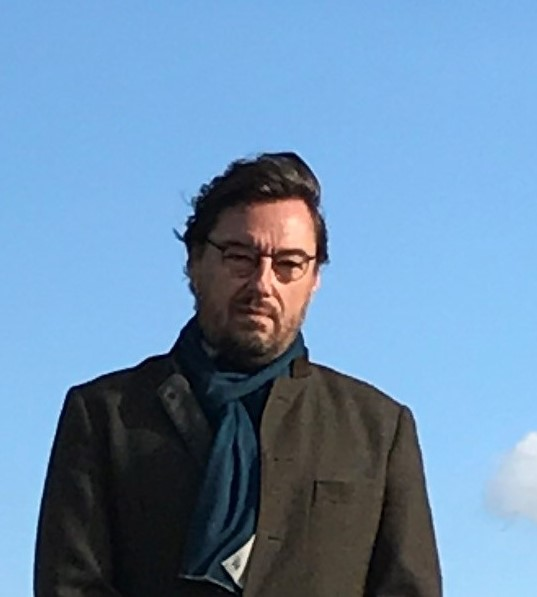
Liam O’Connor, Architect

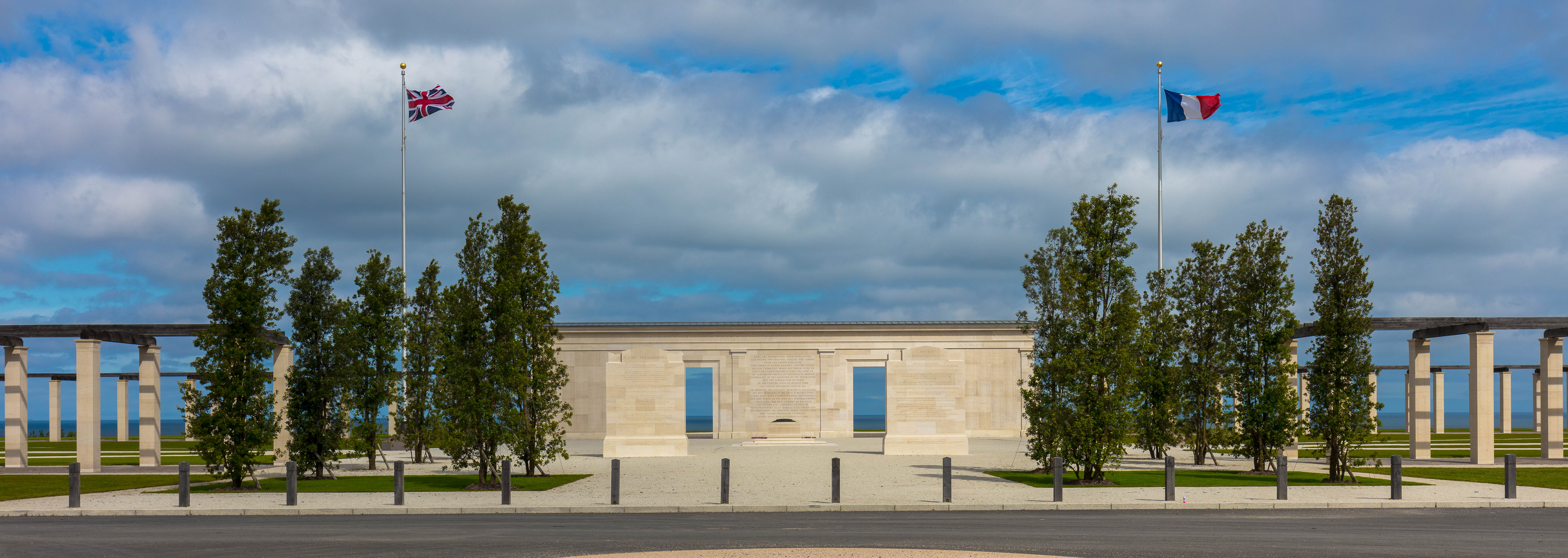
British Normandy Memorial, France

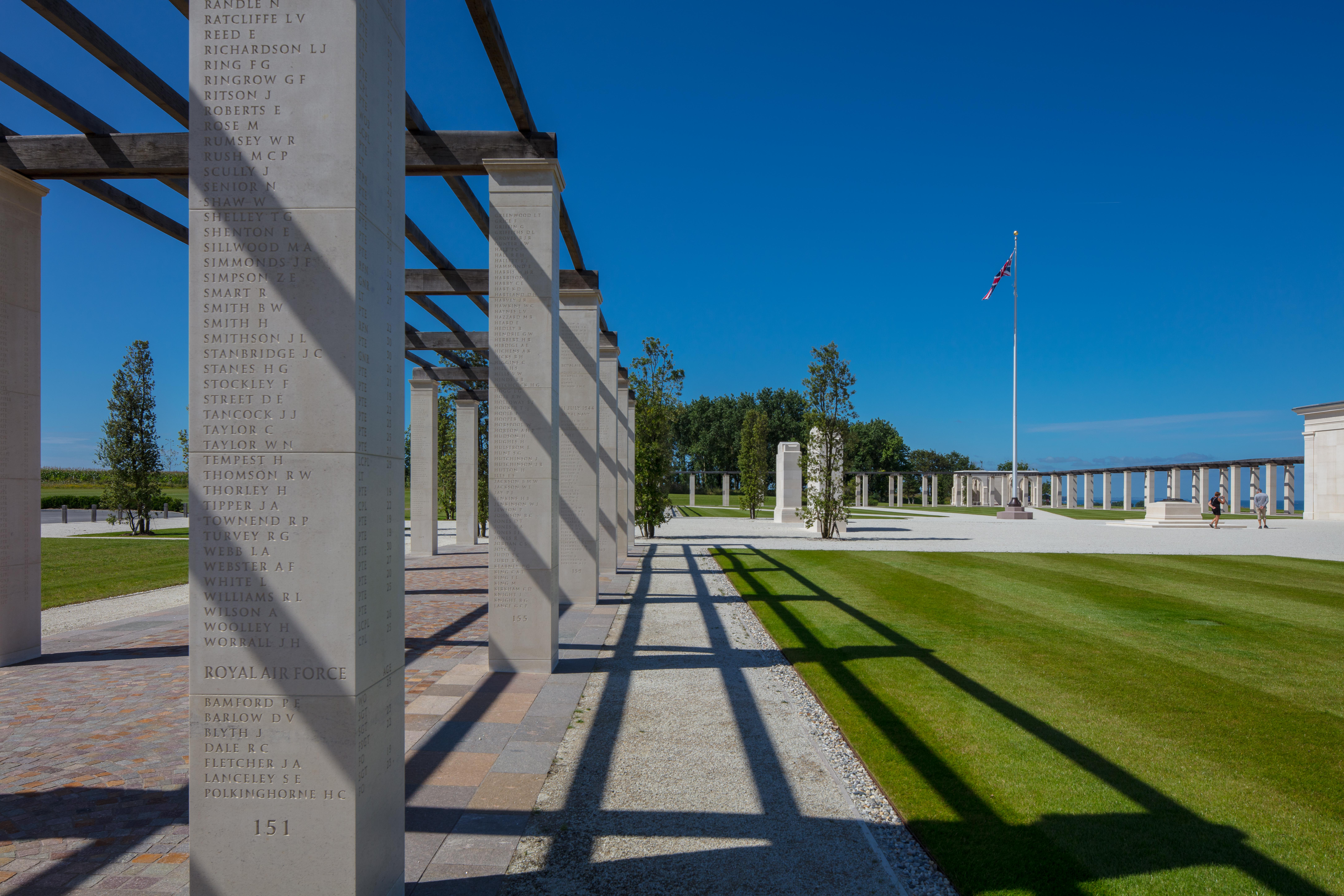
British Normandy Memorial, France, The Cloister Garden

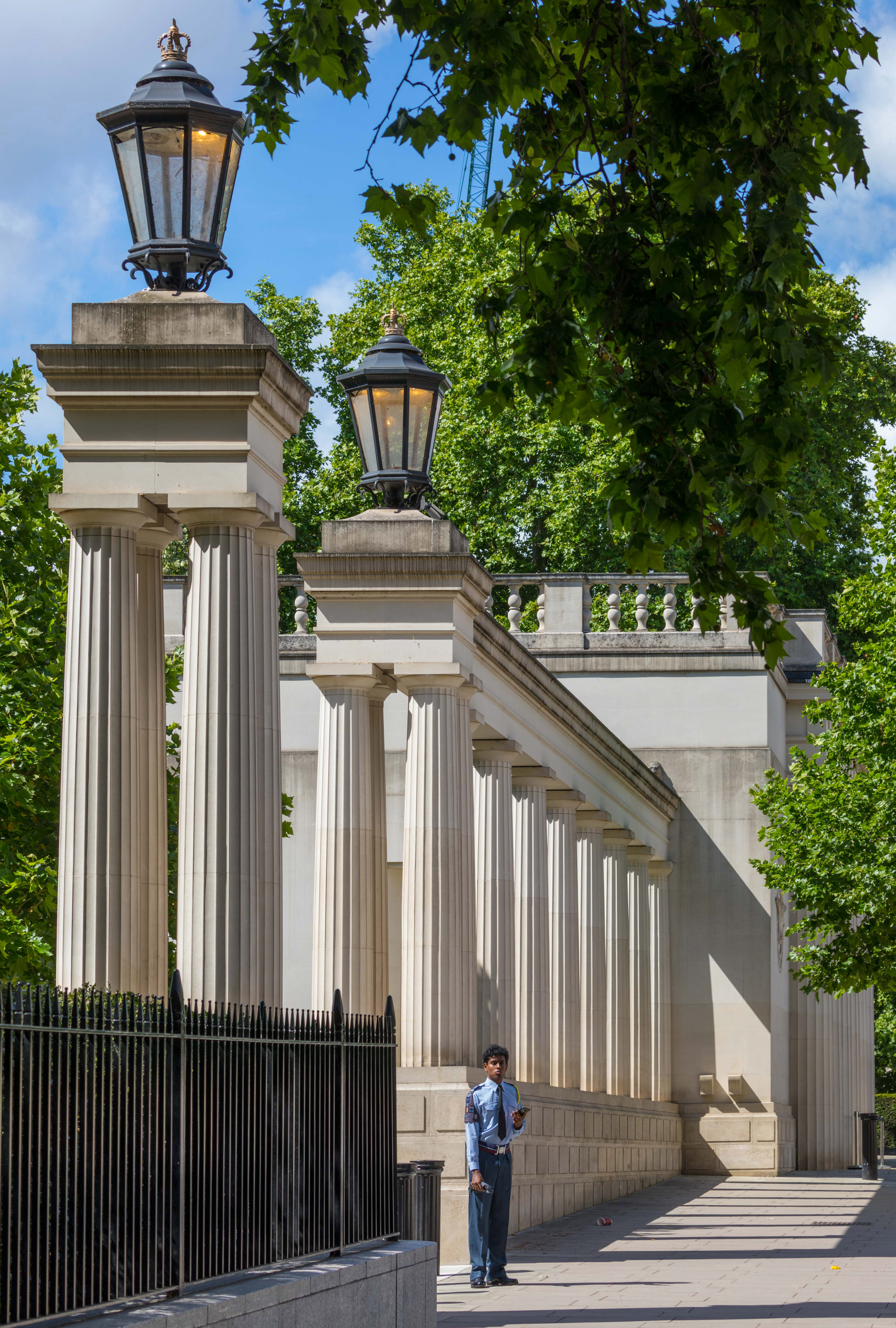
RAF Bomber Command Memorial, London Photo: Nick Carter

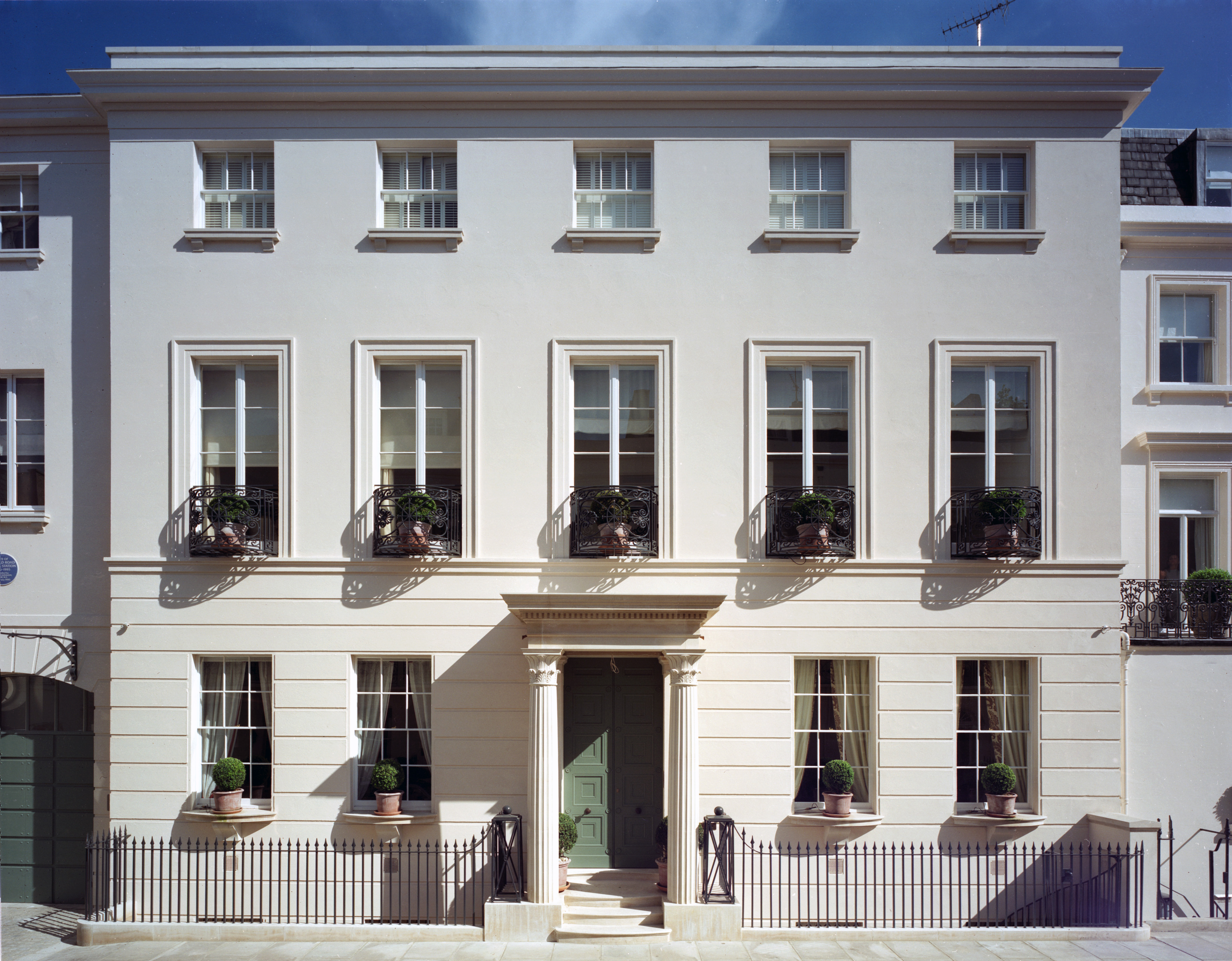
Liam O'Connor Architect. New House in Belgravia, Photo: Nick Carter

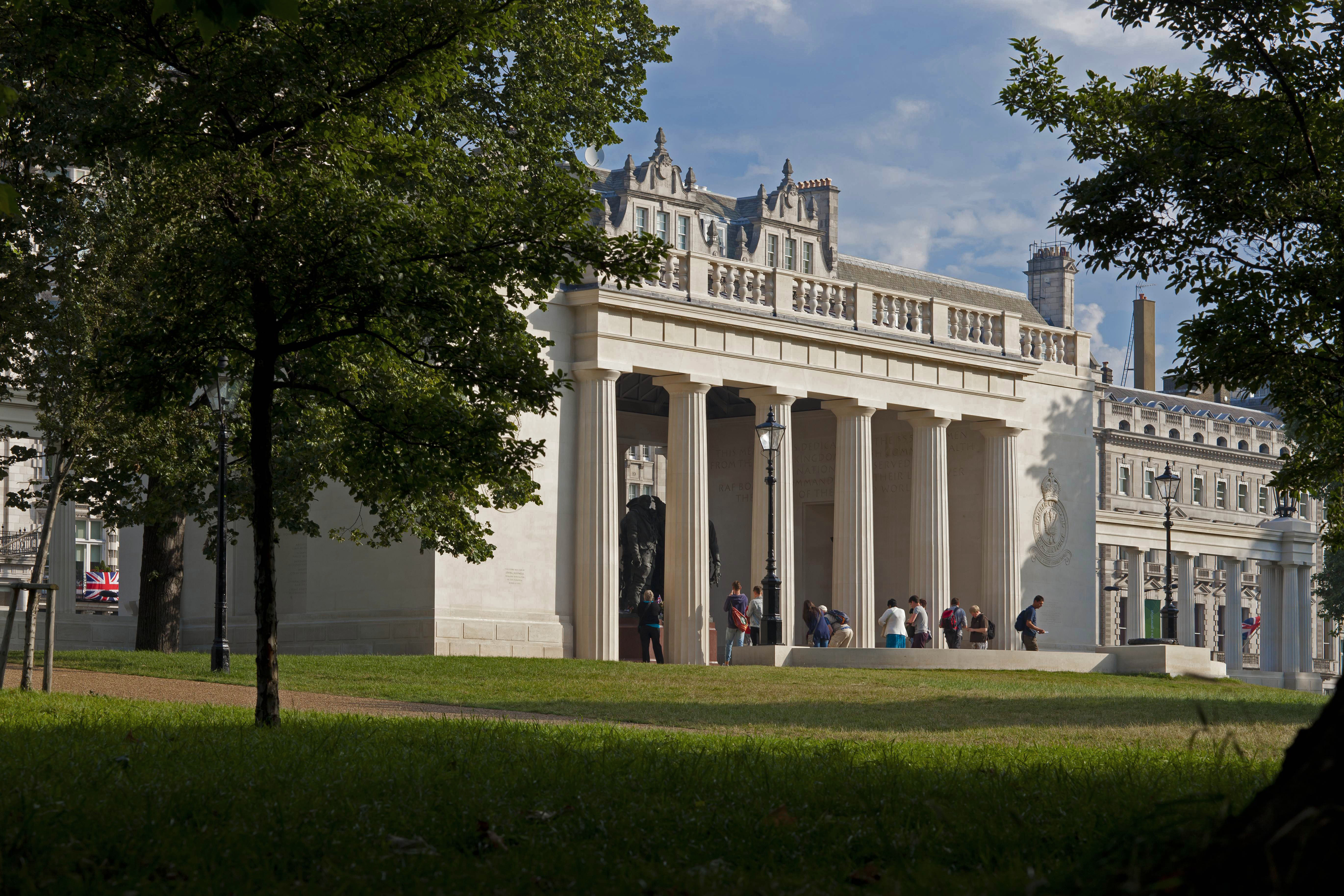
Royal Air Force Bomber Command Memorial, Piccadilly, London. Liam O'Connor Architect. Photo: Nick Carter

Liam O'Connor (born 1961) is a British architect best known for designing national public memorials in a contemporary classical style.

== Biography ==
O'Connor established his own practice, Liam O’Connor Architects and Planning Consultants, in 1989. In 1992 he won a European prize for his design of two buildings as part of a new urban block development in the centre of Brussels. In 1992, O’Connor received the first prize for his masterplan on the redevelopment of the area around the Polish Academy of Sciences in Warsaw. Between 1995 and 1997 he was a special adviser for architecture and urban design to John Gummer during his tenure as Secretary of State for the Environment.

In 1999 he won the international competition to design the Memorial Gates, London, which were inaugurated by Elizabeth II in 2002. In 2004, O'Connor was the architect for the Victoria Cross and George Cross Memorial at the Ministry of Defence Main Building in London. The same year he entered the winning design for the Armed Forces Memorial at the National Memorial Arboretum in Staffordshire, which was official dedicated in a ceremony led by Queen Elizabeth II on 12 October 2007. O'Connor subsequently designed the RAF Bomber Command Memorial, set between Piccadilly and The Green Park in central London, unveiled by Elizabeth II in 2012 during her Diamond Jubilee year.

Liam O'Connor worked alongside Zaha Hadid in the restoration of and extensions to the eighteenth century Magazine Building in Hyde Park Gardens for the creation of a new exhibition facility for the Serpentine Gallery which opened in 2013. The firm then designed the Orangery New Building at Kensington Palace for Historic Royal Palaces. This was a carefully placed extension in brick and Portland stone to the Grade I listed Orangery at the Palace, an eighteenth century work attributed to Vanbrugh and Hawksmoor.

O'Connor was commissioned to design the British Normandy Memorial in Ver-sur-Mer, France, which was formally inaugurated on 6 June 2019 by British Prime Minister Theresa May and French President Emmanuel Macron.

O'Connor is a member of the Royal Institute of British Architects, the Art Workers' Guild and INTBAU, and a fellow of the Royal Society of Arts. He was previously an adjunct professor in architecture at the University of Notre Dame. In addition to memorials, he has designed numerous residential and commercial buildings.

=== Awards ===
His new house in Belgravia, one of the largest new houses on the Grosvenor Estate in a century, won the UK Property Awards 'Best Architecture Single Residence, London' award in 2022.

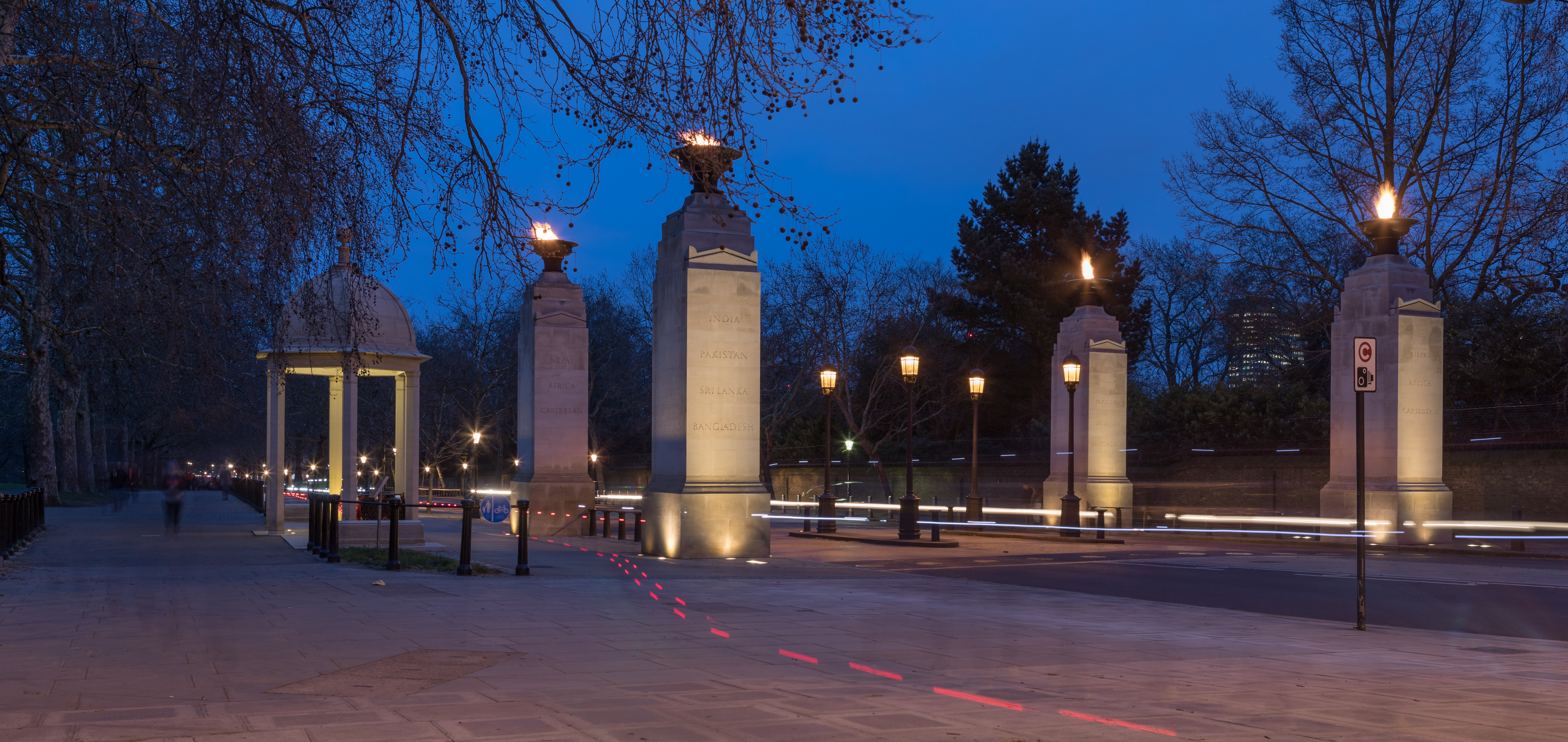
The Memorial Gates, Constitution Hill, London Photographer: Nick Carter Photography

The Armed Forces, Normandy and RAF Bomber Command memorials have won the US based National Sculpture Society Henry Hering Medal for Art & Architecture in 2022, 2023 and 2024.

Liam O'Connor is the 2025 Laureate of the Richard H. Driehaus Prize. The jury acknowledged his lifelong dedication to the design of a body of excellent new traditional public and private buildings and civil monuments – ''works projecting grace and beauty and expressing the shared emotions and cultural expectations of their audiences.''

On 18 September 2026, O'Connor was awarded in Paris the Chevalier Médaille d'Argent of the Association Nationale Franco-Britannique, in recognition of his service and contribution to Franco–British relations and heritage.
