= British Normandy Memorial =

War memorial in Normandy, France

Coordinates: 49.338229°N 0.537598°W

- United Kingdom
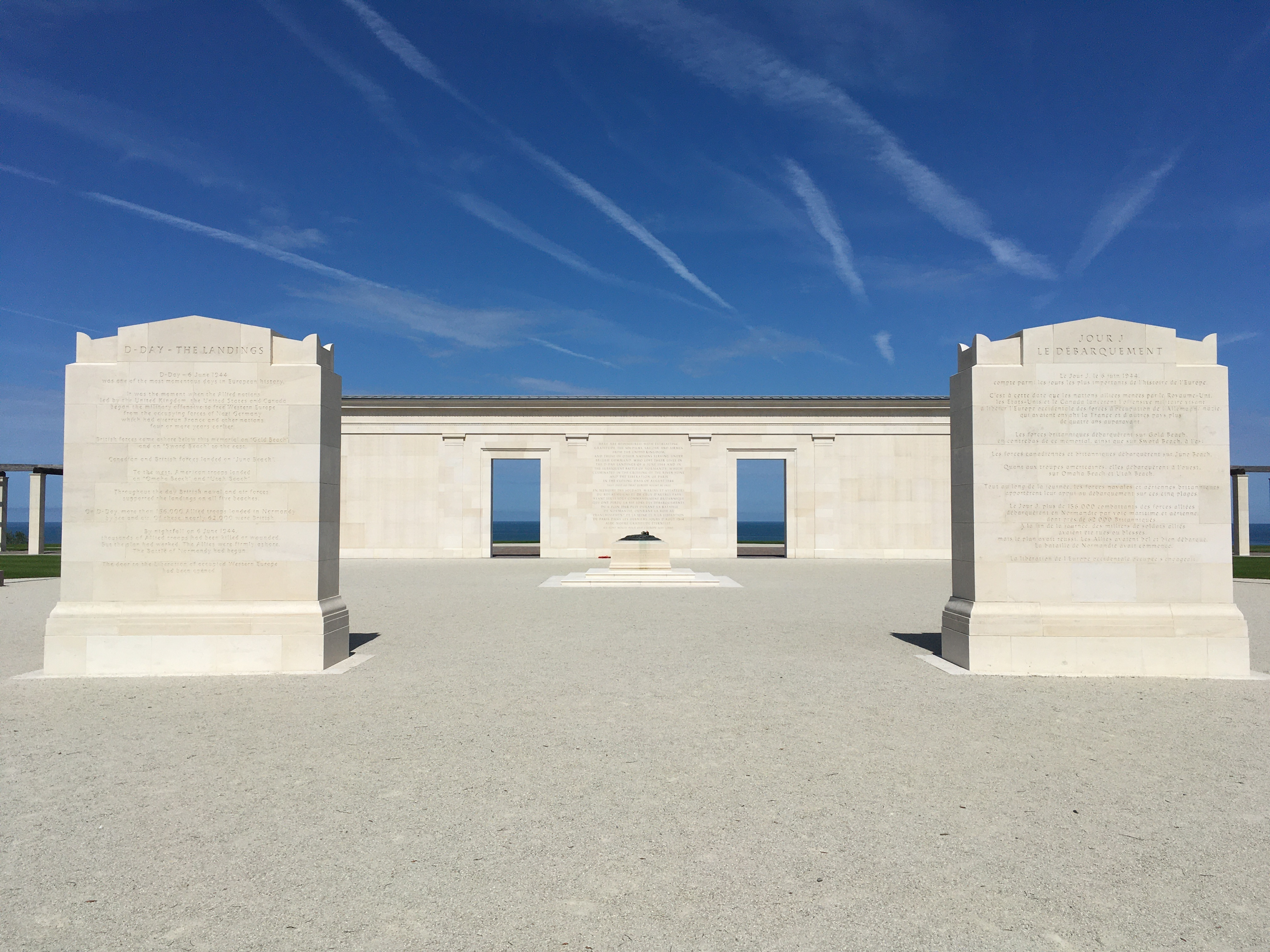
- For the British dead of the Normandy landings
- Location: Ver-sur-Mer, Calvados, Normandy, France
- Designed by: Liam O'Connor (architect); David Williams-Ellis (sculptor); Richard Kindersley (typeface)
- Commemorated: 22,442

The British Normandy Memorial is a war memorial near the village of Ver-sur-Mer in Normandy, France. It was unveiled on 6 June 2021, the 77th anniversary of D-Day, and it is dedicated to soldiers who died under British command during the Normandy landings. (Note: Also known as D-Day or Operation Neptune.)

The memorial records the names of 22,442 people from more than 30 countries under British command who were killed in Normandy from 6 June to 31 August 1944.

== Background ==
The Normandy landings began just after midnight on 6 June 1944, with a glider assault to capture the Caen canal and Orne river bridges.

US forces began landings on Utah and Omaha Beaches at about 06:30. About an hour later, due to different tide conditions along the coast, British and Canadian forces landed on Gold, Juno and Sword Beaches, from Port-en-Bessin in the west to Ouistreham in the east. Ver-sur-Mer lies at the eastern end of King Sector of Gold Beach, near its border with the west edge of Juno Beach, on the road inland from the landing site around La Rivière to Crépon.

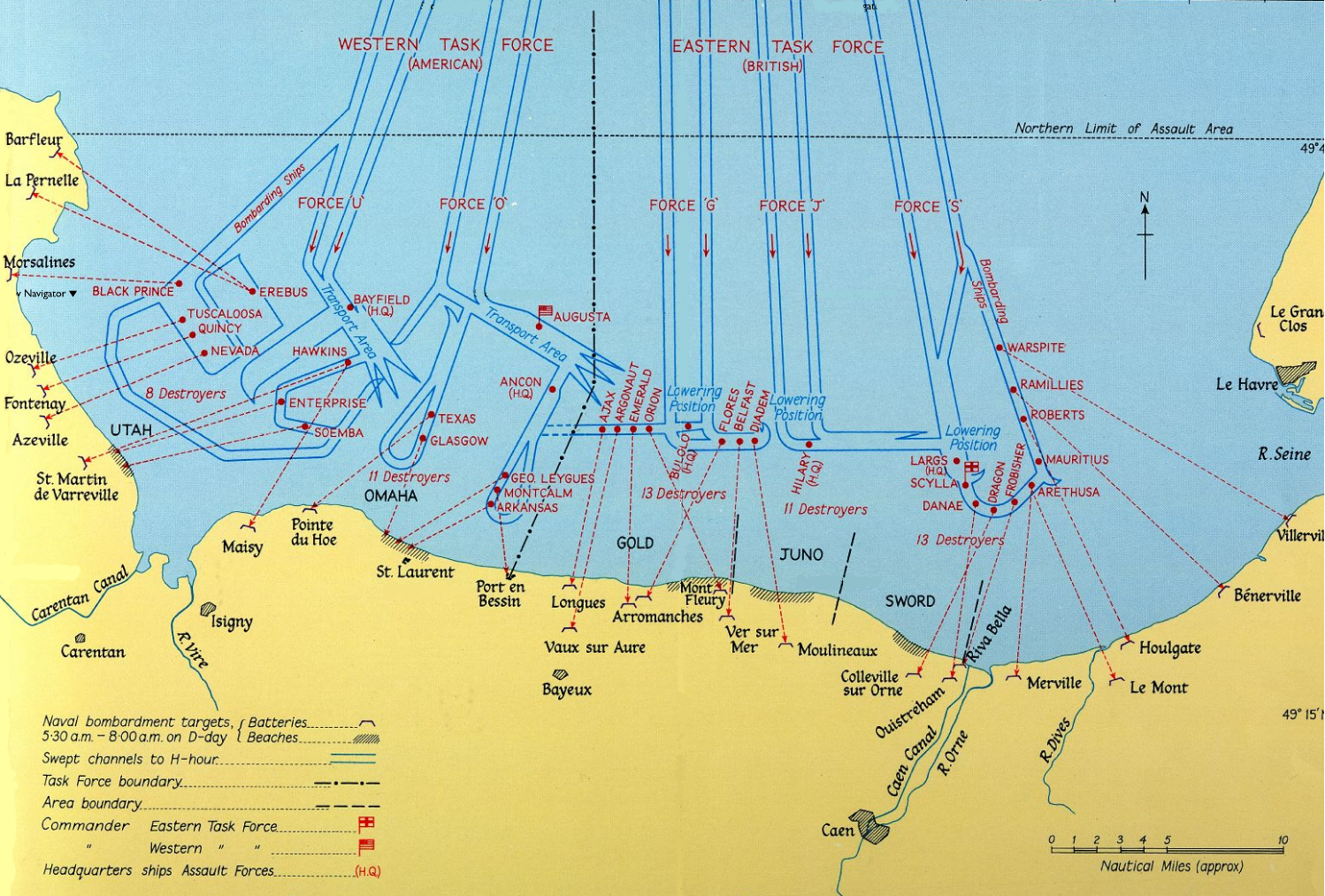
Map of the invasion area: Gold, Juno and Sword Beaches are in the eastern half of the landing area, with Ver-sur-Mer marked at junction of Gold Beach and Juno Beach, near the centre of the map

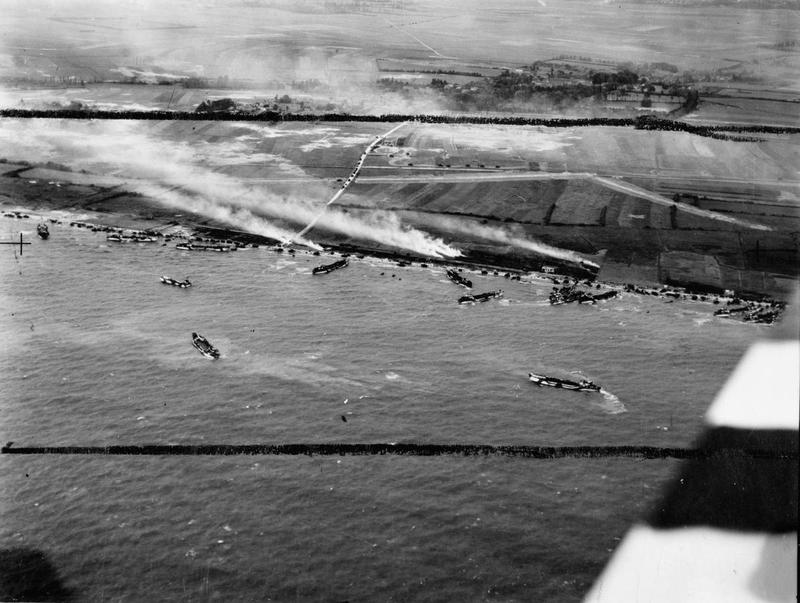
Aerial photo of the junction of King Red and King Green beaches, Gold assault area, on 6 June 1944. The Mont Fleury battery (WN 35a) and an anti-tank ditch (a long chevron) are visible in front of the village of Ver-sur-Mer

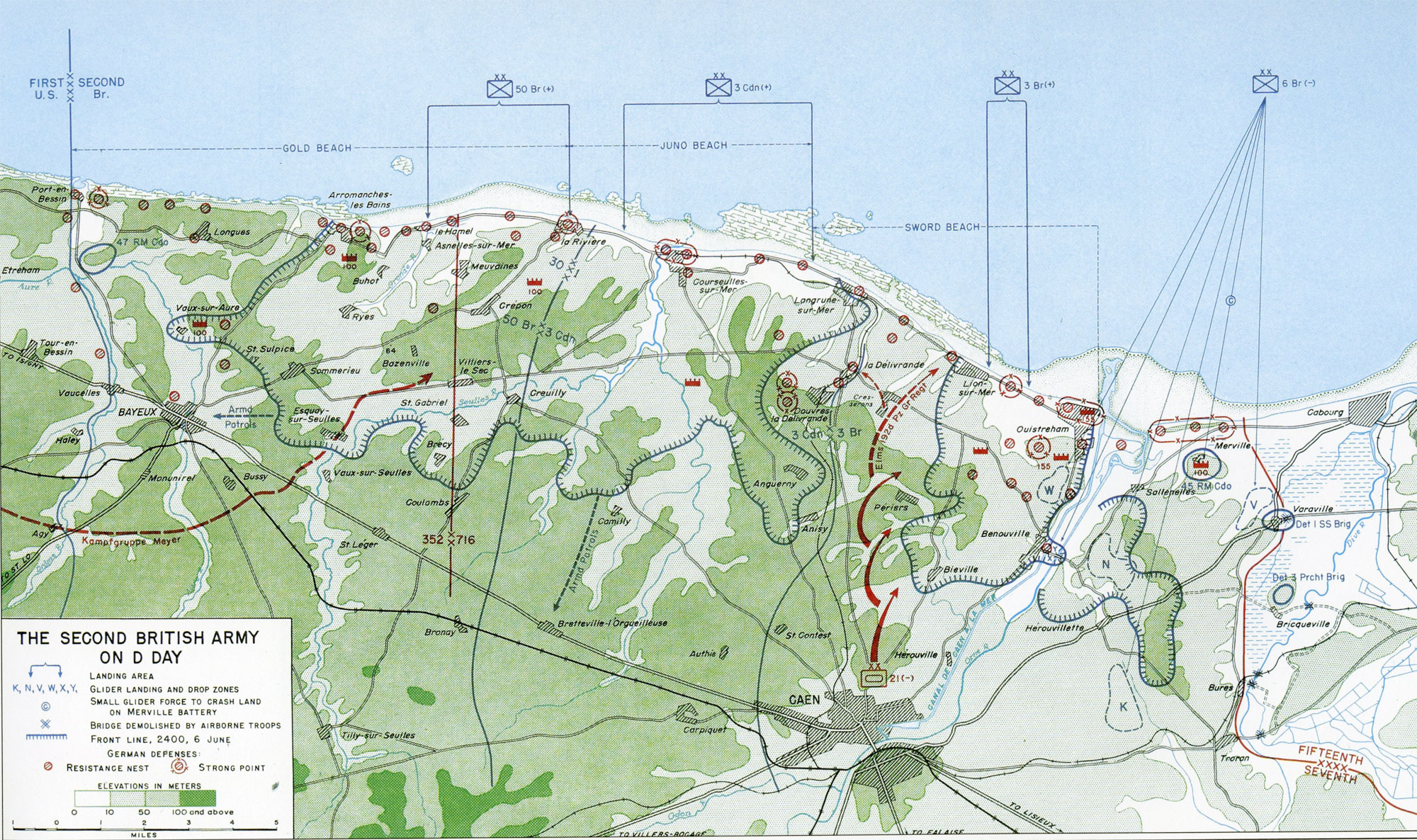
Map shows the British and Canadian beaches, and the positions at the close of D-Day

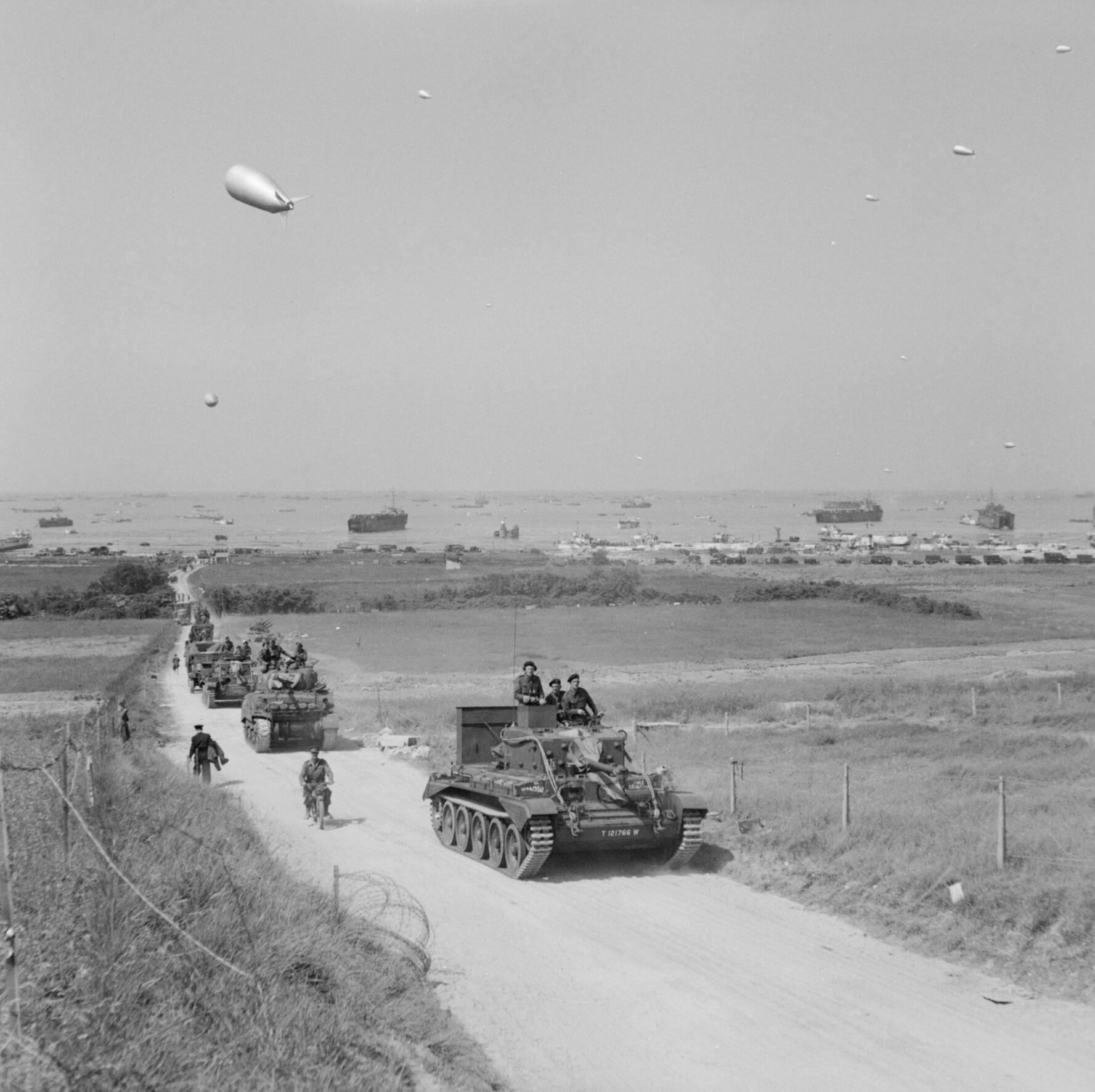
Column of British vehicles moving inland from King Sector, Gold Beach, on 7 June 1944

== Establishment ==
In July 2015, George Batts, a veteran of the Normandy landings, met with BBC journalist Nicholas Witchell. Batts pointed out that the United Kingdom was the only major Allied nation without a dedicated memorial in Normandy. The Normandy Memorial Trust was set up after their meeting.

Construction of the memorial cost 30,000,000 pounds sterling, of which £20 million was funded by the British government using proceeds from fines levied after the Libor scandal, and £10 million by private donations.

About 18 ha (44 acres) of land for the memorial were acquired on a hill to the west of Ver-sur-Mer overlooking Gold Beach, and permission for the memorial sought from French authorities in 2017 and 2018. The site was formally inaugurated by British Prime Minister Theresa May and French President Emmanuel Macron on 6 June 2019, the 75th anniversary of D-Day, after the installation of David Williams-Ellis's D-Day Sculpture.

Construction was performed from 2019 to 2020 by the French company Eiffage-Route. The stonework was made by the stonemasons S. McConnell and Sons at their works in Kilkeel, County Down, Northern Ireland, using 4,000 tons of French limestone from Massangis.

== Design and symbolism ==
The memorial was designed by British architect Liam O'Connor, who previously designed the British Armed Forces Memorial at the National Memorial Arboretum in Staffordshire, and also the RAF Bomber Command Memorial in London. It lies parallel to the coast, about 700 m (2,300 ft) inland from Gold Beach. The memorial's lettering was designed by letter-cutter Richard Kindersley, and carved mechanically, rather than by hand.

The centrepiece of the memorial is a bronze sculpture by David Williams-Ellis, with larger than life size statues of three soldiers coming ashore during the D-Day landings.

The names of 1,746 people killed on D-Day, 6 June 1944, are inscribed on the D-Day Wall of the central memorial court, constructed around Williams-Ellis's sculpture. The dead on succeeding days are inscribed on 160 white columns of the cloister court in chronological order of death clockwise around the Memorial Court, up to 31 August (shortly after the closure of the Falaise Gap on 21 August and the liberation of Paris on 25 August, and just before the Supreme Headquarters Allied Expeditionary Force moved from London to Versailles and Dwight D. Eisenhower took direct command of Allied forces in Western Europe). The names are arranged on each day by service branch, including RAF personnel killed on supporting missions, and special forces and agents operating behind German lines, including members of the SAS and SOE. The roll of honour was compiled by professional historians, Jane Furlong and Andrew Whitmarsh.

Long crossing paths across the quadrangle of the memorial create a plan that resembles the Union Flag. At the centre of the quadrangle is a bronze wreath and shield by French sculptors Valentine Herrenschmidt and Christophe Charbonnel on a stone plinth bearing an inscription of words from the Tomb of the Unknown Soldier in Westminster Abbey. On the west side of the site is a memorial dedicated to the 20,000 French civilians killed during the war in Normandy.

In a field adjacent to the memorial are the remains of the Mont Fleury German battery of 122 mm (4.8 in) coastal guns that remained uncompleted on D-Day, with only one captured Soviet 122 mm gun M1931 (A-19) gun installed but not yet operational. The village of Ver-sur-Mer has a French war memorial, separate memorials to the Royal Artillery regiments of the 50th (Northumbrian) Infantry Division and to the 2nd battalion of the Hertfordshire Regiment, and a preserved Sexton self-propelled 25-pounder gun. A small memorial to CSM Stan Hollis of the Green Howards, the Stan Hollis Hut, stands by the beach near where he landed on 6 June 1944.

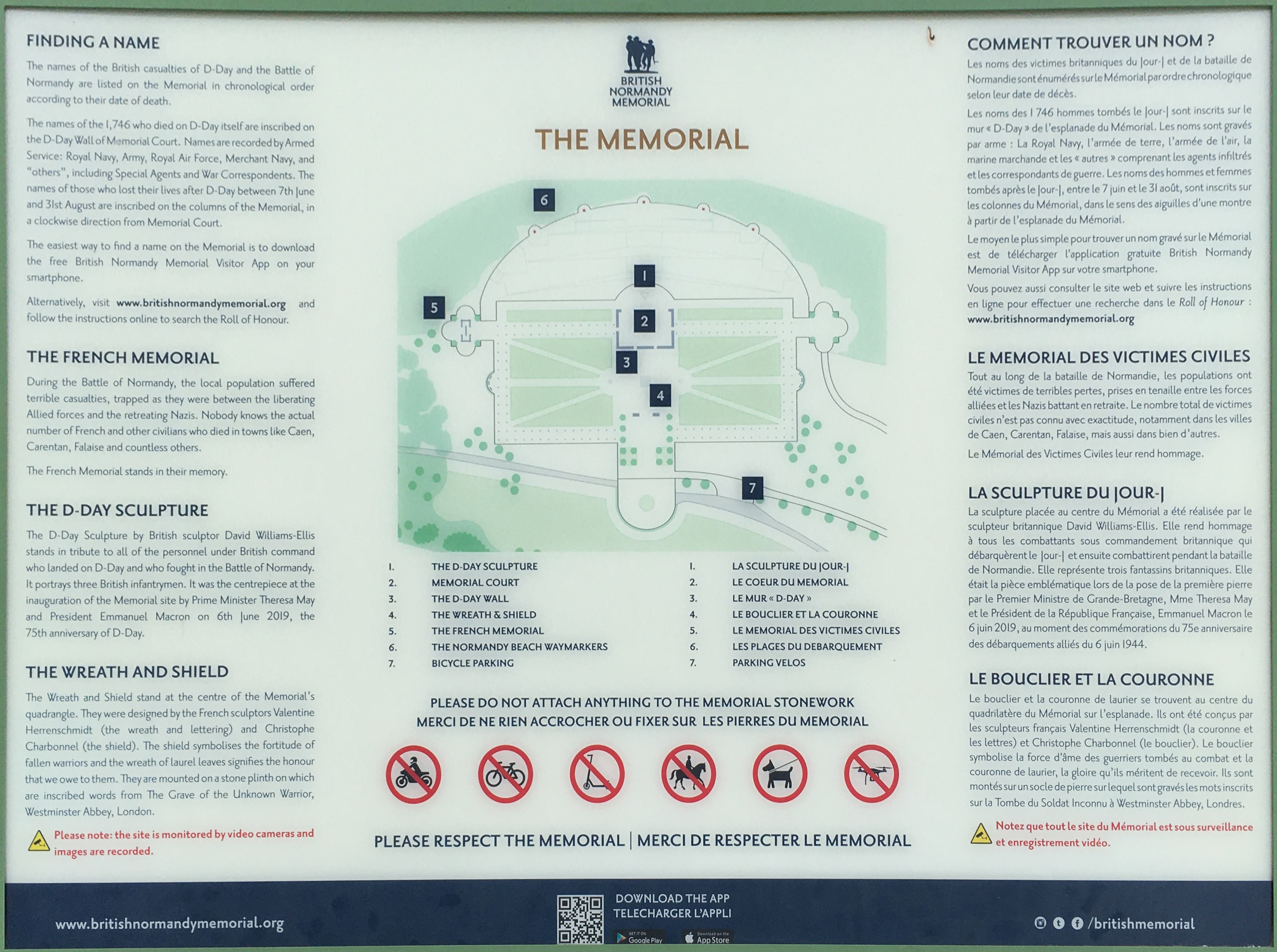
Map

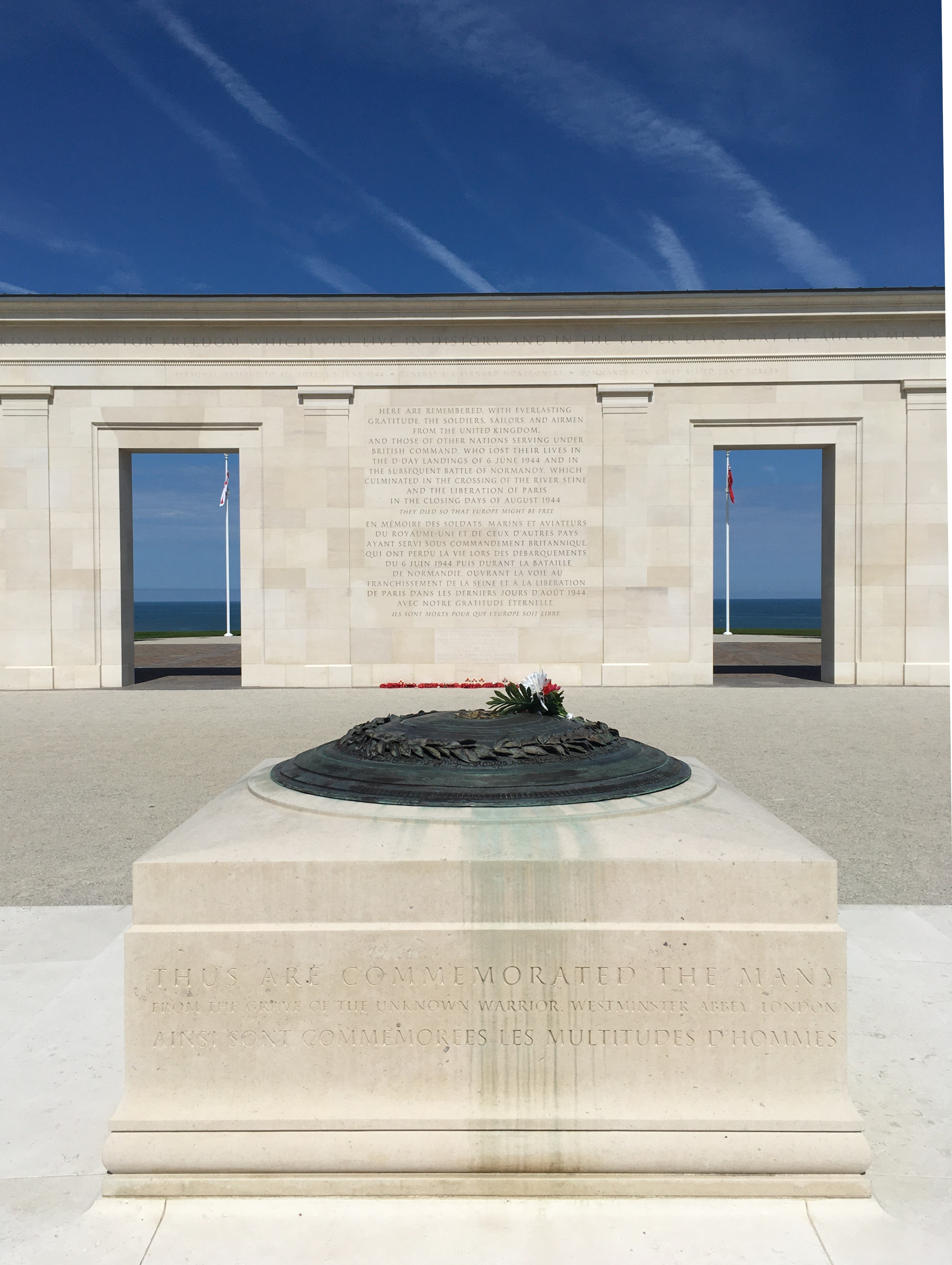
Wreath and shield

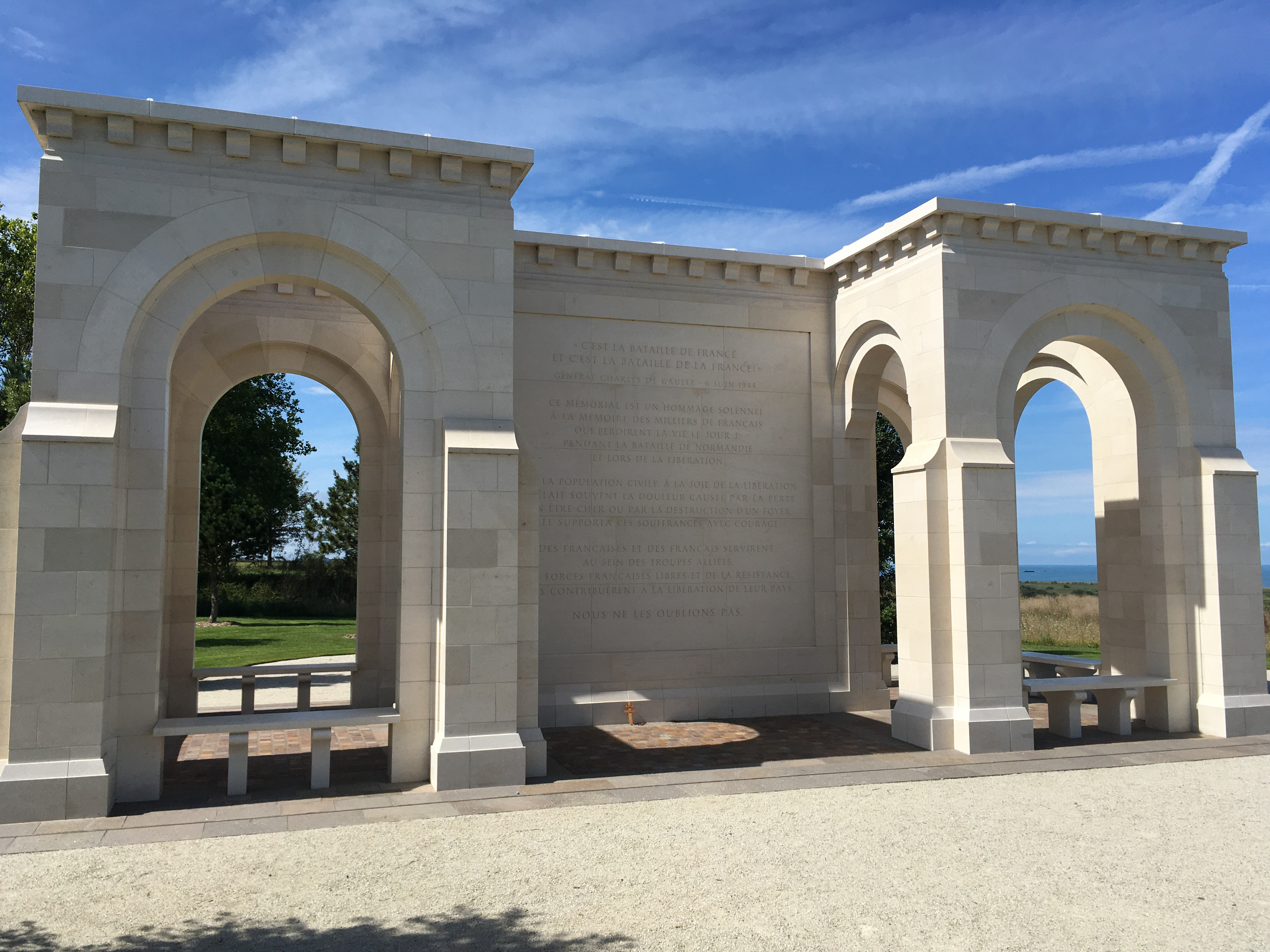
Memorial to French civilians
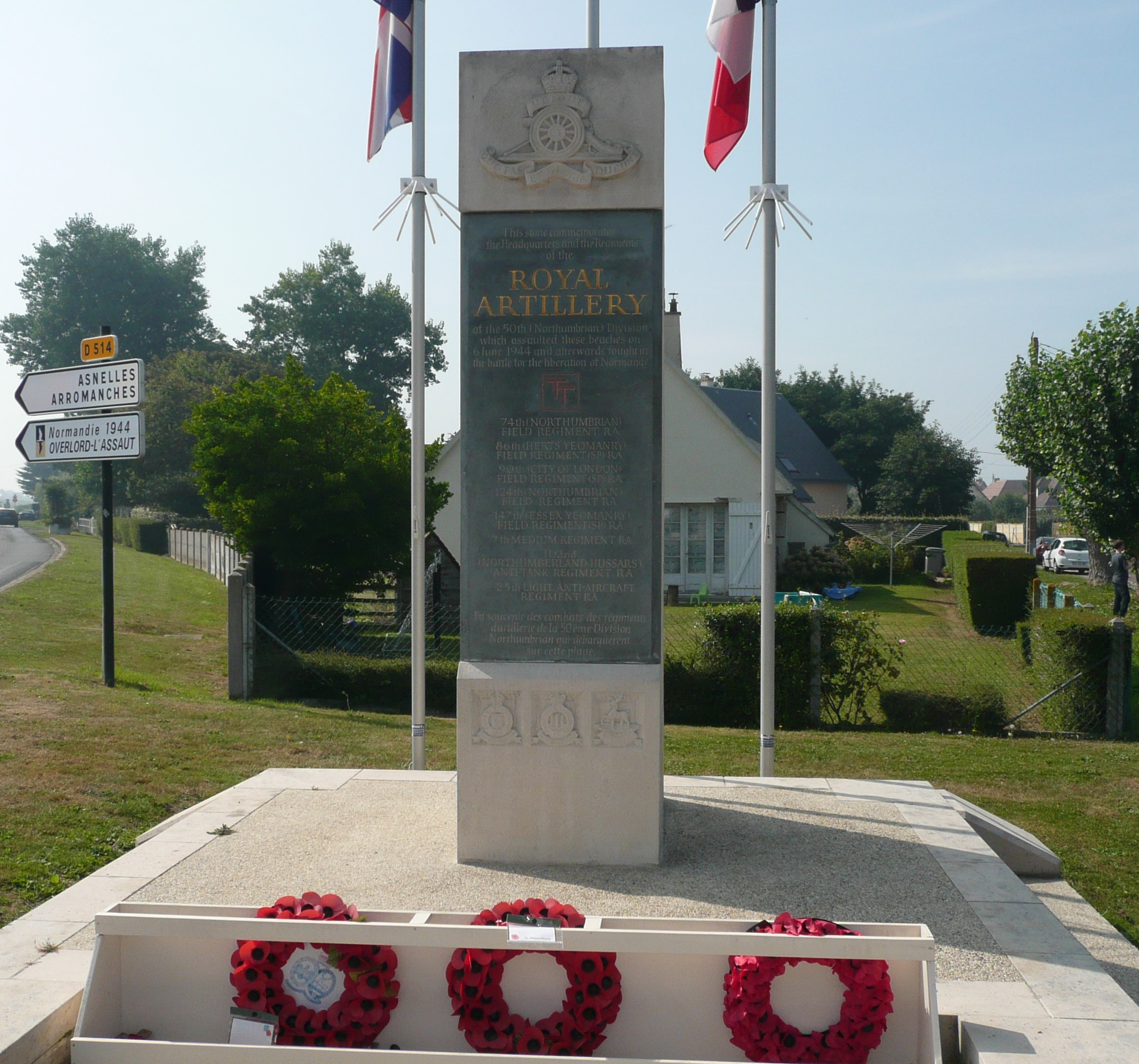
Royal Artillery memorial in Ver-sur-Mer

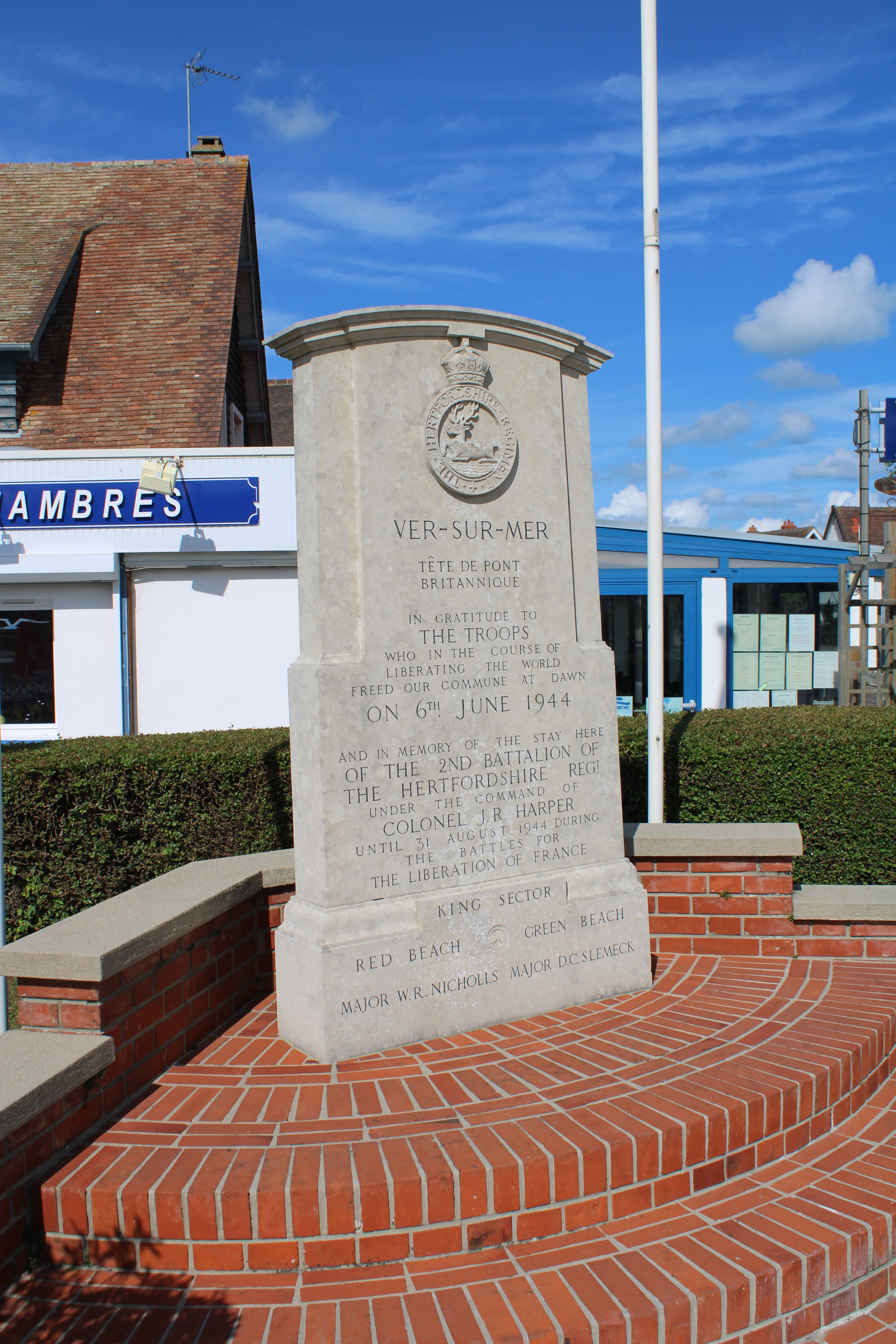
Hertfordshire Regiment memorial in Ver-sur-Mer

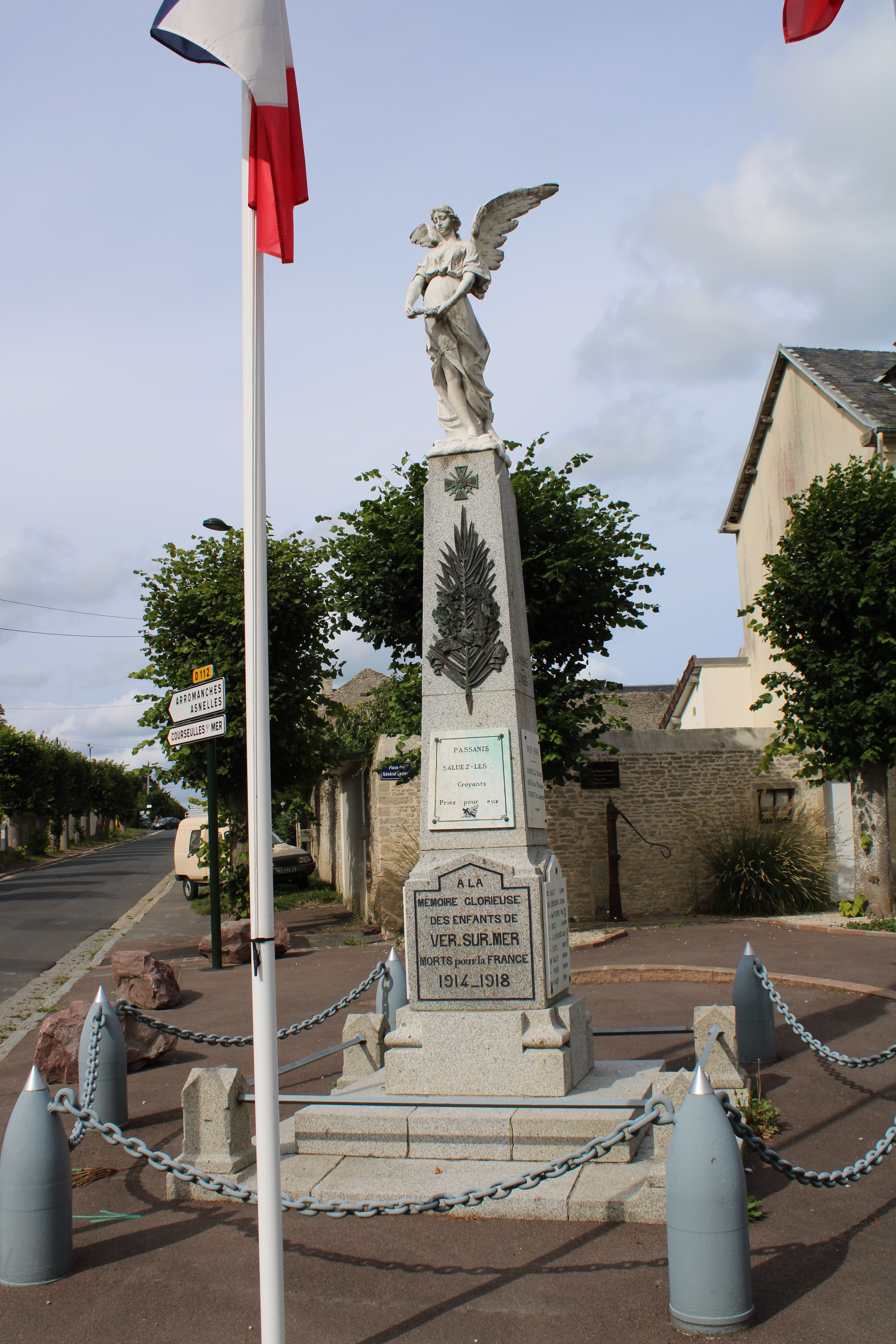
French war memorial in Ver-sur-Mer

== Reception ==
During planning some local residents expressed concern over an increase in tourism and environmental degradation to the area. The reaction of visitors and local residents since the memorial was completed has been very positive.

== Maintenance ==
The British Normandy Memorial is maintained in partnership with the Commonwealth War Graves Commission. As noted above, the construction of the memorial was supported by the British Government. Ongoing maintenance of the memorial and its landscape is funded through voluntary contributions.

== See also ==
- List of military cemeteries in Normandy
