= Armed Forces Memorial =

United Kingdom national memorial in Staffordshire

- United Kingdom
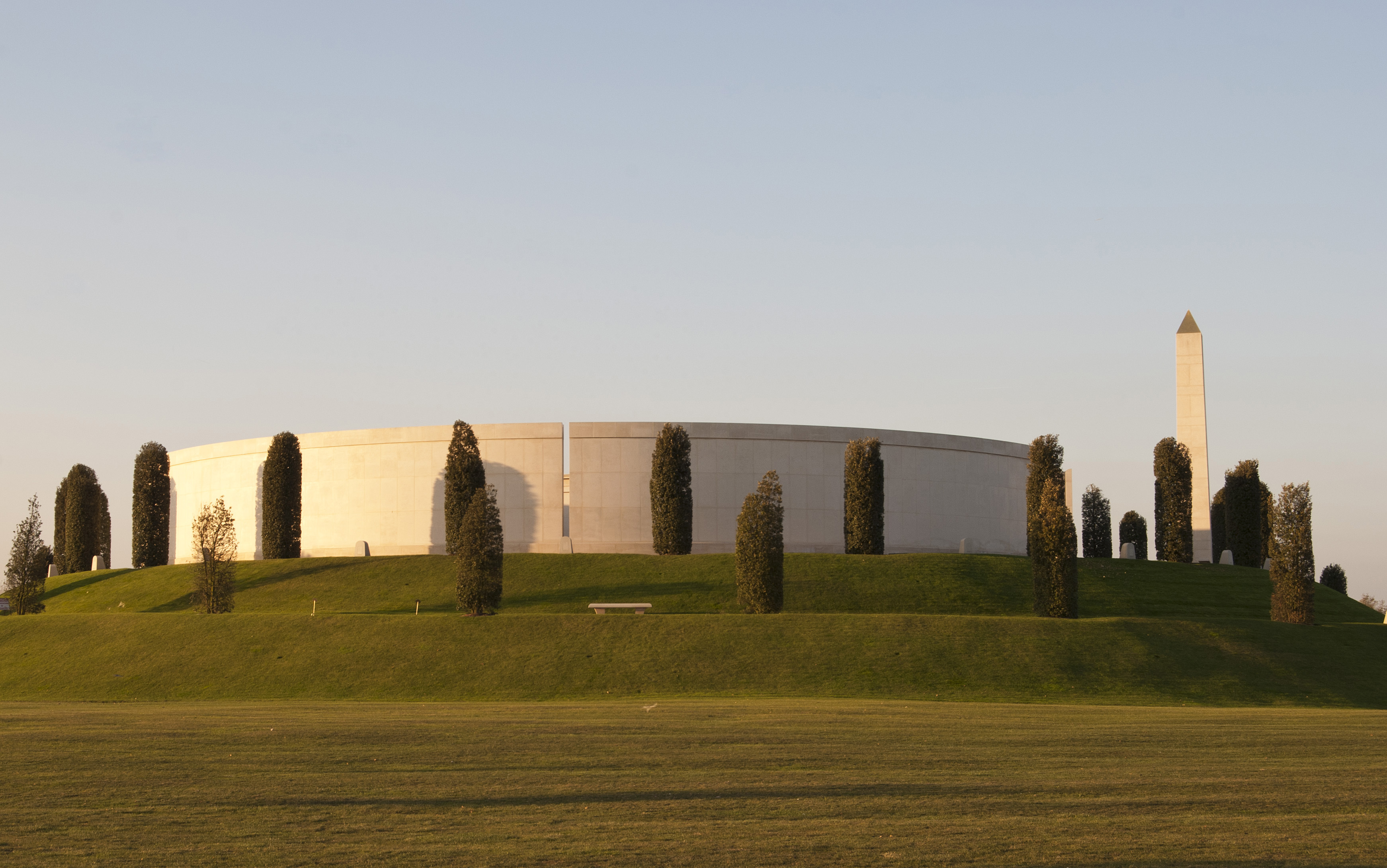
- The memorial, photographed on 15 October 2011
- For all UK servicemen and women killed on duty since the Second World War
- Unveiled: 12 October 2007
- Location: near Alrewas, Staffordshire
- Designed by: Liam O'Connor, Ian Rank-Broadley (sculptor)
- We Will Remember Them; Today, Tomorrow, Forever.

The Armed Forces Memorial is a national memorial in the United Kingdom, dedicated to the 16,000 servicemen and women of the British Armed Forces killed on duty or through terrorist action since after the Second World War. It is within the Royal British Legion National Remembrance Gardens in Staffordshire.

== History ==
The creation of a national memorial for members of the Armed Forces killed on duty was announced by the Secretary of State for Defence in a statement in the House of Commons on 10 November 2000, to be funded by public subscription.

An international competition was held for the design of the Memorial, which was won by Liam O'Connor Architects and Planning Consultants, with Ian Rank-Broadley, Sculptor. The project design team consisted of Liam O'Connor (architect), Christopher Barrett (project manager), Alan Baxter & Associates (structural & civil engineers), Christina Godiksen, Robert Rhodes, and Daniel Benson. Liam O'Connor also designed the Commonwealth Memorial Gates on Constitution Hill in London. Ian Rank-Broadley conceived and executed the sculpture of the Memorial. He earlier sculpted the effigy of Queen Elizabeth II which has appeared on coins in the UK and Commonwealth coins since 1998. The letter cutting was done by Richard Kindersley. The design of the Memorial was officially unveiled at the Imperial War Museum, London on 6 April 2005.

The Memorial was officially dedicated on 12 October 2007 in a ceremony presided by Queen Elizabeth II and attended by Prime Minister Gordon Brown and Archbishop of Canterbury Rowan Williams. It was opened to the public on 29 October 2007. At the unveiling Prince Charles, the Prince of Wales said:

The magnificence of this new memorial will, at long last, provide a fitting recognition for all those killed on duty since the end of the Second World War. It does not differentiate between those killed in the heat of battle or on a training exercise, by terrorist action or on peace-keeping missions.

In addition to the Memorial in Staffordshire, a memorial without names will be added to the South Cloister of Westminster Abbey, dedicated to members of the Armed Forces killed in conflict and the members of the Royal Fleet Auxiliary and the Merchant Navy who died in conflict zones since the end of the Second World War; and rolls of honour will be displayed at the St Martin-in-the-Fields (for the Royal Navy) and the chapel of the Royal Hospital Chelsea (for the British Army), in addition to the existing Rolls of Honour for the Royal Air Force at St Clement Danes in the Strand.

== Design ==
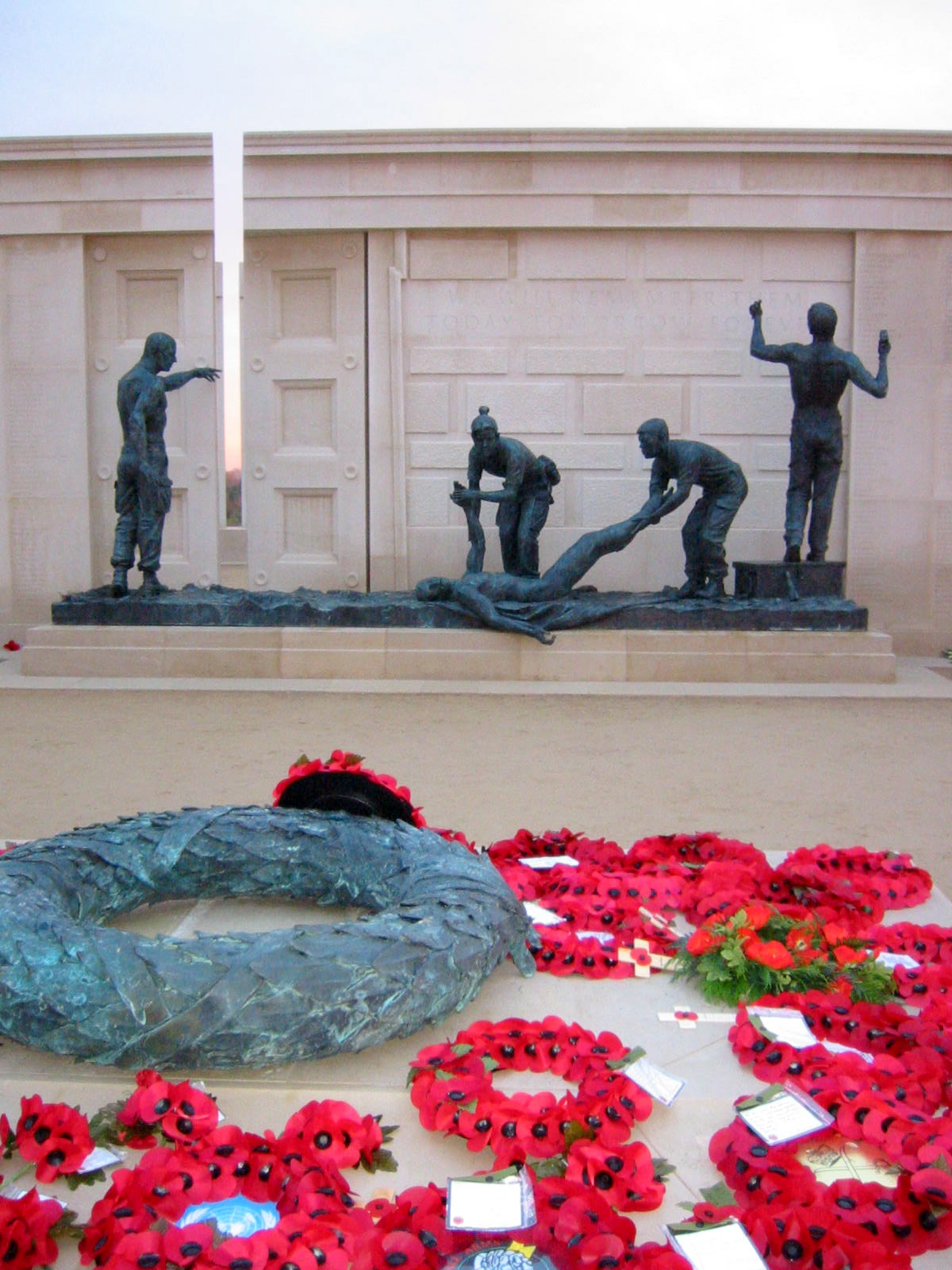
Armed Forces Memorial, Alrewas, Staffordshire. Southern sculpture showing opening in wall aligned on the sun's position for 11 November (photographed 16 November 2007)

The Memorial cost £6 million to build, principally funded by sales of a commemorative Trafalgar coin sold by the Royal Mint, and grants from the Millennium Commission. The Memorial takes the form of an earth tumulus (mound), 100 metres in diameter. Inspiration for the Memorial came from "the ancient burial mounds of our ancestors … that recollects monuments like Silbury Hill and the mounds around Stonehenge.

The mound is surmounted by a Portland stone circle, with openings to the east and west and an obelisk at the eastern end. Within the circle are two straight stone walls, with bronze sculptures at their centres. The names of the 16,000 service personnel are carved into the Memorial's stone walls, with space for an additional 15,000 names to be added. The names of all those killed in combat, in training, on peacekeeping operations and on exercise are included. It includes the dead from operations in Palestine, Korea, Malaya, the Falkland Islands, Iraq, Afghanistan, and Northern Ireland.

The earliest qualifying date for casualties being listed on the memorial is 1 January 1948. This follows on from the closing date for commemoration by the Commonwealth War Graves Commission of 31 December 1947, although the memorial also lists casualties of the 1947-48 Civil War in Mandatory Palestine (pre-independence Israel). Names are grouped under year of death, within each year grouped under the force in which they served.

The bronze sculptures are the work of Ian Rank-Broadley. The Stretcher Bearers sculpture shows a wounded serviceman borne by comrades, watched by grieving family. It represents the cost of armed conflict on those left behind. The Gates sculpture group shows the body of a fallen serviceman taken into the arms of his comrades, and a figure pointing through the Great Gates of Eternity to Paradise. For this work Rank-Broadley received the 2008 Marsh Award for Excellence in Public Sculpture.

The structure is aligned so that at the 11th hour of the 11th day of the 11th month, the sun's rays will stream through the gap to illuminate the centre of the Memorial.

== Location ==
The Memorial is located on a 150-acre (0.61 km^{2}) site at the National Remembrance Gardens, at Alrewas near Lichfield in Staffordshire, which opened in 2001, where there are already a number of Service-related memorials. A central location in the UK, outside London, was chosen deliberately to ensure that the memorial was accessible to all communities in the UK.

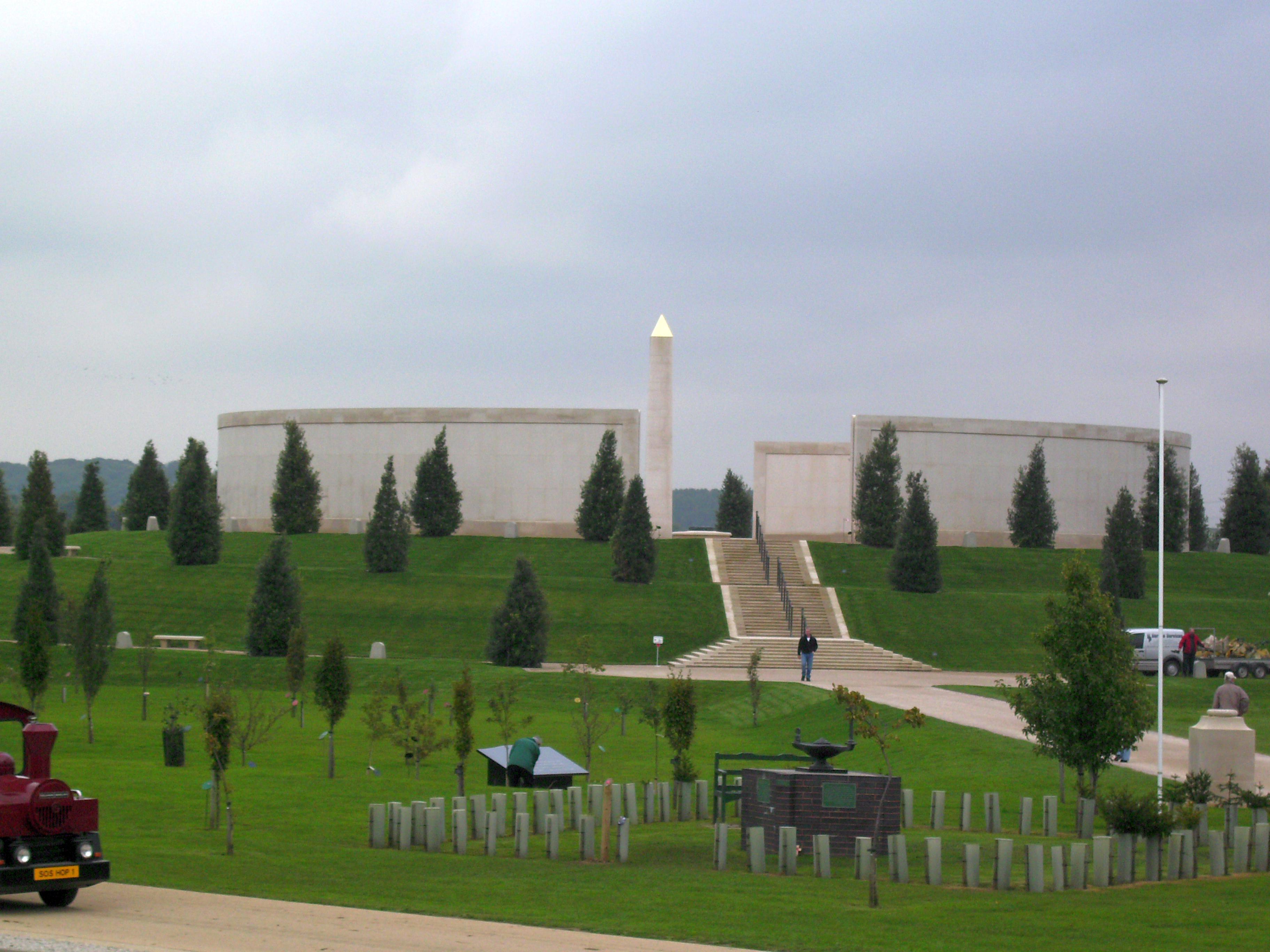
The memorial viewed from the visitor centre

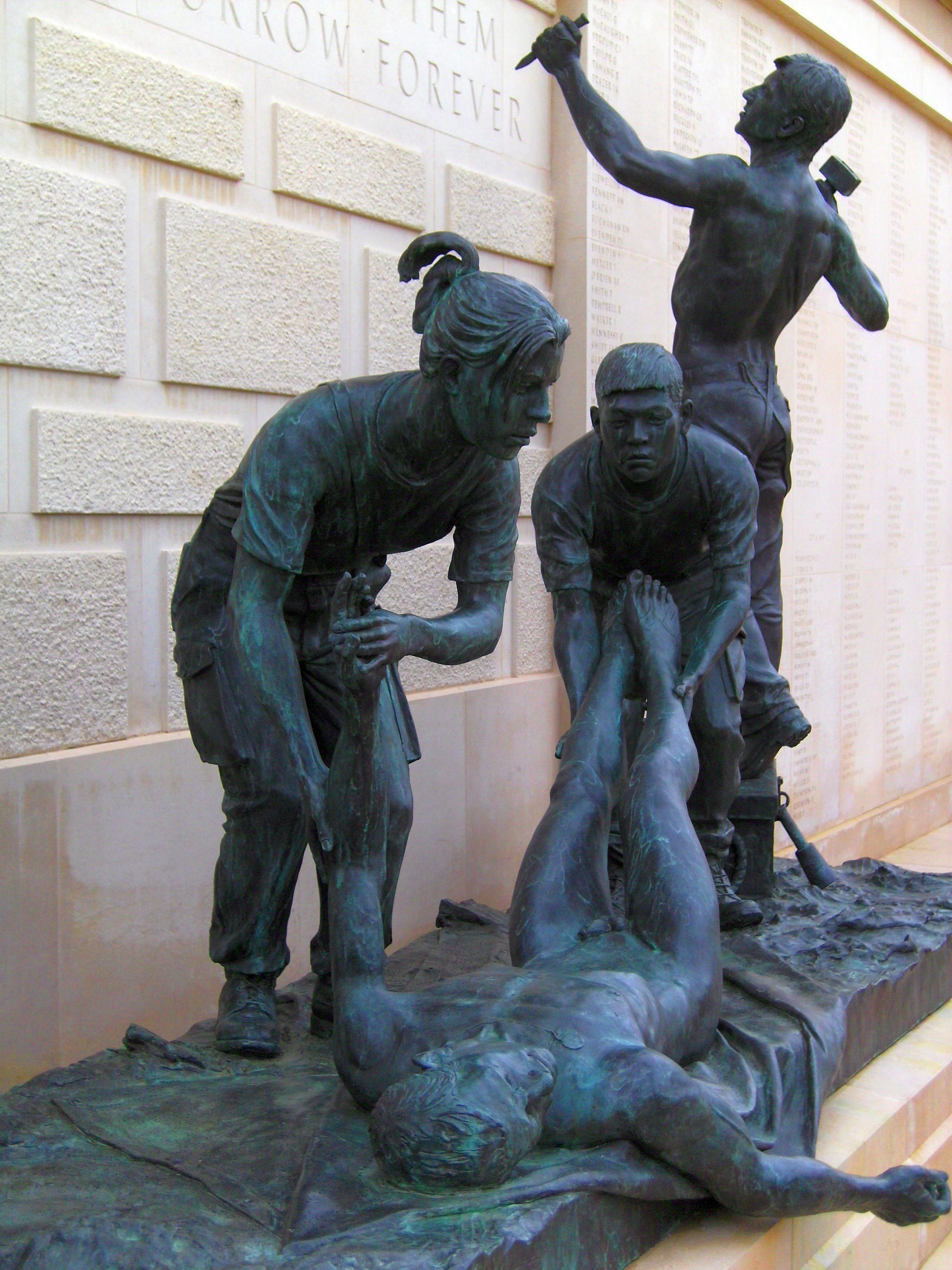
Detail of the south side of the memorial

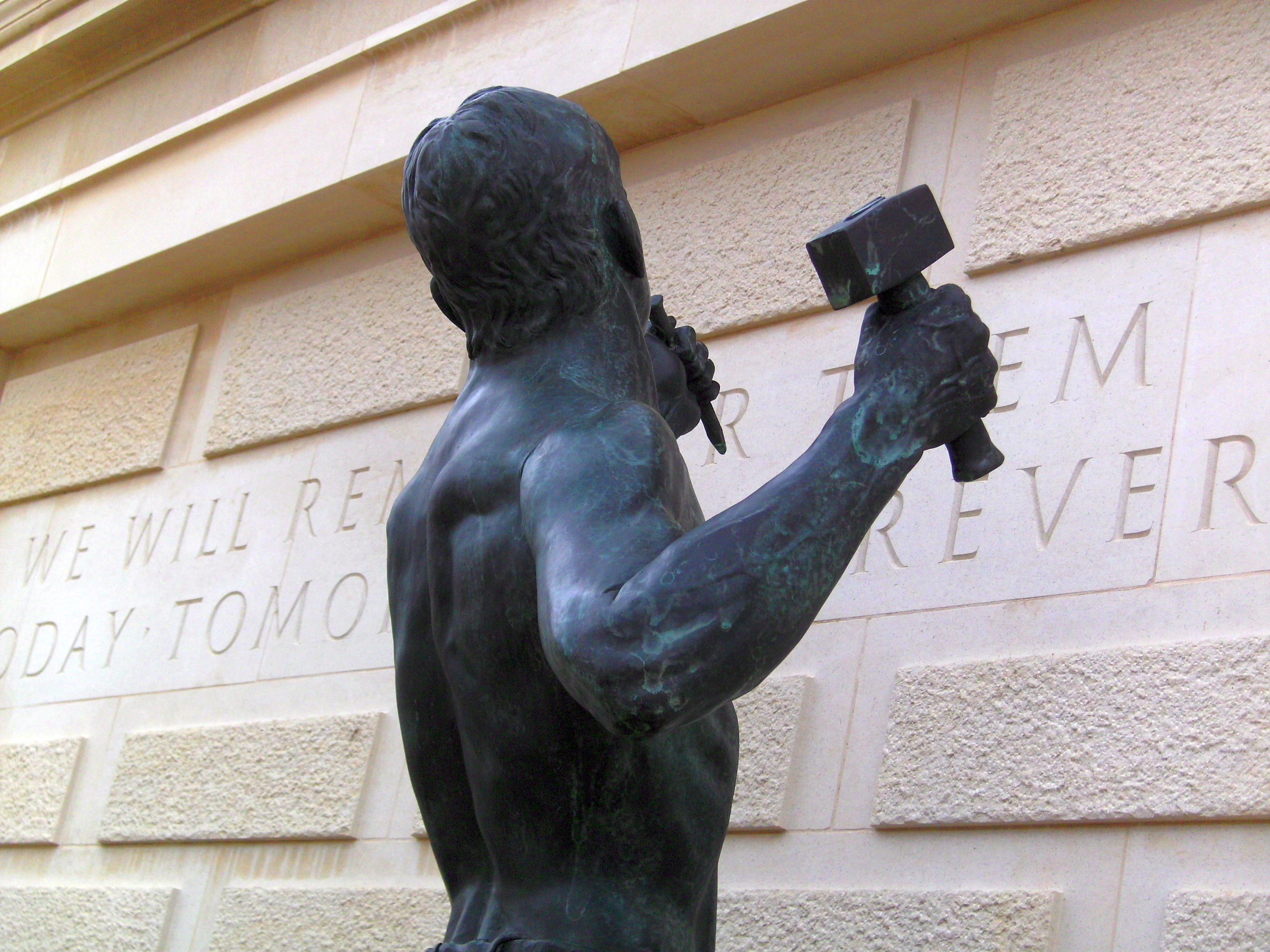
Detail of the south side of the memorial

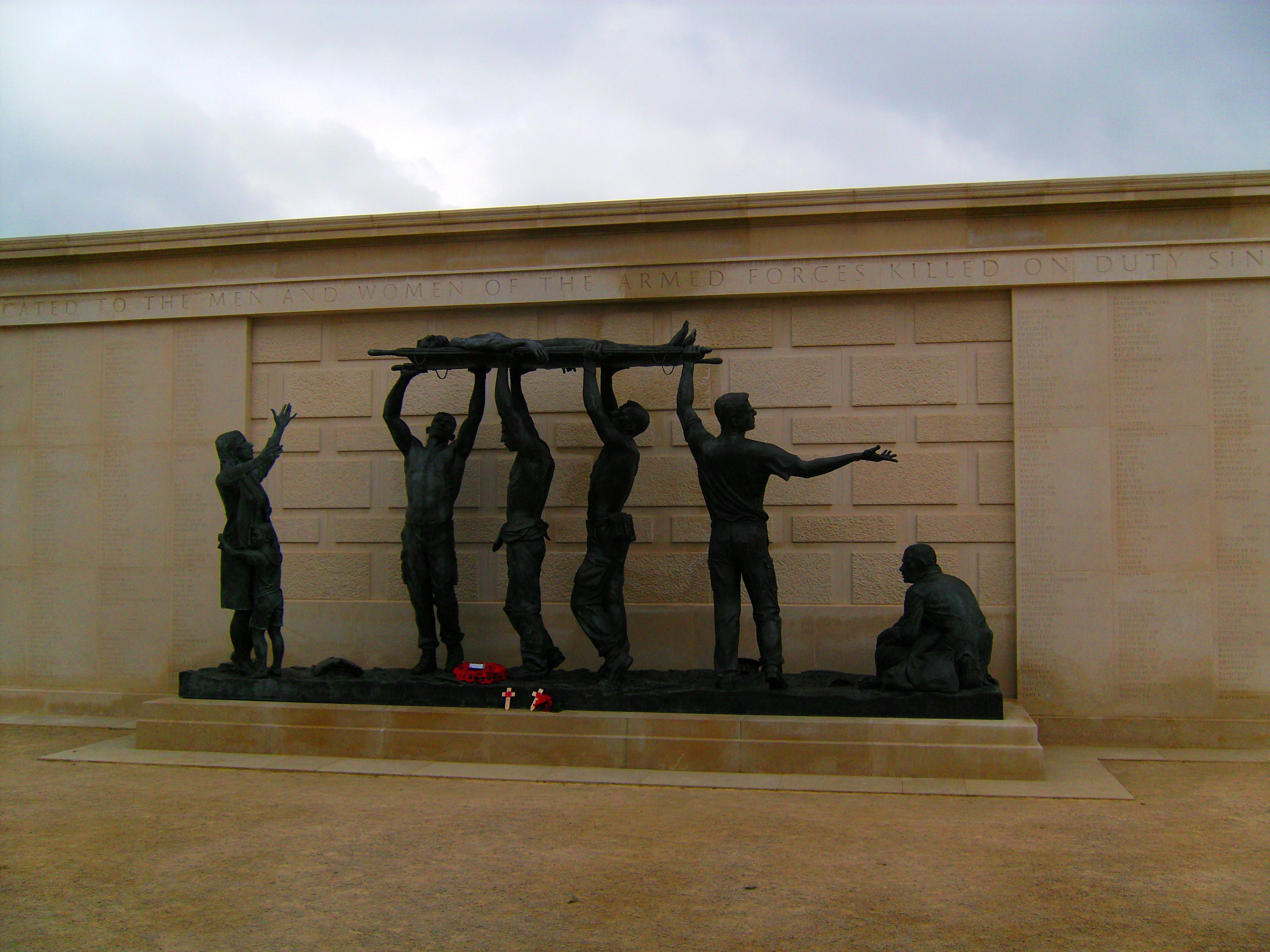
Detail of the north side of the memorial

== Notable commemoratees ==
Those whose names are inscribed on the memorial include (chronological order):

- Ivor Gillett (1928–1950), GC recipient
- Kenneth Muir (1912–1950), VC recipient
- Philip Curtis (1926–1951), VC recipient
- John Quinton (1921–1951), GC recipient
- Terry Waters (1929–1951), GC recipient
- Archibald Wavell, 2nd Earl Wavell (1916–1953)
- Robert Duncan ('Bob') Yule (1920–1953), Battle of Britain veteran pilot
- Charles Eric Rhodes (1928–1955), Albert Medal recipient
- Michael Paul Benner (1935–1957), GC recipient
- Robert Curtis (1950–1971), first British soldier killed on Operation Banner in Northern Ireland
- Vernon Erskine-Crum (1918–1971), army GOC Northern Ireland at start of Operation Banner
- Michael Willetts (1943–1971), GC recipient
- Talaiasi Labalaba (1942–1972), Fijian-born SAS participant in Battle of Mirbat
- Father Gerard Weston (1933–1972), army chaplain killed in IRA bombing
- Robert Nairac (1948–1977), GC recipient
- Ian Corden-Lloyd (1938–1978)
- Earl Mountbatten (1900–1979)
- Herbert Westmacott (1952–1980), highest-ranking SAS officer killed on Operation Banner
- Gavin Hamilton (1953–1982), highest ranking SAS soldier killed in the Falklands War
- Herbert ('H') Jones (1940–1982) VC recipient
- Ian McKay (1953–1982), VC recipient
- David Tinker (1957–1982), highest ranking Royal Navy officer killed in Falklands War
- Alistair ('Al') Slater (1956–1984)
- Stephen Saunders (1947–2000), assassinated British Military Attache, Athens
- Jonathan Hollingsworth (1971–2006), CGC recipient
- Bryan Budd (1977–2006), VC recipient
- Mark Wright (1979–2006), GC recipient
- Sarah Bryant (1981–2008), first British servicewoman killed in Afghanistan
- Gary O'Donnell (1968–2008), bomb disposal expert, GM recipient
- Michael Lockett (1980–2009), first posthumous MC recipient since Falklands War
- Olaf Schmid (1979–2009), GC recipient
- Rupert Thorneloe (1969–2009), highest ranking Army officer killed in action since Falklands War, in Afghanistan
- Lisa Head (1981–2011), first female bomb disposal officer killed in action
- James Ashworth (1989–2012), VC recipient
- Stephen Healey (1982–2012), former Swansea City footballer
