= Ivor Gillett =

Recipient of the George Cross

Ivor John Gillett
- Born: 16 September 1928
- Died: 26 March 1950 (aged 21); Seletar, Singapore
- Military career
- Allegiance: United Kingdom
- Branch: Royal Air Force
- Rank: Aircraftman 1st Class
- Awards: George Cross

Ivor John Gillett, GC (16 September 1928 – 26 March 1950) was a British airman and a recipient of the George Cross. Serving with the Far East Flying Boat Wing of the Royal Air Force, Gillett was posthumously awarded the George Cross for the gallantry he displayed on 26 March 1950 following an explosion on board a Sunderland flying boat.

== George Cross ==
Gillett was on board a Sunderland flying boat that exploded at its moorings in Seletar on 26 March 1950. The plane sank quickly and Gillett was thrown a life belt by rescuers on a launch. He selflessly threw the belt to an injured corporal, whom the rescue team had not spotted, and the belt kept the man afloat until he was rescued. The corporal had by then lost consciousness and would otherwise have drowned. Gillett disappeared in the confusion and his body was discovered two days later. His citation, published in the London Gazette on 3 October 1950, read:

The KING has been graciously pleased to approve the posthumous award of the GEORGE CROSS to: –

3500148 Aircraftman 1st Class Ivor John GILLETT, Royal Air Force, Far East Flying Boat Wing, Seletar.

Aircraftman Gillett, a Fitter Armourer, was a member of the ground crew on board a Sunderland Flying Boat which blew up at its moorings at R.A.F. Flying Boat Base, Seletar, on 26th March, 1950. Rescue surface craft were quickly on the scene but the aircraft and a bomb-scow alongside sank rapidly and survivors from the explosion were hurled into the water. A life-belt was thrown to Aircraftman Gillett from a rescue launch. He was seen, however, to throw the life-belt to a seriously injured corporal who was in danger of drowning near him. In the confusion the rescuers had not been able to reach the corporal. Gillett was a great friend of his and knew he was not a strong swimmer. The life-belt kept the corporal afloat until he was rescued unconscious from the water several minutes later. In the meantime Aircraftman Gillett disappeared; his body was washed ashore two days later. It was discovered that his body had suffered superficial injuries and that death was due to the combined effects of blast and drowning. By his action in deliberately saving the life of his injured friend, whilst injured and in great danger himself, Aircraftman Gillett displayed magnificent courage. His extreme unselfishness in his last living moments, which resulted in the sacrifice of his life to save another, was seen in this act of great heroism which was in accordance with the highest traditions of the Royal Air Force.
