= Ver-sur-Mer =

- Commune
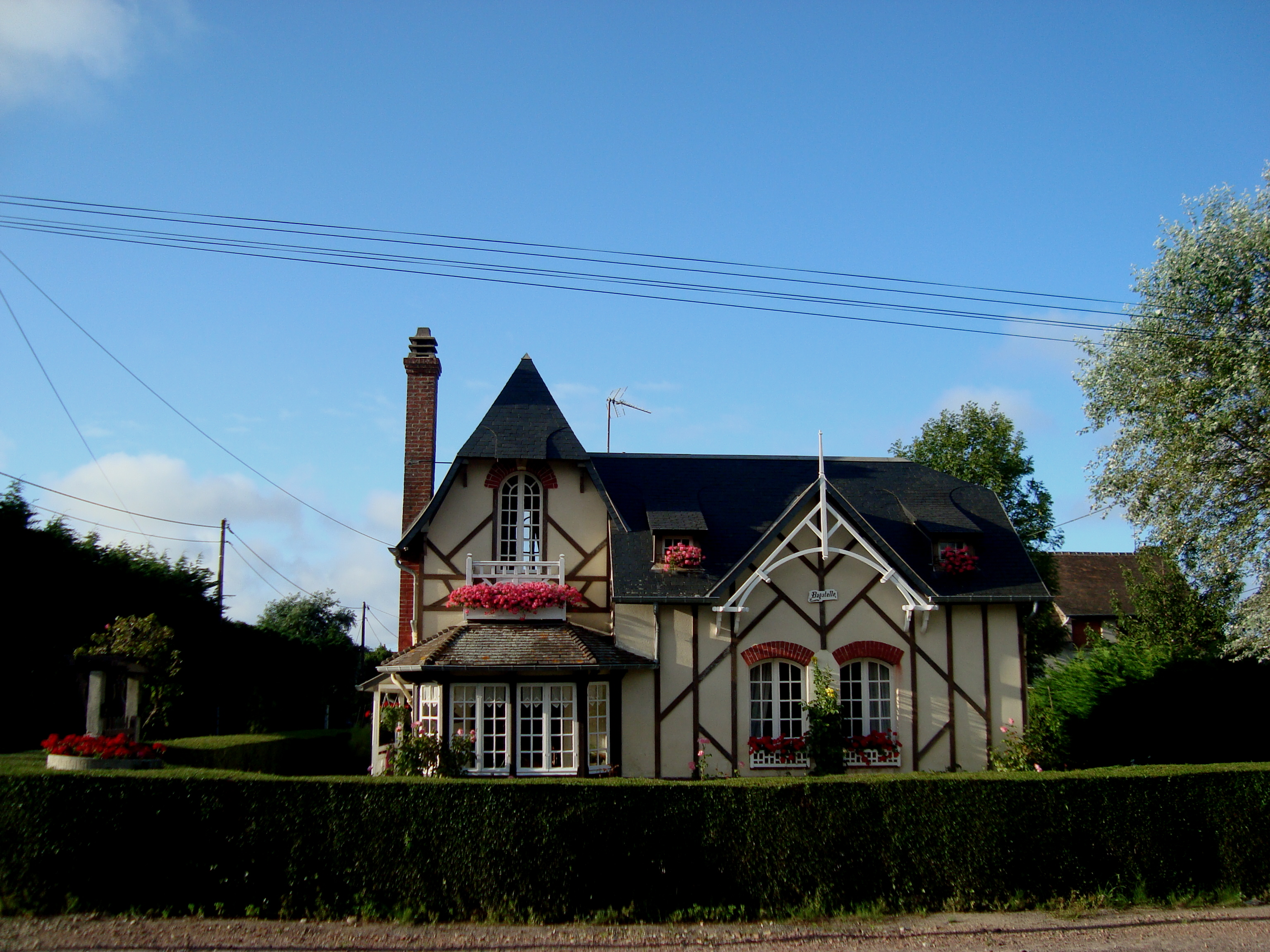
- A pre-war house in Ver-sur-Mer

- Coat of arms
- Location of Ver-sur-Mer
- Location within France Location within Normandy
- Coordinates: 49°19′55″N 0°31′42″W
- Country: France
- Region: Normandy
- Department: Calvados
- Arrondissement: Bayeux
- Canton: Courseulles-sur-Mer
- Intercommunality: CC Seulles Terre Mer

Government
  - Mayor (2024–2026): Lysiane Le Duc Drean
- Area^{1}: 9.01 km^{2} (3.48 sq mi)
- Elevation: 42 m (138 ft)
- Highest elevation: 56 m (184 ft)
- Lowest elevation: 0 m (0 ft)
- Population (2023): 1,581
  - Density: 175/km^{2} (454/sq mi)
- Time zone: UTC+01:00 (CET)
  - Summer (DST): UTC+02:00 (CEST)
- INSEE/Postal code: 14739 /14114
- ^{1} French Land Register data, which excludes lakes, ponds, glaciers > 1 km^{2} (0.386 sq mi or 247 acres) and river estuaries.

Ver-sur-Mer (French pronunciation: [vɛʁ syʁ mɛʁ], literally Ver on Sea) is a commune in the Calvados department and Normandy region of north-western France. It is situated at the eastern end of Gold Beach between Arromanches and Courseulles. The town lies 20 km north-west of Caen and 14 km north-east of Bayeux.

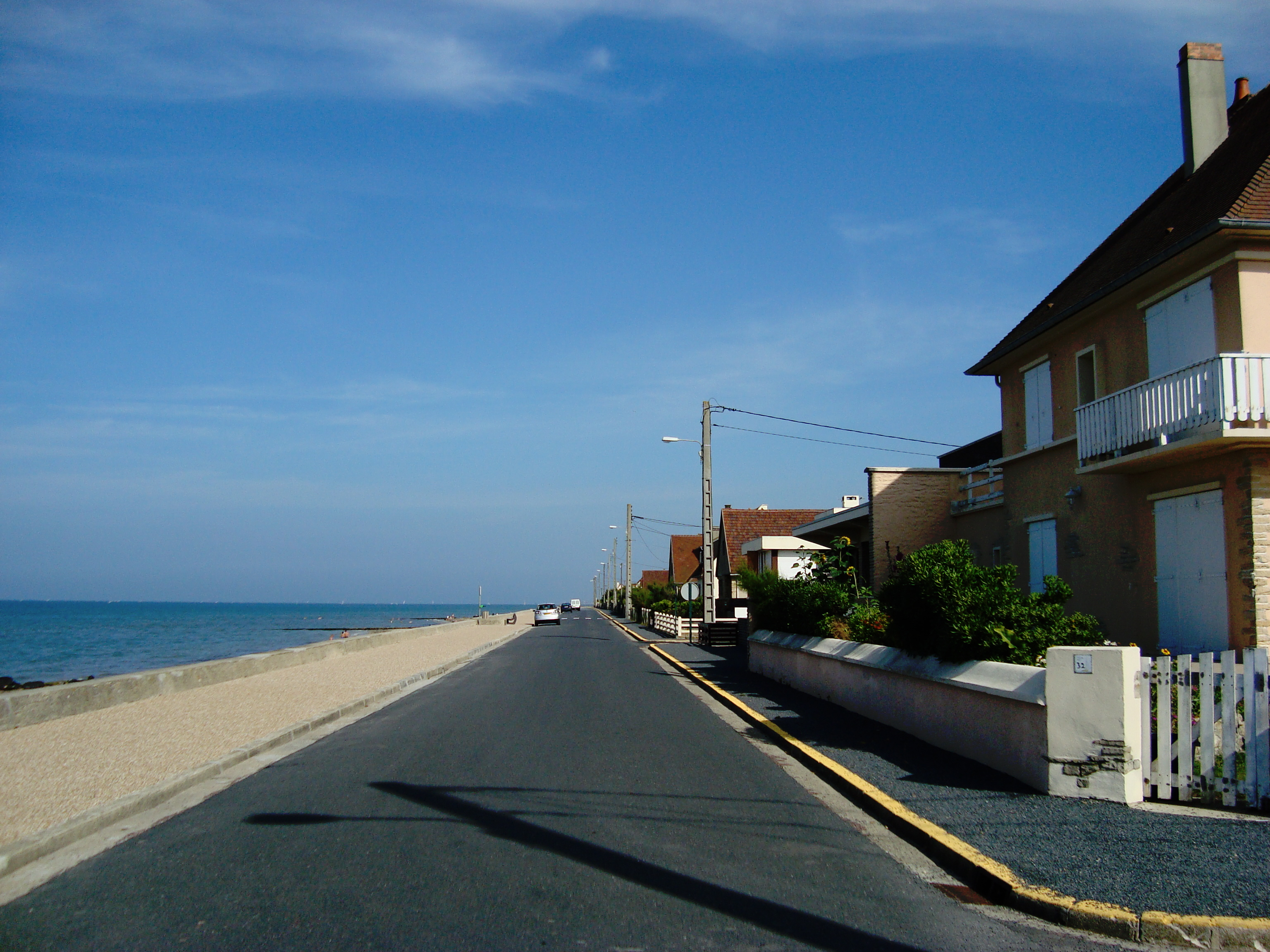
The seafront promenade (Boulevard de la Plage)

As well as its beach, the village has a bakery, pony club, sailing club, shrimp fishery, small supermarket, tennis court, and youth hostel. It is also home to the America Gold Beach Museum. Ver-sur-Mer lighthouse, still active today, was built in 1908 on the heights above the beach. During World War II, Canadian troops swiftly seized the lighthouse; however, it was badly damaged and had to be restored after the end of the war.

Ver-sur-Mer's church, which was constructed between the 10th and 12th centuries, is dedicated to Saint Martin.

== Population ==
Historical population
Year	Pop.	±% p.a.
1968	580	—
1975	701	+2.74%
1982	966	+4.69%
1990	1,359	+4.36%
1999	1,307	−0.43%
2007	1,536	+2.04%
2012	1,578	+0.54%
2017	1,625	+0.59%
2023	1,581	−0.46%
Source: INSEE

== History ==
=== Richard Evelyn Byrd ===
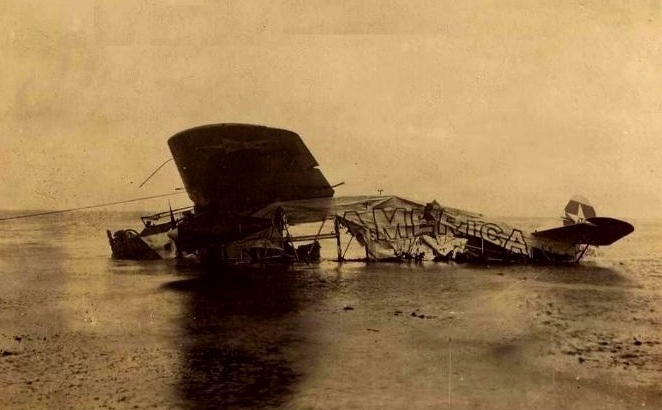
The wreckage of Byrd's aircraft

On 1 July 1927, Commander Richard Evelyn Byrd was forced to crash land his plane, America, in the sea off Ver-sur-Mer after his attempt at the first mail-carrying flight across the Atlantic failed.

=== D-Day ===
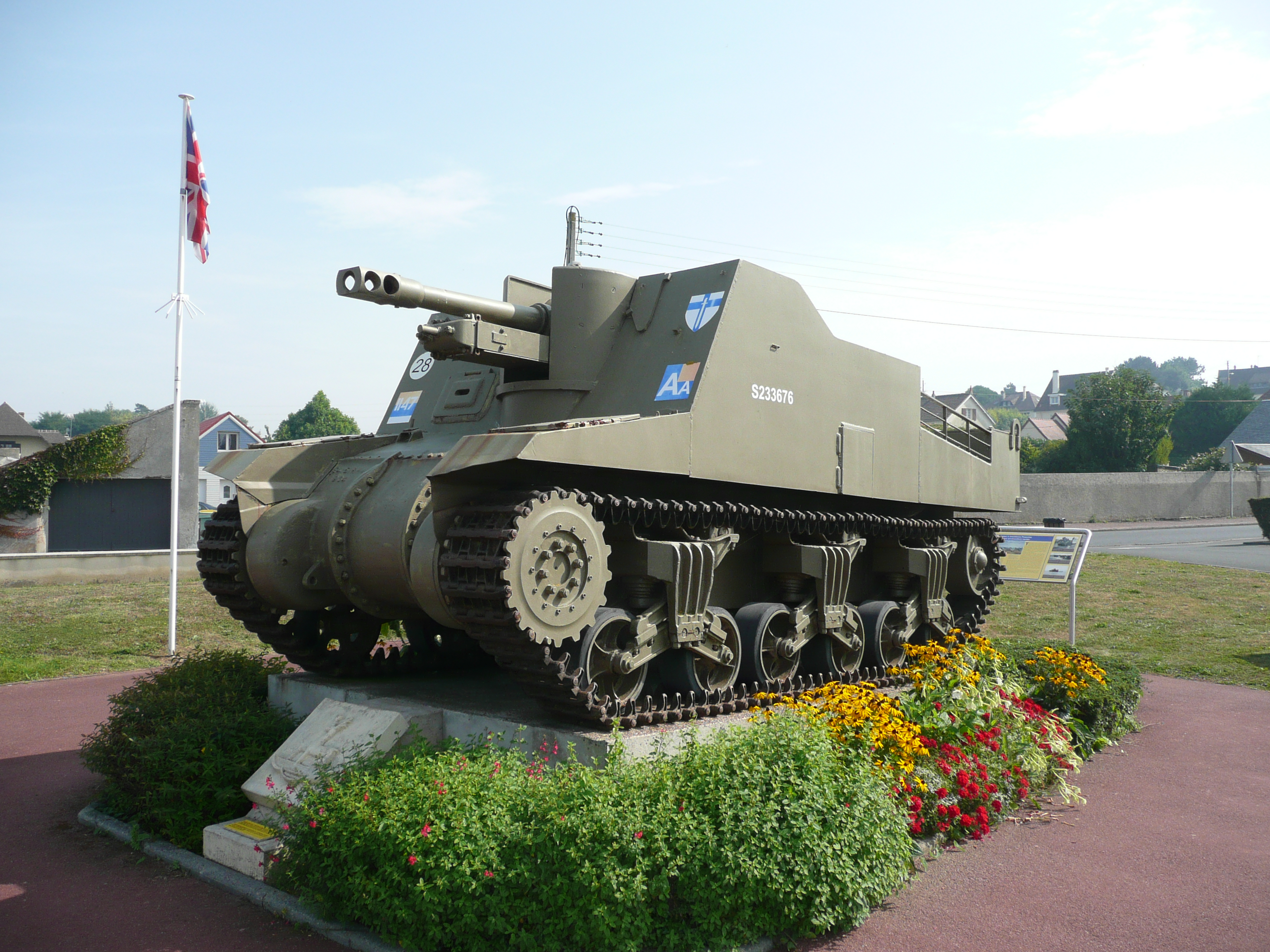
Sexton self-propelled 25-pounder gun on display at Ver-sur-Mer

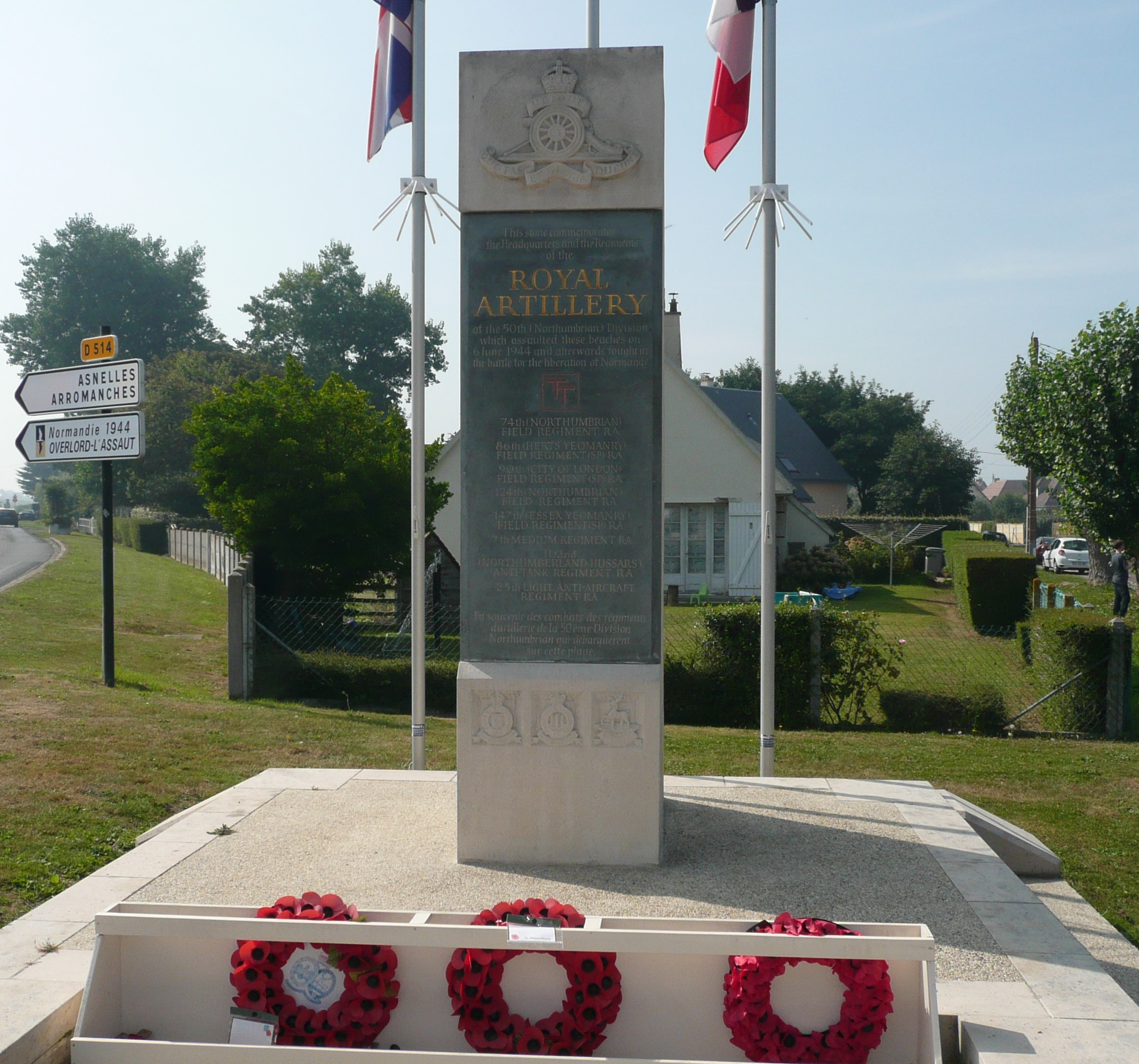
Royal Artillery Monument

On 6 June 1944, D-Day, the British 50th Infantry Division landed at Ver-sur-Mer as part of the Normandy Landings invasion, Operation Overlord. In 2021, the British Commonwealth of Nations soldiers who participated in the landing were commemorated with British Normandy Memorial near the village.

== See also ==
- Communes of the Calvados department
