= William James Lanyon Smith =

New Zealand naval officer (1922–2018)

Commander William James Lanyon Smith DSO OBE
- Born: 1 December 1922; Gore, New Zealand
- Died: 2 December 2018 (aged 96); Wellington, New Zealand
- Military career
- Allegiance: New Zealand
- Branch: Royal New Zealand Navy
- Service years: 1944–69
- Rank: Commander
- Commands: HMNZS Shackleton; HMNZS Lachlan
- Conflicts: World War II
- Awards: Distinguished Service Order; Officer of the Order of the British Empire

William James Lanyon Smith DSO OBE (1 December 1922 – 2 December 2018) was a New Zealand naval officer. He served in the Royal New Zealand Naval Volunteer Reserve during World War II and was second-in-command of a midget submarine during an attack in Singapore codenamed Operation Struggle, for which he was appointed a Companion of the Distinguished Service Order.

== Early life ==
Smith was born in Gore, New Zealand, on 1 December 1922 and became a school teacher.

== Second World War ==
During World War II, Smith was a member of the Royal New Zealand Naval Volunteer Reserve. In May 1944 he was posted to the Royal Navy's midget submarine base at Port Bannatyne in Scotland and he became a temporary sub-lieutenant in September 1944. He served on the ‘X’ craft midget submarine depot ship HMS Bonaventure from December 1944 to April 1946.

On 31 July 1945 in the Straits of Johor, Singapore, Smith was second-in-command of an improved X-boat, HMS XE-3, that attacked the Japanese heavy cruiser Takao, after making a long and hazardous journey through mined waters. He manned the hydroplanes throughout the 17½-hour mission. In command of the submarine was Lieutenant Ian Fraser; the two other members of the crew were Acting Leading Seaman James Magennis, the diver who attached the limpet mines to the Takao, and Engine Room Artificer Third Class Charles Alfred Reed, who was at the wheel.

Following the attack on the Takao, Smith was appointed a Companion of the Distinguished Service Order. His citation, published in a supplement to the London Gazette dated 13 November 1945, read:

For gallantry, great skill and endurance whilst at the controls of His Majesty's Submarine XE-3 for over sixteen hours during her successful attack on a heavy Japanese cruiser in the Johore Strait, Singapore, on 31st July, 1945.

Reed received the Conspicuous Gallantry Medal, while Magennis and Fraser were both awarded the Victoria Cross. Smith was promoted to temporary lieutenant in December 1945.

== Post-war naval career ==
In June 1946, Smith transferred to the Royal New Zealand Navy with the rank of lieutenant. Between 1947 and 1953 he served successively on HMNZS Bellona, HMNZS Hawea and HMNZS Lachlan. In February 1953 he was posted to HMNZS Maori as her executive officer, and in May that year was promoted to the rank of lieutenant commander.

From November 1955 until 1957 he was stationed at the navy office in Wellington (HMNZS Wakefield), and then he served as commanding officer of HMNZS Shackleton. In December 1959, Smith was promoted to the rank of commander, and from February 1960 until October 1962 he served as commanding officer of HMNZS Lachlan and hydrographer of the Royal New Zealand Navy. Thereafter he was director of hydrography at HMNZS Wakefield.

In the 1968 Queen's Birthday Honours, Smith was appointed an Officer of the Order of the British Empire.

Smith died in Wellington on 2 December 2018.

== Honorific eponym ==
The Royal New Zealand Navy's headquarters for its operational diving team, maritime operations evaluation team and diving school are housed in the Commander William Smith Building—named in Smith's honour and officially opened by him in 2006—at the Devonport Naval Base in Auckland.
