= HMS Bonaventure (F139) =

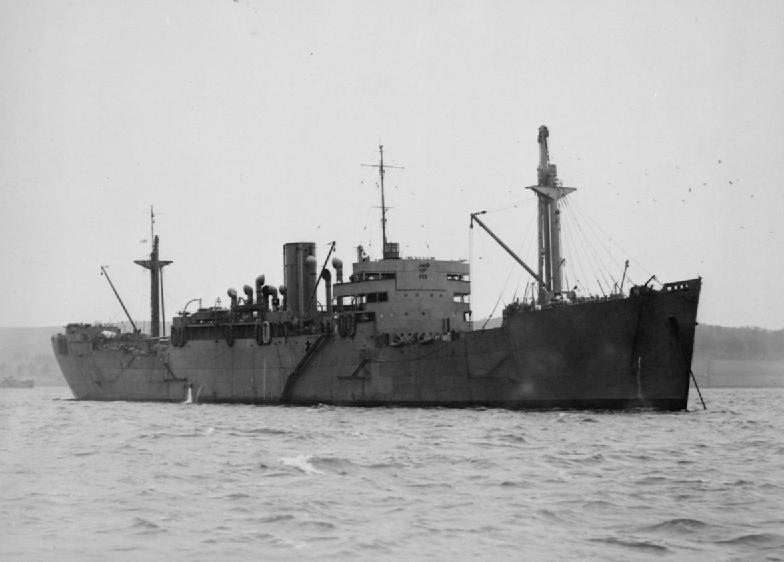
- HMS Bonaventure at anchor in February 1943

History

United Kingdom
- Name: HMS Bonaventure
- Builder: Greenock & Grangemouth Dockyard Company Greenock, Scotland; Converted at Scotts Shipbuilding and Engineering Company
- Launched: 27 October 1942
- Commissioned: 26 January 1943
- Recommissioned: 22 January 1945
- Out of service: Returned to Clan Line on 23 March 1948
- Identification: Pennant number F139
- Fate: Scrapped from 25 December 1963
- Badge: On a Field Barry wavy of 6 white and blue: within a horse shoe inverted Gold, a Griffin red.

General characteristics
- Class & type: Cameron-class steamship modified to submarine depot ship
- Displacement: 10,423 tons; later 8,067 tons
- Length: 487 ft (148 m)
- Beam: 63 ft (19 m)
- Draught: 30 ft (9.1 m)
- Propulsion: 2 x steam triple expansion and exhaust turbine
- Speed: 16 knots (30 km/h)
- Armament: 2 × 4 in (102 mm) AA guns; 12 × 20 mm (0.79 in) AA guns

HMS Bonaventure was a submarine depot ship of the Royal Navy. She was initially built for civilian service with the Clan Line, but on the outbreak of the Second World War she was requisitioned by the Navy and after being launched, was converted for military service.

== Career ==
=== Construction and commissioning ===
The ship was laid down at the yards of the Greenock & Grangemouth Dockyard Company, of Greenock, Scotland as a Clan Line Cameron-class steamship. She was provisionally allocated the name Clan Campbell. With the outbreak of war, Admiralty requisitioned her for the Royal Navy, and after her launch on 27 October 1942, she was converted at the yards of Scotts Shipbuilding and Engineering Company to become a submarine depot ship for the X-class midget submarines. After the conversion was completed she was commissioned into the Navy on 26 January 1943.

=== Early wartime service ===
After completing work-up trials, Bonaventure sailed to Loch Striven on the west bank of the Clyde to become the main training base and depot ship for the X craft midget submarines. In August and September 1943, training and trials were carried out for the midget submarines HMS X5, X6, X7, X8, X9 and X10. They were to be used to carry out the attack on the German battleship Tirpitz in Altenfjord, Norway, codenamed Operation Source.

During the operation, the submarines HMS Thrasher, Truculent, Stubborn, Syrtis, Sceptre and Sea Nymph each towed a midget submarine to Norwegian waters. Despite a number of the X craft being lost, the operation was a success and Tirpitz was put out of action for six months. In October Bonaventure sailed to Govan to be refitted at the yards of Alexander Stephen and Sons. The refit took until 2 January 1944 and included fitting new radar equipment. Some work was not completed before Bonaventure was recommissioned on 22 January to serve with the British Pacific Fleet. She again deployed at Loch Striven in preparation. She remained deployed there until March, when she returned to Govan to complete the outstanding dockyard work. The refit lasted until August, when after post-refit trials, she returned to Loch Striven in September. October to November was spent training on the loch. During this period, the modified XE-class submarines, which had been under construction since January 1944, became available. Several were embarked aboard Bonaventure for use against targets in the Far East. In December she was nominated for deployment as the depot ship for the 14th Submarine Flotilla in the south west Pacific.

=== Pacific theatre ===
Bonaventure's departure was initially delayed, and in January she embarked six XE type submarines. She left the United Kingdom on 21 February, sailing for Australia via the Panama Canal. After going through the canal, she crossed the Pacific, arriving at Pearl Harbor on 7 March. The attitude of the United States Navy was discouraging, and the use of midget submarines was not looked on with much enthusiasm. Bonaventure arrived at Brisbane on 27 April and received approval to move nearer to the operational area and to approach the local US Navy authorities. She subsequently sailed to Townsville, Queensland in May, where a visit was made by a senior officer of the 14th Flotilla to the US Navy Base at Subic Bay. The Americans remained skeptical and suggested that Bonaventure be converted to perform a wider support role. On 31 May the proposal was made to use midget submarines to cut Japanese underwater telegraph cables.

Bonaventure was transferred to Hervey Bay, Queensland in June, and then to an area south of Townsville, to prepare for the cable cutting operations. She carried out extensive training and experiments off the coast of Mon Repos using a disused telegraph cable between Australia and New Caledonia. During these exercises, two divers (Lt Bruce Enzer and Lt Bruce Carey) died after suffering oxygen poisoning. After the operational targets had been selected, Bonaventure sailed to Labuan, Borneo. Throughout July she prepared for three operations. Operation Struggle aimed to place limpet mines on the Japanese cruisers Myōkō and Takao, based at Singapore with the 10th Fleet. Operation Foil aimed to cut telegraph cables off Lamma Island, Hong Kong, and Operation Sabre was intended to cut telegraph cables at Cap St Jacques, off Saigon. These cables were vital to Japanese signal security as radio signals could be deciphered by US code breakers.

The operations began on 26 July. HMS Stygian towed XE3 and HMS Spark towed XE1 for Operation Struggle. Takao was badly damaged, sinking to the seabed, but the attack on Myōkō failed. For Operation Sabre, HMS Spearhead towed XE4, which succeeded in cutting two cables and bringing sections back to Bonaventure. Operation Foil was undertaken with HMS Maidstone, based at Subic Bay, as the depot ship. HMS Selene towed XE5, but the tow failed part way through the voyage. XE5 was able to reach the target under her own power and succeeded in severing the cable. The submarines returned in tow to Bonaventure on 3, 4 and 5 August. Bonaventure's last activity before the end of the war was to sail to Sydney from Labuan on 20 August.

== Postwar ==
Bonaventure returned to the UK, and remained in Royal Navy service for a further three years. She was placed on the disposal list in 1948, and sold back to the Clan Line on 23 March 1948. She was converted back to mercantile use, and re-entered service as Clan Davidson. She was sold in 1963 and arrived at Hong Kong for scrapping on 25 December 1963.
