= X-class submarine =

Midget submarine class built for the Royal Navy during 1943–44

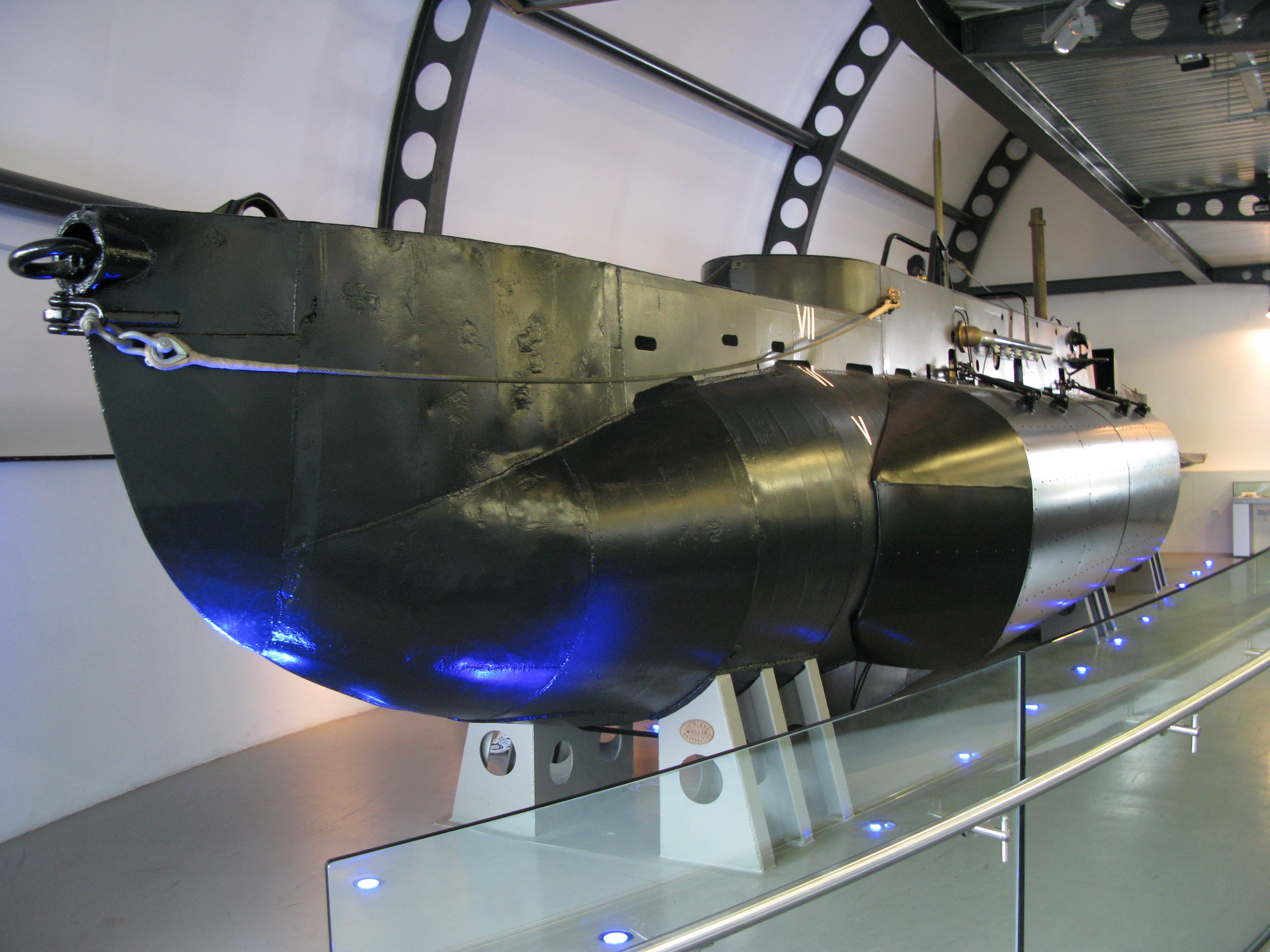
- X24 on display at the Royal Navy Submarine Museum, Gosport, Hampshire

Class overview
- Name: X class
- Operators: Royal Navy
- Preceded by: V class
- Succeeded by: XE class
- Subclasses: X3, X4, X5-10, X20-25, XT
- Completed: 20
- Lost: 7 (5 scuttled, 1 foundered, 1 collision)
- Preserved: 1

General characteristics (X class)
- Type: midget submarine
- Displacement: 27 tons surfaced; 30 tons submerged
- Length: 51.25 ft (15.62 m)
- Beam: 5.75 ft (1.75 m)
- Draught: 5.3 ft (1.60 m)
- Propulsion: Single shaft; 1 × Gardner 4LK 4-cyl diesel engine, 42 hp (31.3 kW) at 1,800 rpm; 1 × Keith Blackman electric motor, 30 hp (22.3 kW) at 1,650 rpm
- Speed: 6.5 knots (12.0 km/h) surfaced; 5.5 knots (10.2 km/h) submerged
- Range: 500 nmi (926 km) surfaced; 82 nmi (151.8 km) @2 knots (2 mph; 4 km/h) submerged
- Test depth: 300 ft (91.5 m)
- Complement: 4
- Armament: 2 × 4,400 lb detachable amatol charges

The X class was a World War II midget submarine class built for the Royal Navy during 1943–44. It was substantially larger than the original Chariot manned torpedo.

Known individually as X-Craft, the vessels were designed to be towed to their intended area of operations by a full-size "mother" submarine – usually one of the T class or S class – with a passage crew on board, the operational crew being transferred from the towing submarine to the X-Craft by dinghy when the operational area was reached, and the passage crew returning with the dinghy to the towing submarine. Once the attack was over, the X-Craft would rendezvous with the towing submarine and then be towed home.

Range was limited primarily by the endurance and determination of their crews, but was thought to be up to 14 days in the craft or 1,000 nmi (1,900 km), after suitable training. Actual range of the X-Craft itself was 600 nmi (1,100 km) surfaced and 80 nmi (150 km) at 2 knots (3.7 km/h) submerged.

== Specification ==
The craft was about 51 ft (16 m) long, 5.5 ft (1.7 m) maximum diameter and displaced 27 long tons (27 t) surfaced and 30 long tons (30 t) submerged. Propulsion was by a 4-cylinder Gardner 4LK 42 hp diesel engine, converted from a type used in London buses, and a 30 hp electric motor, giving a maximum surface speed of 6.5 knots (12.0 km/h; 7.5 mph) and a submerged speed of about one third of that. The crew initially numbered three – commander, pilot and ERA (Engine Room Artificer, i.e. engineer), but soon a specialist diver was added, for whom an airlock, known as a "wet and dry" compartment, was provided. The ERA, usually a Navy Chief Petty Officer, operated and maintained the machinery in the vessel.

The weapons on the "X-Craft" were two side-cargoes – explosive charges held on opposite sides of the hull with two tons of amatol in each. The intention was to drop these on the sea bed underneath the target and then escape. The charges were detonated by a time fuse. The craft were fitted with electromagnetic field generators to mask their inherent magnetic field to avoid detection by anti-submarine detectors on the sea bed and also with sonar and a periscope.

== Service ==
A number of development craft were built before it was felt that a feasible weapon had been produced. The first operational craft was X3 (or HM S/M X.3), launched on the night of 15 March 1942. Training with the craft began in September 1942, with X4 arriving in October. In December 1942 and January 1943, six of the "5-10" class began to arrive, identical externally but with a completely reworked interior.

These operations were part of a longer series of frogman operations; see human torpedo.

The operational base and training establishment was HMS Varbel at the former Kyles Hydro Hotel at Port Bannatyne on the Isle of Bute in the Firth of Clyde, Scotland.

=== Major operations ===
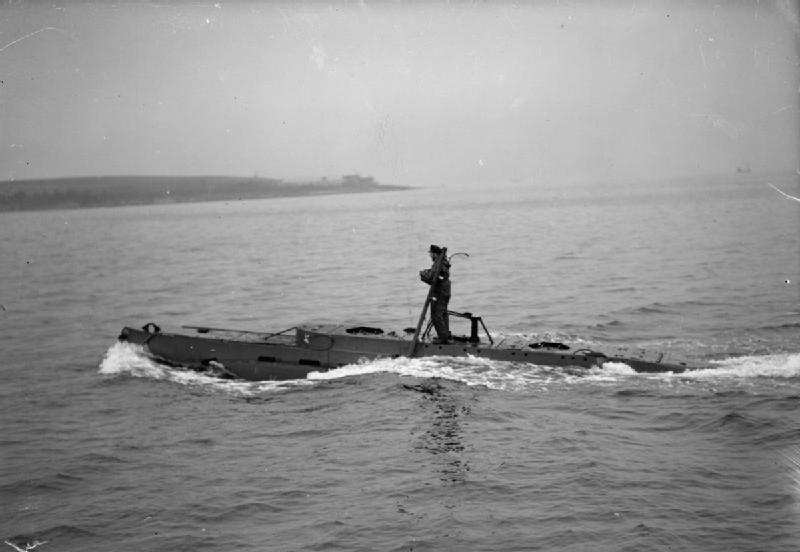
X25 underway

Their first deployment was Operation Source in September 1943, an attempt to neutralise the heavy German warships based at Kåfjord, near Norway's North Cape. Six X-Craft were used, but only two successfully laid charges (under the German battleship Tirpitz). Two were lost while being towed to Norway: X8 began taking water and was scuttled, and X9 sank with her crew after the towline parted. Only X6 and X7, commanded by Lieutenant Donald Cameron and Lieutenant Godfrey Place respectively, were successful in placing their charges, although their crews were captured (there is some evidence that X5 also placed her charges; X10 also penetrated the anchorage but was unable to attack and the crew were picked up by another submarine). Tirpitz was badly damaged and remained out of action until May 1944. She was finally destroyed on 12 November 1944 by Avro Lancaster bombers, during Operation Catechism.

For this action, Cameron and Place were awarded the Victoria Cross, whilst Robert Aitken, Richard Haddon Kendall, and John Thornton Lorimer received the Distinguished Service Order and Edmund Goddard the Conspicuous Gallantry Medal. The commander of X8, John Elliott Smart, was appointed a Member of the Order of the British Empire (MBE). There was a possibility that X5 had also successfully planted explosive side charges before being destroyed, but this was never conclusively proven; its commander Henty-Creer was not awarded a medal, but was mentioned in dispatches.

The lost boats were replaced early in 1944 with X20 to X25 and six training-only craft.

Submarines X20 to X25 were dispatched to Bergen, Norway. On 15 April 1944, in Operation Guidance X24 attacked the Laksevåg floating dock. X22 was intended for the mission, but had been accidentally rammed during training and sunk with all hands. X24 made the approach and escaped successfully, but the charges were placed under Bärenfels, a 7,569-gross register ton (GRT) merchant vessel alongside the dock; the ship was sunk but the dock suffered only minor damage. On 11 September the operation was repeated by X24; this time she succeeded in sinking the dock.

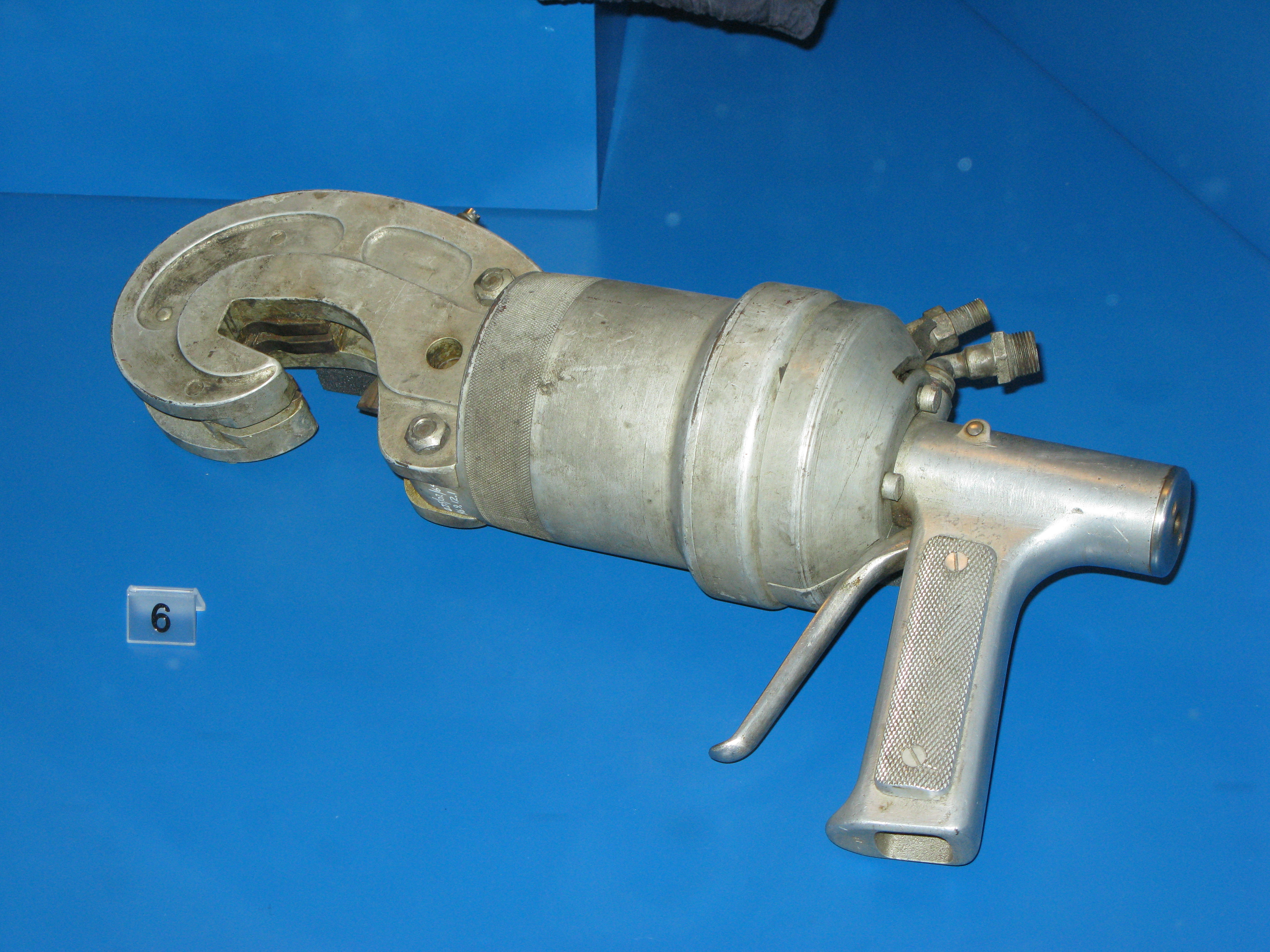
A hand-held, hydraulically powered, net cutter of the type used by X boat divers to cut through torpedo nets protecting harbours

X-Craft were involved in the preparatory work for Overlord. Operation Postage Able was planned to take surveys of the landing beaches with X20, commanded by Lt KR Hudspeth, spending four days off the French coast. Periscope reconnaissance of the shoreline and echo-soundings were performed during daytime. Each night, X20 would approach the beach and 2 divers would swim ashore. Soil samples were collected in condoms. The divers went ashore on two nights to survey the beaches at Vierville-sur-Mer, Moulins St Laurent and Colleville-sur-Mer in what became the American Omaha Beach. On the third night, they were due to go ashore off the Orne Estuary (Sword Beach), but by this stage fatigue (the crew and divers had been living on little more than benzedrine tablets) and the worsening weather caused Hudspeth to shorten the operation, returning to Dolphin on 21 January 1944. Hudspeth received a bar to his DSC.

X20 and X23, each with a crew of five, acted as navigational beacons to help the D-Day invasion fleet land on the correct beaches (Operation Gambit), as part of the Combined Operations Pilotage Parties. The craft were also equipped with a radio beacon and echo sounder to help direct Canadian and British ships to the suitable positions on Sword and Juno beaches. Oxygen bottles on both craft enabled the crews to remain submerged for extended periods during this operation, 64 hours of the 76 total hours at sea.

=== Legacy ===
The only remaining intact example of an X-Craft, X24, was transferred from HMS Dolphin, where she had been on display since 1981, to the Royal Navy Submarine Museum nearby in 1987. Operations continued in the Far East with the revised XE class submarines.

== X-craft and crews ==
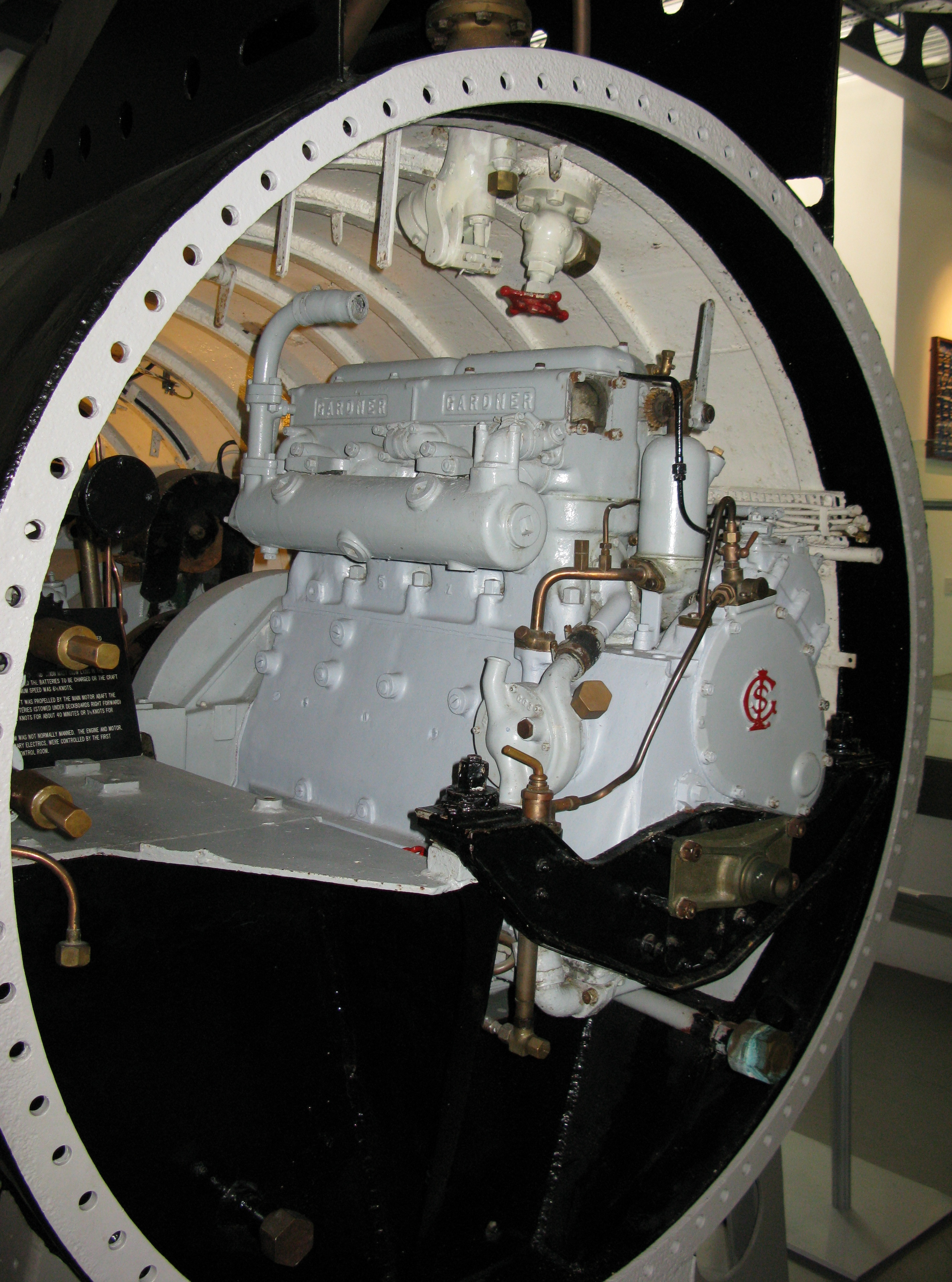
The engine of X24

- X3 – unofficially named Piker 1, was lost on 4 November 1942 in Loch Striven due to a leaking engine valve. All crew escaped by utilizing their Davis Submerged Escape Apparatus.
- X5 – unofficially named Platypus, commanded by Lt. Henty-Creer RNVR (also the operation's commander), crew S-Lt. Nelson, Midshipman Malcolm, and ERA Mortiboys; passage crew Lt Terry-Lloyd (commanding), L/S Element, Stoker Garrity. Henty-Creer, Nelson, Malcolm, and Mortiboys were killed in the attack, though X5's exact fate is unknown.
- X6 – named Piker II, commanded by Lt. Donald Cameron, crew Lt. J. T. Lorimer, S-Lt. R. Kendall, and ERA Goddard; passage crew Lt Wilson (commanding), Leading Seaman McGregor, Stoker Oxley. Cameron earned a VC, Lorimer and Kendall DSOs, Goddard a Conspicuous Gallantry Medal.
- X7 – unofficially named Pdinichthys, commanded by Lt. Basil C. G. Place, crew S-Lt. R. Aitken, Lt. Whittam, and ERA Whitley; passage crew Lt Philip (commanding), Leading Seaman J. Magennis, Stoker Luck. Vessel was scuttled immediately following the Tirpitz attack, but only Place escaped before she sank. Aitken escaped from the bottom of the fjord, but Whittam and Whitley were unable to escape before their air gave out. Place also earned a VC, Aitken a DSO, while Philip earned an MBE;
- X8 – unofficially named Expectant, commanded by Lt. McFarlane RAN (Lt. Smart was passage crew commander)
- X9 – unofficially named Pluto, commanded by Lt. EA Kearon RNVR; AH Harte (Able Seaman) and GH Hollet (Stoker). Foundered on 16 September 1942 while under tow from the Syrtis.
- X10 – unofficially named Excalibur, commanded by Lt. Hudspeth RANVR

The depot ship for X craft was HMS Bonaventure.

== Builders ==
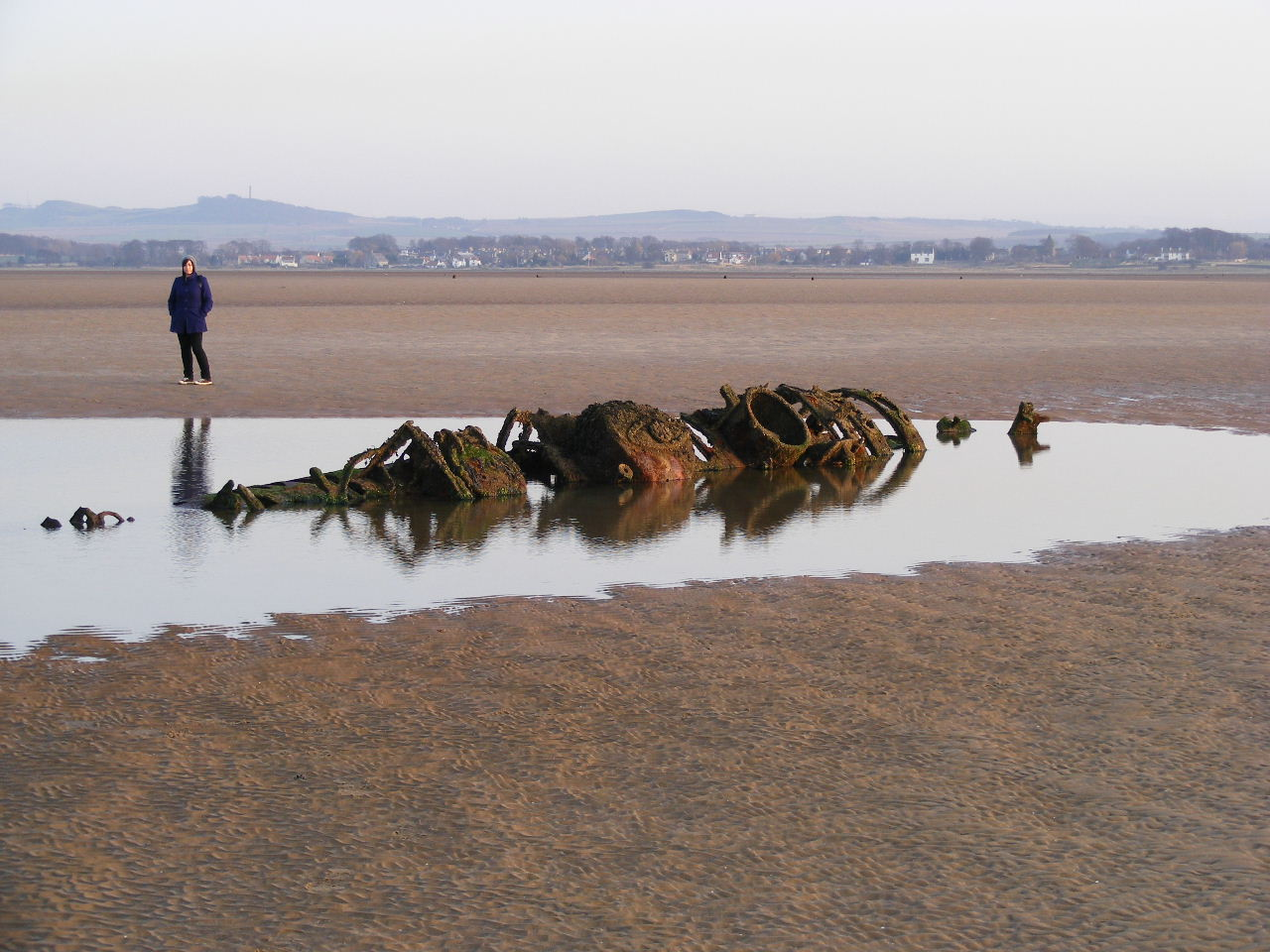
The remains of an XT-class craft on the beach at Aberlady Bay, east of Edinburgh, in 2008. The bow is to the left, the stern to the right. From left to right can be seen the wet and dry chamber hatch, the "conning tower" (the periscopes penetrated the hull through the "eye" shape) and the secondary hatch.

The numbering sequence of the X class began with X3 because the designations X1 and X2 had already been used previously – X1 had been a one-off submarine cruiser design from the 1920s while X2 had been assigned to a captured Italian submarine.

- Prototypes
  - X3 – built by Varley Marine, Hamble, scrapped 1945
  - X4 – built by Portsmouth Dockyard, scrapped 1945
- X5-type
  - X5 – built by Vickers Armstrong, Barrow-in-Furness, used in Operation Source, sunk Altenfjord, 22 September 1943
  - X6 – built by Vickers, used in Operation Source, scuttled Altenfjord, 22 September 1943
  - X7 – built by Vickers, used in Operation Source, scuttled Altenfjord, 22 September 1943, salved 1976 for museum restoration
  - X8 – built by Vickers, used in Operation Source, scuttled in North Sea, 17 September 1943
  - X9 – built by Vickers, used in Operation Source, foundered under tow in North Sea, 16 September 1943 with all hands
  - X10 – built by Vickers, used in Operation Source, scuttled in North Sea 3 October 1943
- X20-type
  - X20 – built by Broadbent, Huddersfield, used in Operation Postage Able (surveying Normandy beaches prior to invasion) and on Operation Gambit
  - X21 – built by Broadbent
  - X22 – built by Markham & Co., Chesterfield, collided with HMS Syrtis and lost with all hands while training, 7 February 1944
  - X23 – built by Markham, used on Operation Gambit, sold 1945
  - X24 – built by Marshall, Gainsborough, used on Operation Guidance (attacking Laksevåg floating dock at Bergen 15 April 1944) when the merchant ship Barenfels alongside the dock was sunk; the dock was attacked and sunk on Operation Heckle on 11 September 1944, again by X24 which was hulked 1945
  - X25 – built by Marshall, sold 1945
- Training craft
  - XT1 – built by Vickers, scrapped 1945
  - XT2 – built by Vickers, scrapped 1945
  - XT3 – built by Vickers, scrapped 1945
  - XT4 – built by Vickers, scrapped 1945
  - XT5 – built by Vickers, scrapped 1945
  - XT6 – built by Vickers, scrapped 1945

== Surviving examples ==
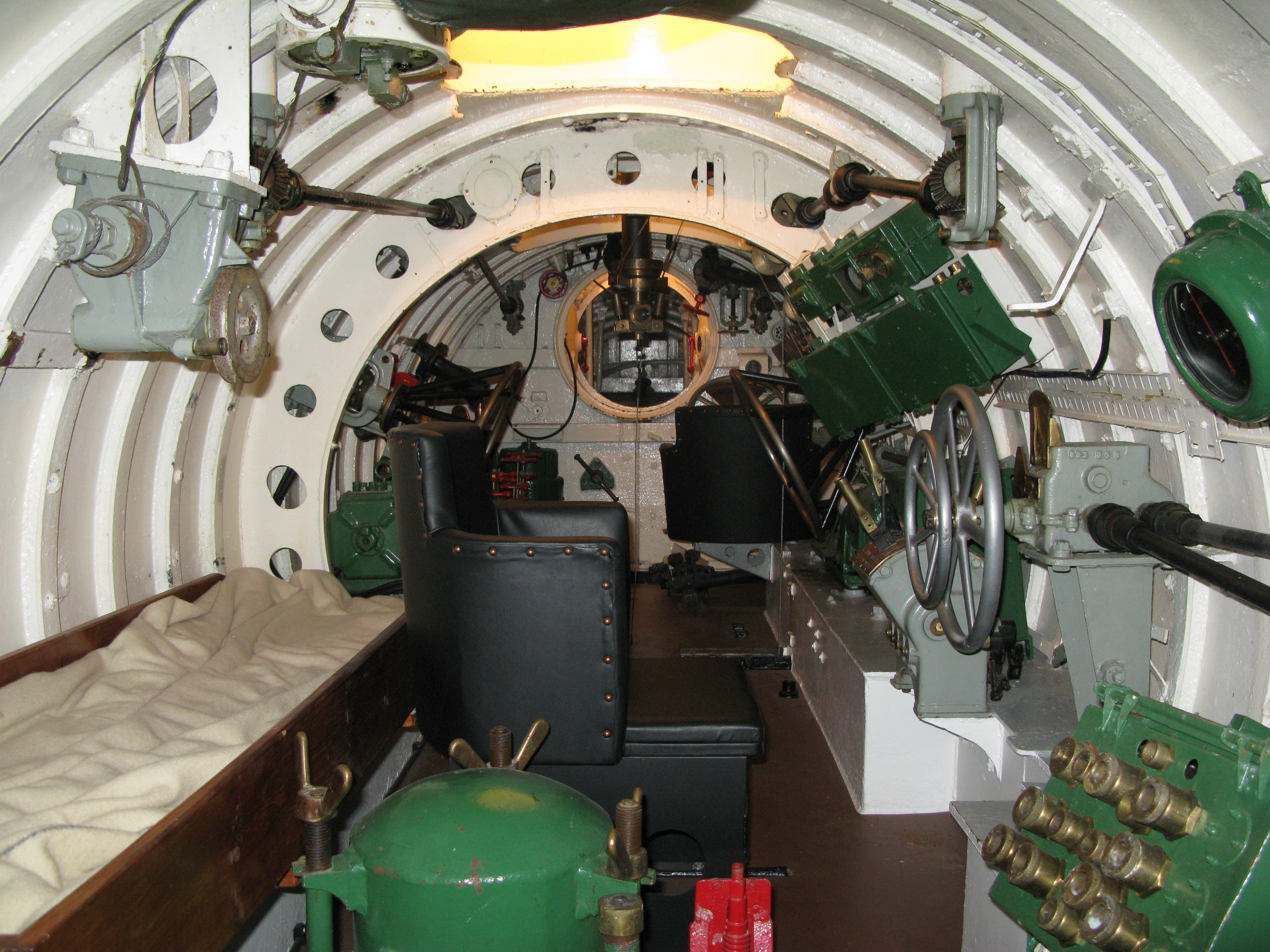
The interior of X24

- X24 – the only one to have seen combat and survive is at the Royal Navy Submarine Museum, Gosport
- X7 - sunk in Kaa Fjord, Norway following an engagement with the German battleship Tirpitz, the stern section of the submarine was recovered for study by the Germans. The bow and battery section were re-discovered in 1974, and salvaged in 1976. The wreckage is currently on display at the Imperial War Museum, London
- The remains of two XT-class craft are present on the beach at Aberlady Bay in East Lothian, Scotland. They were towed there in 1946 and moored to a large concrete block at the low tide level and were used as targets for aircraft. Much of the structure remains, semisubmerged in the sand, and can be reached at low spring tides.
- X51 Stickleback, a Stickleback-class of 1954, is on display at the Scottish Submarine Centre in Helensburgh, Scotland.

== In the media ==
This type of midget submarine was portrayed in the 1955 war film, Above Us the Waves, featuring John Mills, which was based on both Operation Source and the earlier Chariot attacks on the Tirpitz.

An X-class submarine – marked as "X2" – features in the 1959 film The Giant Behemoth (a.k.a. Behemoth the Sea Monster).

This class of submarine was later featured in the 1968 movie Submarine X-1 starring James Caan as a Canadian Royal Naval Volunteer Reserve officer who after losing his submarine and fifty crew members in a battle with a German ship during World War II, gets a second chance training crews to take part in a raid using midget subs.

A 1976 Douglas Reeman novel, Surface with Daring, features a fictionalized account of X-class midget submarines, especially XE-16 and its crew, performing several highly secret operations in occupied Europe.

A 2006 Alexander Fullerton novel, The Gatecrashers, features a fictionalized account of X-class midget submarines, including X-12 piloted by one of the protagonists, that lays explosive charges to damage the Tirpitz.

== See also ==
- HM Submarine X1 – World War 1 submarine.
- HM Submarine X2 – Name given to the Italian Submarine, Galileo Galilei, after she was captured and taken into service by the Royal Navy.

== Bibliography ==
- Above Us The Waves by C. E. T. Warren and James Benson - George G. Harrap & Co. LTD - 1953 - ISBN 1-84415-440-8
- Submarines in Colour by Bill Gunston - Blandford Colour Series - Blandford - 1976 - ISBN 0-7137-0780-1
- Submarines - The History and Evolution of Underwater Fighting Vessels by Antony Preston - Octopus Books - 1974 - ISBN 0-7064-0429-7
