= XE-class submarine =

1944 class of British midget submarines

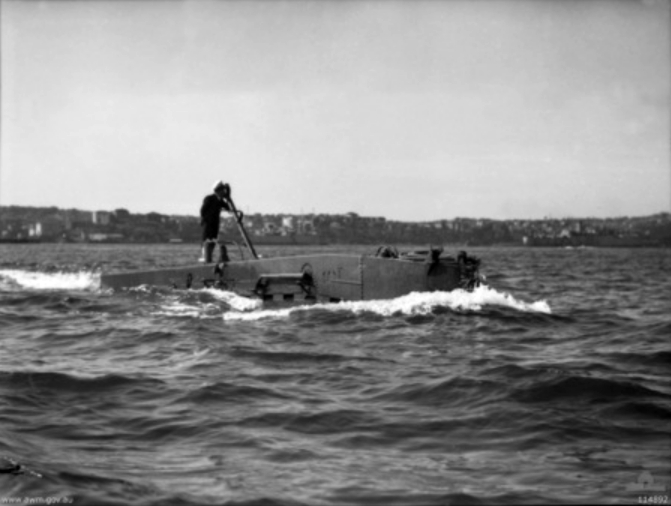
- XE4 in Sydney Harbour, 1945

Class overview
- Operators: Royal Navy
- Preceded by: X class
- Planned: 16
- Completed: 15
- Cancelled: 1
- Retired: 13
- Preserved: 2

General characteristics
- Displacement: 30.25 long tons (31 t) surfaced; 33.5 long tons (34 t) submerged
- Length: 53.25 ft (16.23 m)
- Beam: 5.75 ft (1.75 m)
- Draught: 5.3 ft (1.62 m)
- Propulsion: Single shaft; One Gardner 4-cyl diesel engine 42 hp (31 kW) at 1,800 rpm; One Keith Blackman electric motor 30 hp (22 kW) at 1,650 rpm
- Speed: 6.5 knots (12.0 km/h) surfaced; 5.5 knots (10.2 km/h) submerged
- Range: 500 nmi (930 km) surfaced; 82 nmi (151.9 km) at 2 knots (3.7 km/h) submerged
- Test depth: 300 ft (91 m)
- Complement: 4–5
- Armament: 2 × 4,400 lb (1,996 kg) detachable explosive charges; 6 × 20 lb (9 kg) limpet mines

The XE-class submarines were a series of twelve midget submarines that were built for the Royal Navy during 1944; four more to a slightly different design were built 1954–5 as the Stickleback class.

== Design ==
The XE had a crew of four, one lieutenant acting as the commander, a sub-lieutenant acting as the deputy, an engineer in charge of the mechanical aspects of the sub, as well as a seaman/leading seaman. Each submarine also contained at minimum one certified diver.

Each were armed with 2 side-charges, each with 2 tons (4,400 pounds) of Amatol explosives. Each also contained up to six 20-pound limpet mines. These were to be attached targets by a diver.

They and their depot ship HMS Bonaventure arrived at Labuan in July 1945. Four of them managed to take part in operations before the war ended.

== Operational history ==
=== Sabre and Foil ===
These operations, carried out in July 1945, were intended to cut the undersea telephone cables connecting Singapore, Saigon, Hong Kong and Tokyo. The intention was to oblige the Japanese to use radio and render themselves open to message interception.

Operation Sabre was directed at the Hong Kong to Saigon telephone cable, and carried out by XE4, which was towed to within 40 miles (64 km) of the Mekong Delta by the submarine HMS Spearhead, where she looked for the two telephone cables by using a towed grapnel. She eventually snagged the first cable, and managed to haul it about 10 feet (3.0 m) off the seabed. XE4's diver, Sub-Lieutenant K.M. Briggs, used the net/cable cutter to sever it. The second cable was soon found as well, and was severed by the second diver, Sub-Lieutenant A. Bergius. Two divers were carried due to the operating rule that a diver should not spend more than 20 minutes in depths over 33 feet (10 m) and no more than 10 minutes over 40 feet (12 m). XE4 and Spearhead returned to Labuan on 3 August 1945.

Operation Foil was directed at the Hong Kong to Singapore telephone cable and carried out by XE5 against the Hong Kong end of the cable, after being towed into position by the submarine HMS Selene. Operating close inshore near to Lamma Island, working conditions were poor, XE5's divers having to work in thick mud under the constant threat of oxygen poisoning. Despite repeated attempts it was not completely certain that the cable had in fact been severed, and it was not until after the Japanese surrender that it was confirmed that XE5 had succeeded in doing so. XE5 and Selene returned to Subic Bay on 6 August 1945.

=== Struggle ===
On 31 July 1945, HMS XE1 and XE3 executed a joint attack on Japanese warships within Singapore harbour. XE3 was tasked with mining the heavy cruiser Takao while XE1 was to attack the heavy cruiser Myōkō.

The approach of XE3 along the Straits of Johor and through the various harbour defences took 11 hours plus a further two hours to locate the camouflaged target. Despite several opportunities for Japanese defenders to spot the vessel, XE3 successfully reached the Takao, fixed limpet mines and dropped its two, 2-ton side charges. The withdrawal was successfully made and XE3 returned to HMS Stygian, her towing submarine. Meanwhile, XE1 was delayed by Japanese patrol craft, and her captain, realizing that he could not reach Myōkō (which was two miles further into the harbour than Takao) before the mines already laid by XE3 would explode, also elected to drop his own charges under Takao. XE1 also successfully returned to her towing submarine, HMS Spark.

The Takao, already damaged and not seaworthy, was severely damaged and never sailed again. XE3's commander, Lieutenant Ian Edward Fraser RNR, and diver Leading Seaman James Joseph Magennis were awarded the Victoria Cross (VC) for their part in the attack; whilst Sub-Lieutenant William James Lanyon Smith, RNZNVR, who was at the controls of XE3, received the Distinguished Service Order (DSO); Engine Room Artificer Third Class Charles Alfred Reed, who was at the wheel, received the Conspicuous Gallantry Medal (CGM). XE1's C/O, Lieutenant John Elliott Smart RNVR received the DSO, and Sub-Lieutenant Harold Edwin Harper, RNVR received the Distinguished Service Cross (DSC); and ERA Fourth Class Henry James Fishleigh and Leading Seaman Walter Henry Arthur Pomeroy received the Distinguished Service Medal. ERA Fourth Class Albert Nairn, Acting Leading Stoker Jack Gordan Robinson, and Able Seaman Ernest Raymond Dee were Mentioned in Despatches for their part in bringing the two midget submarines from harbour to the point where the crews that took part in the attack took over.

== Post war ==
In 1950 XE7 was loaned, along with its crew, to the US for testing.

== List of XE Craft ==
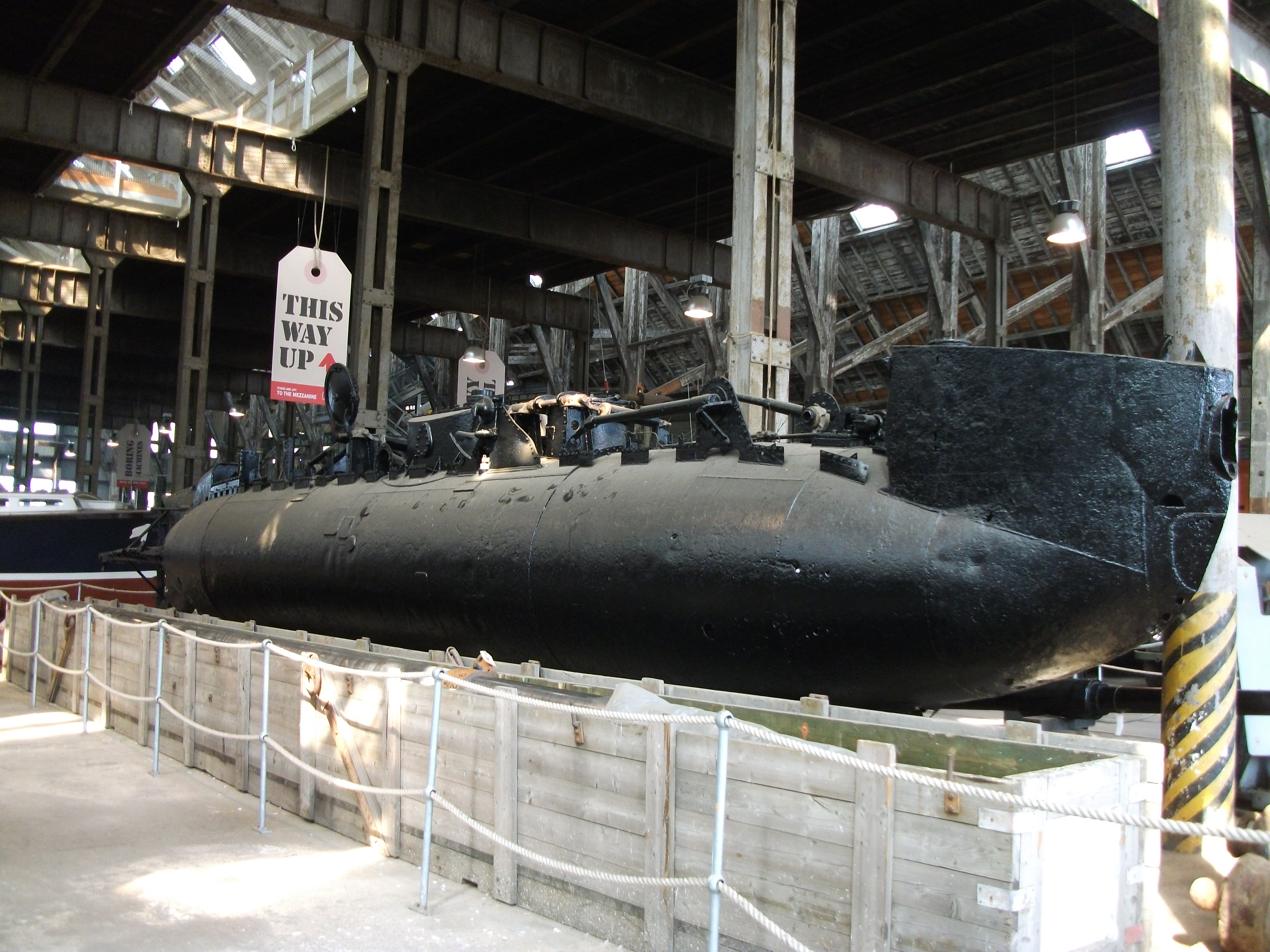
XE8 Expunger raised and now on display at Chatham Historic Dockyard

First group

- XE1 — built by Thomas Broadbent and Sons, used in Operation Struggle, scrapped 1945
- XE2 — built by Thomas Broadbent and Sons, scrapped 1945
- XE3 — built by Thomas Broadbent and Sons, used in Operation Struggle, scrapped 1945
- XE4 "Exciter" — built by Thomas Broadbent and Sons, used in Operation Sabre, scrapped 1945
- XE5 — built by Thomas Broadbent and Sons, used in Operation Foil, scrapped 1945
- XE6 — built by Thomas Broadbent and Sons, scrapped 1945
- XE7 — built by Thomas Broadbent and Sons, scrapped 1952
- XE8 "Expunger" — built by Broadbent, sunk as target 1952, recovered 1973 and preserved at Chatham Historic Dockyard, on loan from the Imperial War Museum
- XE9 — built by Markham, scrapped 1952
- XE10 — built by Markham, cancelled incomplete 1945

Second group

- XE11 — built by Marshall, collided with boom defence vessel in Loch Striven after drifting out of her exercise area and lost 6 March 1945. Three crew were killed in the accident but two managed to escape. The boat was later salvaged.
- XE12 — built by Marshall, cannibalised for spares 1952

Third group

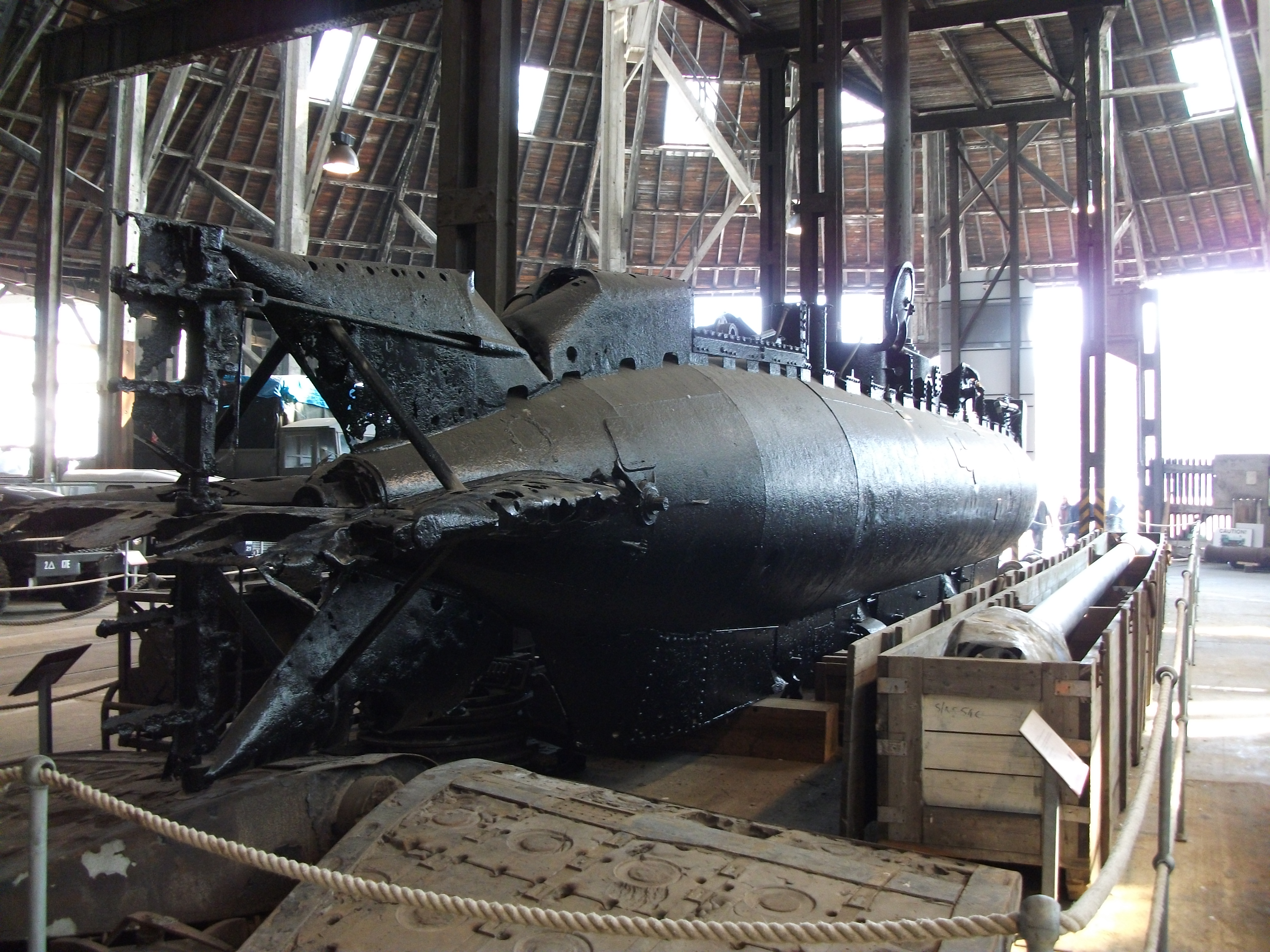
XE8 stern

with minor improvements, built 1954–5. See

- X51 Stickleback - to Swedish Navy as Spiggen. Now on display at Scottish Submarine Heritage Centre, Helensburgh.
- X52 Shrimp
- X53 Sprat - to United States Navy
- X54 Minnow

== In popular culture ==
Author Douglas Reeman featured XE craft in two of his novels, the 1961 Dive in the Sun and Surface with Daring published in 1976.
