= John Elliott Smart =

Royal Naval officer

- Nickname: Jack
- Born: 1 March 1916; Northumberland, England
- Died: 3 February 2008 (aged 91) Victoria, British Columbia, Canada
- Allegiance: United Kingdom
- Branch: Royal Navy
- Service years: 1938–1954
- Rank: Lieutenant Commander
- Commands: HMS X8 (1943); HMS XE1 (1945)
- Conflicts: Second World War
- Awards: Distinguished Service Order; Officer of the Order of the British Empire; Volunteer Reserve Decoration; Officer of the Legion of Merit (United States)

Lieutenant Commander John Elliott Smart DSO, OBE, VRD (1 March 1916 – 3 February 2008) was an officer in the Royal Navy, who commanded one of the midget submarines that attacked the German cruiser Lützow and the Japanese cruiser Takao during the Second World War.

== Early life ==
Smart was born on 1 March 1916 in Northumberland in England and joined the Royal Naval Volunteer Reserve (RNVR) in 1938, his commission as a sub-lieutenant was confirmed on 3 October 1939. He served the first part of the war in minesweepers in the eastern Mediterranean. He was promoted lieutenant on 1 March 1941, then joined HMS Varbel, the midget submarine training depot, in 1943.

== Operation Source ==
Six midget submarines were to take part in the attack on the German cruiser Lützow in Altenfjord, Norway. During the tow over to the attack, X8 lost contact with her towing submarine HMS Sea Nymph, but after 37 hours they regained contact. Unfortunately X8 developed leaks and was unable to dive, eventually leading to the X8 being scuttled. Smart was appointed a Member of the Order of the British Empire (MBE) for his part in the operation.

== Operation Struggle ==
The XE class submarines HMS XE1 and XE3 was assigned to Operation Struggle, an attack on the Japanese cruisers Myōkō and Takao in the Johore Strait. Smart was in command of XE1, targeting the Myōkō but after 16 hours ran out of time and laid the charges next to Takao, that had already been attacked by XE3. The attack on Takao lead to appointment as a Companion of the Distinguished Service Order (DSO), and as an Officer of the Legion of Merit from the United States.

== Later life ==
Smart retained his RNVR commission after the war and was promoted lieutenant commander on 1 March 1949. He was awarded the Volunteer Reserve Decoration (VRD) on 30 April 1953, and retired on 8 March 1954.

He then became a stockbroker with Pemberton Securities in their Vancouver office, remaining there until the 1980s, when he transferred to the Victoria, British Columbia office. He died in Victoria on 3 February 2008 at the age of 91. He is survived by his wife, Meghan, and two sons, Elliot and Christopher.
