= James Joseph Magennis =

British military diver

James Joseph Magennis VC
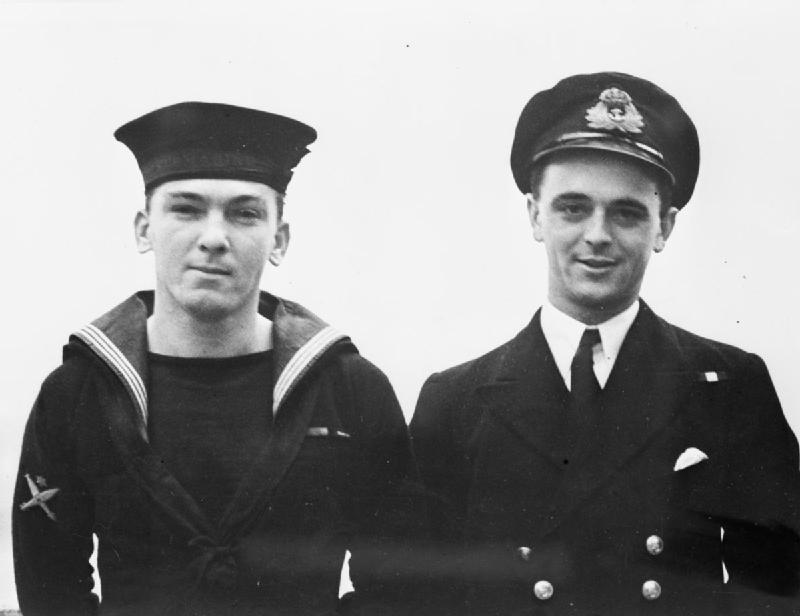
- Magennis (left) with Lieutenant Ian Fraser, 1945
- Born: James Joseph McGinnes; 27 October 1919; Belfast, Ireland
- Died: 12 February 1986 (aged 66); Halifax, West Yorkshire, England
- Military career
- Allegiance: United Kingdom
- Branch: Royal Navy
- Service years: 1935–1949
- Rank: Leading Seaman
- Units: HMS Kandahar; HMS XE3
- Conflicts: Second World War: Operation Source; Operation Struggle
- Awards: Victoria Cross; Mentioned in Despatches

James Joseph Magennis, VC (27 October 1919 – 12 February 1986) was a Belfast-born sailor and recipient of the Victoria Cross, the highest award for gallantry in the face of the enemy that can be awarded to British and Commonwealth forces. He was the only native of Northern Ireland to receive the Victoria Cross in the Second World War.

Magennis was part of several operations involving X-Craft midget submarines in attacks on Axis ships. In July 1945, Magennis was serving on HMS XE3 during Operation Struggle. During an attack on the Japanese cruiser Takao in Singapore, Magennis showed extraordinary valour and bravery by leaving the submarine for a second time in order to free some explosive charges that had got caught. His commanding officer, Lieutenant Ian Edward Fraser, was also awarded the Victoria Cross for his actions during the operation.

== Early career ==
James Magennis was born on 27 October 1919, at Majorca Street, West Belfast, Ireland. He was from a working class Roman Catholic family and attended St Finian's Primary School on the Falls Road, Belfast. On 3 June 1935 he enlisted in the Royal Navy as a boy seaman (spelling his surname Magennis).

Magennis served on several warships between 1935 and 1942, when he joined the submarine branch. Before joining the submarine branch, Magennis served on the destroyer Kandahar, which was mined off Tripoli, Libya, in December 1941, while Magennis was on board. The ship was irreparably damaged and was scuttled the following day.

In December 1942, Magennis was drafted into the Royal Navy Submarine Service and, in March 1943, he volunteered for "special and Hazardous duties" – which meant midget submarines, or X-craft. He trained as a diver, and in September 1943, took part in the first major use of the X-craft during Operation Source. Two submarines, HMS X7 and HMS X6, penetrated Kåfjord, Norway, and disabled the German battleship Tirpitz. For his part in the attack Magennis was Mentioned in Despatches "[f]or bravery and devotion to duty" in 1943.

== Operation Struggle ==
In July 1945, Magennis, as acting leading seaman, was serving as the diver on the midget submarine HMS XE3, under the command of Lieutenant Ian Edward Fraser, as part of Operation Struggle. They were tasked with sinking the 10,000 ton Takao, the first of the Takao-class cruiser. She was berthed in the Straits of Johor, Singapore, acting as an anti-aircraft battery. On 30 July, XE3 was towed to the area by the submarine Stygian. She slipped her tow at 23:00 for the 40-mile (64 km) journey through hazardous wrecks, minefields and listening posts to reach the Takao. After arriving at the Takao at 13:00 on 31 July, Magennis slipped out of the wet-and-dry chamber and attached limpet mines to the Takao under particularly difficult circumstances. He had to chip away at barnacles on the bottom of the cruiser for 30 minutes, before being able to attach the limpets.

During this time, Magennis' breathing apparatus was leaking and he returned to the submarine after completion of his task very exhausted. On withdrawing, Fraser found that one of the limpet carriers which was being jettisoned would not release itself. Magennis immediately volunteered to free it, commenting: "I'll be all right as soon as I've got my wind, Sir." This he did, after seven minutes of nerve-racking work with a heavy spanner. On completion, Magennis returned to XE3 for the second time, allowing the four-man midget submarine to make its escape out to open sea to meet the waiting Stygian. Fraser was also awarded the Victoria Cross for his part in the attack; whilst Lieutenant William J. L. Smith, who was at the controls of XE3 during the attack, received the Distinguished Service Order. Engineer third class Charles Alfred Reed, who was at the wheel, received the Conspicuous Gallantry Medal.

HMS XE1 was supposed to be attacking another Japanese vessel as part of the same operation, but actually ended up also placing its explosives under the same target. XE1's commanding officer, Lieutenant John Elliott Smart, and Sub-Lieutenant Harold Edwin Harper, received the Distinguished Service Cross. Engineer fourth class Henry James Fishleigh and leading seaman Walter Henry Arthur Pomeroy received the Distinguished Service Medal. Engineer fourth class Albert Nairn, leading stoker Jack Gordan Robinson, and Able Seaman Ernest Raymond Dee were mentioned in dispatches for their part in bringing the two midget submarines from harbour to the point where the crews that took part in the attack took over.

=== Victoria Cross ===
The citation was published in a supplement to the London Gazette of 9 November:

Leading Seaman Magennis served as Diver in His Majesty's Midget Submarine XE-3 for her attack on 31 July 1945, on a Japanese cruiser of the Atago class. The diver's hatch could not be fully opened because XE-3 was tightly jammed under the target, and Magennis had to squeeze himself through the narrow space available. He experienced great difficulty in placing his limpets on the bottom of the cruiser owing both to the foul state of the bottom and to the pronounced slope upon which the limpets would not hold. Before a limpet could be placed therefore Magennis had thoroughly to scrape the area clear of barnacles, and in order to secure the limpets he had to tie them in pairs by a line passing under the cruiser keel. This was very tiring work for a diver, and he was moreover handicapped by a steady leakage of oxygen which was ascending in bubbles to the surface. A lesser man would have been content to place a few limpets and then to return to the craft. Magennis, however, persisted until he had placed his full outfit before returning to the craft in an exhausted condition. Shortly after withdrawing Lieutenant Fraser endeavoured to jettison his limpet carriers, but one of these would not release itself and fall clear of the craft. Despite his exhaustion, his oxygen leak and the fact that there was every probability of his being sighted, Magennis at once volunteered to leave the craft and free the carrier rather than allow a less experienced diver to undertake the job. After seven minutes of nerve-racking work he succeeded in releasing the carrier. Magennis displayed very great courage and devotion to duty and complete disregard for his own safety.

== Later life ==
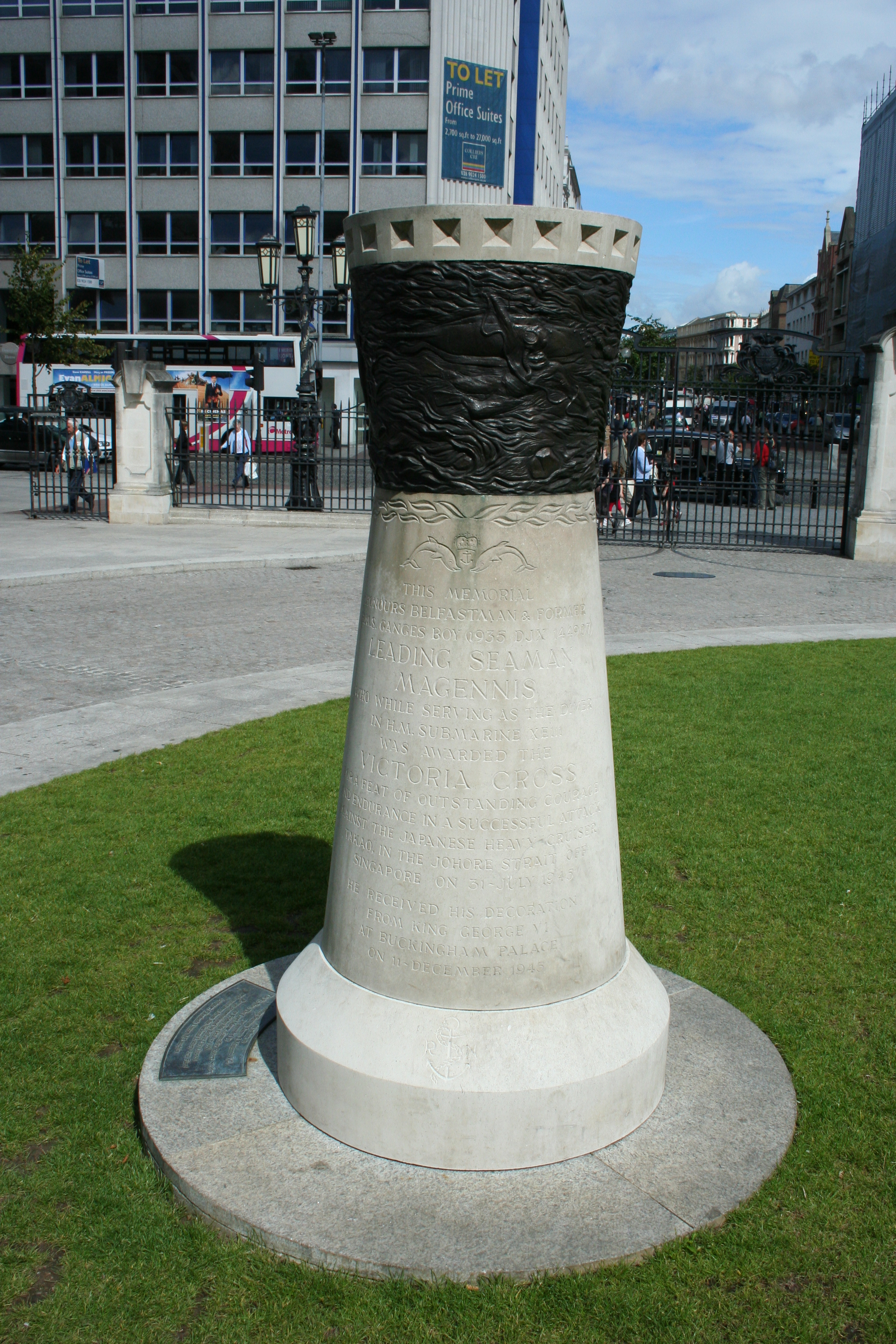
Memorial to Leading Seaman Magennis VC

Magennis was the only Victoria Cross recipient of the Second World War to hail from Northern Ireland. As a result, Magennis obtained something of a "celebrity status" in his home city. The citizens of Belfast raised more than £3,000 as part of a "Shilling Fund." The City Fathers of Belfast refused to give Magennis the freedom of the City though. Sources differ as to the reasoning behind this; some claim it was due to religious divisions, others claim it was due to the City Fathers not "... believing that such an honour could not be bestowed on a working-class Catholic from the inner-city slums."

In 1946 Magennis married Edna Skidmore, with whom he had four sons. The money from the Shilling Fund was spent quickly by Magennis and his wife; she remarked: "We are simple people ... forced into the limelight. We lived beyond our means because it seemed the right thing to do." In 1949 he left the navy and returned to Belfast, where, at some point, he sold his Victoria Cross. In 1955, he moved to Yorkshire, where he worked as an electrician. For the last years of his life, he suffered from chronic ill health, before dying on 11 February 1986 of lung cancer hours before his heroism was honoured by the Royal Navy Philatelic Office with a first-day cover.

== Memorials ==
Magennis has had several memorials in his honour. Initial official recognition was only a photograph in the robing room of the Belfast city council chamber. The first memorial was erected in 1999 after a long campaign by his biographer George Fleming and Major S.H. Pollock CD (Canada). It, an elegant bronze and stone statue created by sculptor Elizabeth McLaughlin, was unveiled in Belfast on 8 October 1999. The ceremony was conducted in the grounds of Belfast City Hall in the presence of Magennis's son Paul, by the Magennis's former commanding officer, Ian Fraser, was reported as saying: "Jim gave me bother from time to time. He liked his tot of rum, but he was a lovely man and a fine diver. I have never met a braver man. It was a privilege to know him and it's wonderful to see Belfast honour him at last." A wall mural commemorating James Magennis on the 60th anniversary of V-J Day was unveiled on 16 September 2005 by Peter Robinson, the Democratic Unionist Party Member of Parliament representing East Belfast, including Tullycarnet.

His portrait in oils was painted by Belfast artist Robert Taylor Carson who described Magennis as 'the perfect model - patient, attentive and completely natural.' The painting was purchased by Mr. Nevill McGeough Bond of the Argory, who then presented it to the Northern Ireland War Memorial Building Fund in 1946. The painting still hangs on display at the Northern Ireland War Memorial.

=== Magennis plaques ===
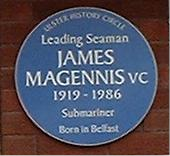
Royal Naval Association, Great Victoria Street, Belfast

In 1986 at a memorial service in Bradford Cathedral, the Submarine Old Comrade Association (West Riding Branch) erected a memorial plaque on an inner wall within the cathedral. The plaque made of Welsh slate was supplied by ex-submariner Tommy Topham MBE. Rear Admiral Place VC, CB, CVO, DSC unveiled the plaque. In attendance was Petty Officer Tommy "Nat" Gould, another submariner Victoria Cross recipient of the Second World War.

In 1998 a memorial plaque was installed by Castlereagh Borough Council on the wall of Magennis's former home at 32 Carncaver Road, Castlereagh, East Belfast. A memorial blue plaque sponsored by Belfast City Council was installed on the outer wall of the Royal Naval Association building at Great Victoria Street, Belfast by the Ulster History Circle.

=== Ashcroft collection ===
In 1986, there was some publicity in the newspapers that his VC would be up at auction. This attracted the interest of Michael Ashcroft, Baron Ashcroft, who bought the VC for £29,000 (plus fees) amidst strong competition from dealers and private collectors. This was the first Victoria Cross bought by Lord Ashcroft, who, as of 2006, owned 142 medals.

In July 2008, Lord Ashcroft announced a donation of £5 million for a permanent gallery at the Imperial War Museum, where Victoria Crosses already held by the museum will be put on display alongside his own. The Lord Ashcroft Gallery opened in 2010.

== In literature ==
Michael Longley wrote a poem entitled Ocean dedicated to James 'Mick' Magennis VC. He describes James' role on the attack on the submarine in Singapore as "swimming from the Falls Road Baths to Singapore".

== In media ==
Magennis was profiled in the 2006 television docudrama Victoria Cross Heroes, which included archive footage, dramatisations of his actions and an interview with Lord Ashcroft about his VC.
