= Inoguchi Toshihira =

Japanese vice-admiral

Toshihira Inoguchi
- 猪口 敏平
- Born: August 11, 1896; Tottori, Japan
- Died: October 24, 1944 (aged 48); Leyte Gulf, Philippines
- Military career
- Allegiance: Empire of Japan
- Branch: Imperial Japanese Navy
- Service years: 1918–1944
- Rank: Vice Admiral (posthumous)
- Commands: Irō, Natori, Takao, Musashi
- Conflicts: World War II; Pacific War; Battle of Leyte Gulf †

Toshihira Inoguchi (猪口 敏平, Inoguchi Toshihira; 11 August 1896 – 24 October 1944) was a Japanese vice-admiral and served as the commander of the Yamato-Class Battleship Musashi during World War II until his death.

== Biography ==
Inoguchi was born in Tottori prefecture. He graduated from the 46th class of the Imperial Japanese Naval Academy on 21 November 1918, ranking 10th of 124 cadets. He was posted to the armored cruiser Tokiwa until 1 August 1919, when he was reassigned to the light cruiser Tatsuta until 1 December 1919, when he was sent to the Naval Gunnery School for its Basic Gunnery Course. He completed the course on 31 May 1920 and was sent to the Torpedo School for its Basic Course, completing this on 1 December 1920, when he was posted to the destroyer Hakaze. He served aboard Hakaze until 7 May 1921, when he was posted to the armored cruiser Yakumo. While serving aboard Yakumo, he was promoted to lieutenant junior grade on 1 December 1921.

On 15 May 1922, Inoguchi was reassigned to the light cruiser Oi, serving aboard her until 10 November 1922. On 22 September 1923, he was assigned as an equipping officer of the gunboat Katata, and became the vessel's navigator on 20 October 1923, serving in that position until 1 December 1923, when he was selected to attend the Gunnery School's Advanced Course. He completed the course on 1 December 1924 and was promoted to lieutenant and assigned as a division officer aboard battleship Hyuga, serving in that position until 1 December 1925, when he returned to the Gunnery School to attend the Specialist Course, completing the course on 15 November 1926. He was promoted to lieutenant commander on 30 November 1929.

On 1 November 1930, Inoguchi was appointed gunnery officer of light cruiser Kinu, serving aboard her until 1 December 1931, when he was appointed the staff gunnery officer of Destroyer Squadron (DesRon) 2 until 1 December 1932. He was promoted to commander on 15 November 1934. On 15 November 1935, he was appointed gunnery officer of battleship Fuso, serving aboard her until 1 December 1936, when he was appointed staff gunnery officer of the Combined Fleet, with additional duty as staff gunnery officer of 1st Fleet. On 1 December 1937, he was appointed executive officer of the light cruiser Kuma, serving aboard her until 1 April 1938.

Promoted to captain on 15 November 1939, Inoguchi was given his first command, fleet oiler Iro, on 15 October 1940. He commanded Iro until 24 May 1941, when he was appointed chief instructor of the Naval Gunnery School (renamed Yokosuka Gunnery School on 1 June 1941), where he was serving when hostilities broke out between Japan and the United States. He remained in this post until 5 May 1942, when he was attached to Yokosuka Naval District. He was given command of light cruiser Natori on 1 July 1942.

Inoguchi commanded Natori during the landings on the Tanimbar Islands on 1 November 1942, and was still in command of the ship on 9 January 1943, when she was torpedoed by the submarine USS Tautog. Two torpedoes hit the ship in the stern, blowing it off and tearing away her rudder, but she was able to escape and return to base. Inoguchi was relieved of command on 20 January 1943 and once more attached to Yokosuka Naval District. The incident did not appear to affect his career, for he was attached to 2nd Fleet on 15 February 1943 and then given command of heavy cruiser Takao on 23 February 1943. During his tenure of command, Takao sortied twice to Brown Island, Eniwetok from 18–25 September and 17–23 October 1943 to intercept U.S. forces making raids in the Central Pacific, but did not see action. On 28 October 1943, Inoguchi handed over command of Takao to Captain Hayashi Shigechika and was once more attached to Yokosuka Naval District. On 1 December 1943, Inoguchi - by now considered the Imperial Japanese Navy's top gunnery expert - was appointed chief instructor of Yokosuka Gunnery School for a second tenure. He served at the school until 1 August 1944, when he was attached to Battleship Division (BatDiv) 1. On 12 August 1944, he relieved RADM Asakura Bunji as commanding officer of battleship Musashi.

Promoted to rear admiral on 15 October 1944, Inoguchi commanded Musashi during the Battle of Leyte Gulf. On 24 October 1944, during the Battle of the Sibuyan Sea, Musashi was overwhelmed by multiple air strikes and suffered severe damage from multiple bomb and torpedo hits. Inoguchi - wounded in his left shoulder - ordered the crew to "stand by to abandon ship", turned command over to his executive officer (Captain Kato Kenkichi) and retired to his sea cabin, choosing to go down with his ship. He was posthumously promoted to vice admiral.

On November 3, 1944, his son Satoshi was killed in action off Tacloban, Philippines, as a kamikaze pilot, being posthumously promoted to lieutenant.

Inoguchi's younger brother, Rikihei Inoguchi, followed him into the Imperial Japanese Navy. He graduated from the 52nd class of the Naval Academy, ranking 66th of 236 cadets, and was promoted to captain on 15 October 1944, the same day his elder brother was promoted to rear admiral. He served in aviation-related posts during the latter part of the war, including stints as CO of Air Group 153 (15 February – 10 July 1944), chief-of-staff of 23rd Air Flotilla (10 July – 10 August 1944), and CO of Suzuka Air Group (5 May – 3 August 1945). The younger Inoguchi survived the war and wrote a book on the history of the kamikaze forces. He died on 13 July 1983, aged 79.

== Promotions ==
Sleeve insignia of Vice-Admiral; the rank awarded to Toshihira Inoguchi posthumously

- Midshipman—November 21, 1918
- Ensign—August 1, 1919
- Sublieutenant—December 1, 1921
- Lieutenant—December 1, 1924
- Lieutenant Commander—November 30, 1929
- Commander—November 15, 1934
- Captain—November 15, 1939
- Rear admiral—October 15, 1944
- Vice admiral—October 24, 1944 (posthumous)
