= Ian Edward Fraser =

Royal Navy Victoria Cross recipient (1920–2008)

Ian Edward Fraser VC DSC RD JP
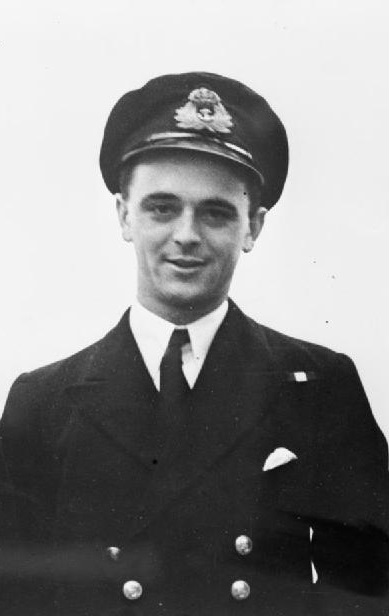
- Born: 18 December 1920; Ealing, Middlesex, England
- Died: 1 September 2008 (aged 87); Wirral, Merseyside, England
- Burial place: Landican, Merseyside, England
- Education: The Royal Grammar School, High Wycombe
- Military career
- Allegiance: United Kingdom
- Branch: Royal Navy
- Service years: 1939–1966
- Rank: Lieutenant commander
- Commands: XE-3
- Awards: Victoria Cross; Distinguished Service Cross; Decoration for Officers of the Royal Naval Reserve; Officer of the Legion of Merit (United States)
- Other work: Scuba Diving pioneer

Ian Edward Fraser, VC, DSC, RD, JP (18 December 1920 – 1 September 2008) was an English diving pioneer, sailor and recipient of the Victoria Cross, the highest award for gallantry in the face of the enemy that can be awarded to British and Commonwealth forces. Fraser was born in Ealing in Middlesex and went to school in High Wycombe. After initially working on merchant ships and serving in the Royal Naval Reserve, he joined the Royal Navy at the start of the Second World War. After being awarded the Distinguished Service Cross for actions while serving on submarines, he was placed in command of a midget submarine during an attack in Singapore codenamed Operation Struggle. For his bravery in navigating the mined waters, and successfully placing mines on a Japanese cruiser, Fraser was awarded the Victoria Cross.

After retiring from the Royal Navy, Fraser set up a commercial diving organisation after realising the ease of use of new frogman-type diving equipment. After serving in several honorary positions on the Wirral, Fraser retired from the Royal Naval Reserve as a lieutenant commander in 1965. He died on 1 September 2008, on the Wirral, Merseyside.

== Early life ==
Fraser was born in Ealing in 1920. He was the elder son of Sydney Fraser, a marine engineer. He attended the Royal Grammar School, High Wycombe, and the school ship HMS Conway. He worked on merchant ships from 1938 to 1939.

== Second World War ==
Fraser joined the Royal Naval Reserve in 1939, initially with the rank of midshipman, serving on several destroyers. In 1943, he joined the submarine HMS Sahib. He was awarded the Distinguished Service Cross in 1943 for "bravery and skill in successful submarine patrols." In 1944, at age 24, he became a lieutenant in the Royal Naval Reserve, and volunteered to serve on the 'X' craft midget submarine depot ship HMS Bonaventure from 7 November 1944 to July 1945.

Ian Fraser was played by actor Martin Delaney in a TV show entitled, Victoria Cross Heroes. The show was narrated in part by Charles, Prince of Wales. It tells the story of Fraser's attempt to sink the Takao on a secret mission aboard a midget submarine.

On 31 July 1945 in the Straits of Johor between Singapore and Malaya, Lieutenant Fraser, in command of an improved X-boat, HMS XE-3, attacked the Japanese heavy cruiser Takao, after making a long and hazardous journey through mined waters. Fraser slid the submarine under the Takao, which lay over a depression in the sea bed, and his diver Acting Leading Seaman James Joseph Magennis went out to fix the limpet mines to the bottom of the ship. The two side-charges then had to be released from XE-3, but the starboard charge stuck and Magennis climbed out again and after a nerve-wracking seven minutes released the charge. XE-3 then made for home. Magennis was also awarded a Victoria Cross, and Fraser became a lieutenant commander.

The citation was published in a supplement to the London Gazette of 9 November 1945 (dated 13 November 1945) and read:

ADMIRALTY

Whitehall, 13th November, 1945.

The KING has been graciously pleased to approve the award of the VICTORIA CROSS for valour to: —

[...]

Lieutenant Ian Edward FRASER, D.S.C., R.N.R.

Lieutenant Fraser commanded His Majesty's Midget Submarine XE-3 in a successful attack on a Japanese heavy cruiser of the Atago class at her moorings in Johore Strait, Singapore, on 31st July, 1945. During the long approach up the Singapore Straits XE-3 deliberately left the believed safe channel and entered mined waters to avoid suspected hydrophone posts. The target was aground, or nearly aground, both fore and aft, and only under the midship portion was there just sufficient water for XE-3 to place herself under the cruiser. For forty minutes XE-3 pushed her way along the seabed until finally Lieutenant Fraser managed to force her right under the centre of the cruiser.

Here he placed the limpets and dropped his main side charge. Great difficulty was experienced in extricating the craft after the attack had been completed, but finally XE-3 was clear, and commenced her long return journey out to sea. The courage and determination of Lieutenant Fraser are beyond all praise. Any man not possessed of his relentless determination to achieve his object in full, regardless of all consequences, would have dropped his side charge alongside the target instead of persisting until he had forced his submarine right under the cruiser. The approach and withdrawal entailed a passage of 80 miles through water which had been mined by both the enemy and ourselves, past hydrophone positions, over loops and controlled minefields, and through an anti-submarine boom.

His VC is on display in the Lord Ashcroft Gallery at the Imperial War Museum, London.

== Later life ==
- 1946: Fraser was awarded the American decoration of Legion of Merit, Degree of Officer.
- 1947: Fraser left the Royal Navy, but he remained in the Royal Naval Reserve. He set up a commercial diving firm.
- 1953: He was promoted to lieutenant commander.
- 1957: Fraser's autobiography Frogman VC was published.
- 1957: He became a Justice of the Peace in Wallasey.
- 16 August 1963: He was awarded a clasp to his Decoration for Officers of the Royal Naval Reserve.
- 18 December 1965: He left the Royal Naval Reserve.
- 1980: He became a Younger Brother of Trinity House.
- 1993: He was made an honorary freeman of the Metropolitan Borough of Wirral.
- 1 September 2008: Fraser died aged 87 at Arrowe Park Hospital, after a three-week illness. He was survived by his wife Melba, and 5 of his 6 children, and 13 grandchildren, and 7 great-grandchildren. He was cremated at Landican cemetery, Birkenhead.

=== Scuba diving ===
Realising that frogman-type diving (i.e. what is now called scuba diving) could do many sorts of underwater work unsuitable for the old-type heavy standard diving gear, he and some associates got hold of war-surplus frogman's kit and set up a popular public show displaying frogman techniques in a big aquarium tank in Belle Vue Zoo in Manchester in England. One of his early calls to underwater work was from the police to recover the body of a little girl who had drowned in a pond in Denton, Greater Manchester.

Using the show's takings, and with his younger brother Brian Fraser, he set up a commercial diving organisation called Universal Divers Ltd, of which he was managing director from 1947 to 1965 and, since 1983 (as former chairman).

In January 1961 Universal Divers Ltd was involved in underwater survey on damage caused to the Severn Railway Bridge by collision by two barges.

== See also ==
- British commando frogmen
