= HMS Stygian =

Submarine of the Royal Navy

Coordinates: 5°42′N 98°57′E

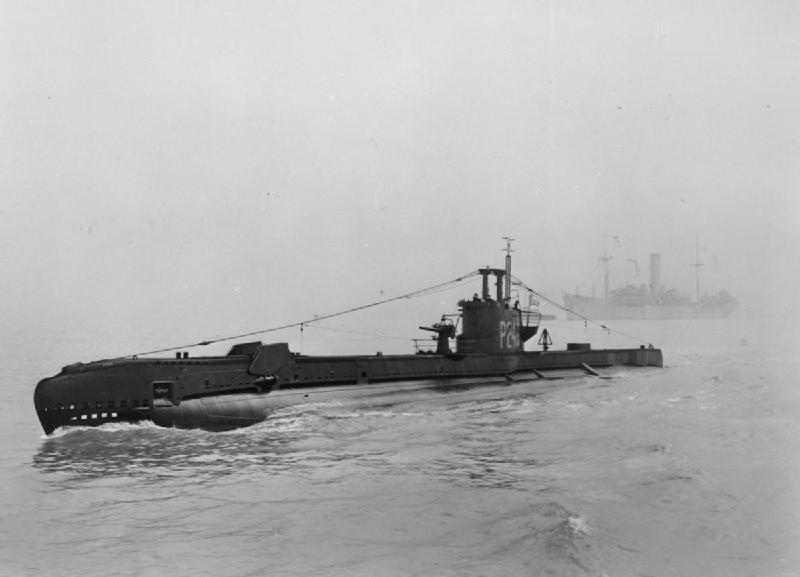

History

United Kingdom
- Name: HMS Stygian
- Builder: Cammell Laird Shipyard, Birkenhead
- Laid down: 6 January 1943
- Launched: 30 November 1943
- Commissioned: 29 February 1944
- Decommissioned: 29 October 1949
- Fate: Sold for scrapping 28 October 1949
- Badge

General characteristics
- Class & type: S-class submarine
- Displacement: 814-872 tons surfaced; 990 tons submerged
- Length: 217 ft (66 m)
- Beam: 23 ft 6 in (7.16 m)
- Draught: 11 ft (3.4 m)
- Speed: 14.75 kn (27.32 km/h; 16.97 mph) surfaced; 8 kn (15 km/h; 9.2 mph) submerged
- Complement: 48 officers and men
- Armament: 6 × forward 21 inch (533 mm) torpedo tubes, one aft; 13 torpedoes; 1 × 3 in (76 mm) gun; 1 × 20 mm cannon; 3 × .303-calibre machine guns

HMS Stygian (pennant number P249) was a S-class submarine of the British Royal Navy, and the only ship so far to bear the name. The boat is listed as being a member of the fourth group, although she had the external stern torpedo tube fitted as in the third group.

After an eventful career in the Pacific during the Second World War, she was sold to be broken up for scrap on 28 October 1949, and finally scrapped by Metal Industries of Ardgour in August 1950.

== Career ==
On being commissioned, HMS Stygian was under the command of Lt. G.S.C. Clarabut, RN. She was assigned to operate with the Eastern Fleet in the Pacific Ocean. She had a short, but eventful wartime career, sinking eight Japanese sailing vessels, five Japanese coasters, six unidentified Japanese vessels and the ship Nichinan Maru. She also sank the Japanese auxiliary minesweeper Wa 104 (the former Dutch Djember) and damaged the Japanese auxiliary submarine chaser Cha 104 off Bali. Stygian acted as tow for the midget submarine XE-3, when XE-3 attacked the Japanese cruiser Takao in Singapore Harbour in Operation Struggle.
