= Operation Sabre =

Royal Navy military operation in World War II

- Part of South-East Asian theatre of World War II
Date	31 July – 3 August 1945
Location	Mekong Delta
Result	Allied victory

Belligerents
United Kingdom; Australia	Empire of Japan

Commanders and leaders
Lt. Maxwell H. Shean	Unknown

Operation Sabre was a Royal Navy military operation in World War II. It involved cutting the Japanese submarine communications cable linking Saigon and Singapore. operating from an X-Craft midget submarine in the Saigon River delta on 31 July 1945.

Operation Sabre was directed at the Hong Kong to Saigon telephone cable, and carried out by XE4, which was towed to within 40 miles (64 km) of the Mekong Delta by the submarine HMS Spearhead. Steered by Vernon Ginger Coles XE4 looked for the two telephone cables by using a towed grapnel. She eventually snagged the first cable, and managed to haul it about 10 feet (3.0 m) off the seabed. XE4's diver, Sub-Lieutenant K.M. Briggs, used the net/cable cutter to sever it. The second cable was soon found as well, and was severed by the second diver, Sub-Lieutenant A. Bergius. Two divers were carried due to the operating rule that a diver should not spend more than 20 minutes in depths over 33 feet (10 m) and no more than 10 minutes over 40 feet (12 m). XE4 and Spearhead returned to Labuan on 3 August 1945.

Lieutenant Maxwell H. Shean, DSO and bar, Royal Australian Naval Volunteer Reserve, was awarded the American Bronze Star Medal in March 1947 for meritorious achievement as the commanding officer of the midget submarine HMS XE4.
