= HMS Spark =

Submarine of the Royal Navy

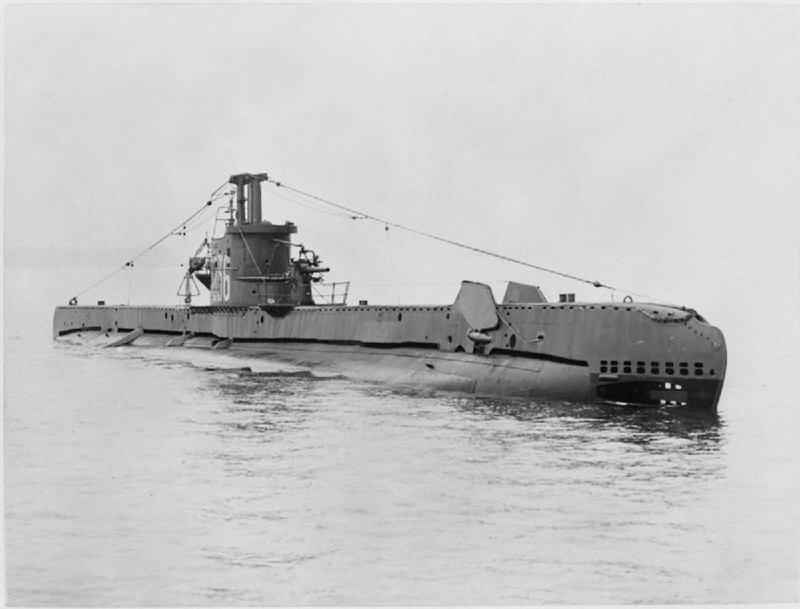

History

United Kingdom
- Name: HMS Spark
- Builder: Scotts, Greenock
- Laid down: 10 October 1942
- Launched: 28 December 1943
- Commissioned: 28 April 1944
- Fate: broken up October 1950
- Badge

General characteristics
- Class & type: S-class submarine
- Displacement: 842 long tons (856 t) surfaced; 990 long tons (1,010 t) submerged
- Length: 217 ft (66.1 m)
- Beam: 23 ft 9 in (7.2 m)
- Draught: 14 ft 8 in (4.5 m)
- Installed power: 1,900 bhp (1,400 kW) (diesel); 1,300 hp (970 kW) (electric)
- Propulsion: 2 × diesel engines; 2 × electric motors
- Speed: 15 knots (28 km/h; 17 mph) surfaced; 10 knots (19 km/h; 12 mph) submerged
- Range: 6,000 nmi (11,000 km; 6,900 mi) at 10 knots (19 km/h; 12 mph) surface; 120 nmi (220 km; 140 mi) at 3 knots (5.6 km/h; 3.5 mph) submerged
- Test depth: 300 feet (91.4 m)
- Complement: 48
- Armament: 7 × 21 in (533 mm) torpedo tubes (6 bow, 1 stern); 1 × 3-inch (76 mm) deck gun

HMS Spark (pennant number P236) was a S-class submarine of the third batch built for the Royal Navy during World War II. She survived the war and was scrapped in 1950.

== Design and description ==
The third batch was slightly enlarged and improved over the preceding second batch of the S-class. The submarines had a length of 217 feet (66.1 m) overall, a beam of 23 feet 9 inches (7.2 m) and a draught of 14 feet 8 inches (4.5 m). They displaced 842 long tons (856 t) on the surface and 990 long tons (1,010 t) submerged. The S-class submarines had a crew of 48 officers and ratings. They had a diving depth of 300 feet (91.4 m).

For surface running, the boats were powered by two 950-brake-horsepower (708 kW) diesel engines, each driving one propeller shaft. When submerged each propeller was driven by a 650-horsepower (485 kW) electric motor. They could reach 15 knots (28 km/h; 17 mph) on the surface and 10 knots (19 km/h; 12 mph) underwater. On the surface, the third batch boats had a range of 6,000 nautical miles (11,000 km; 6,900 mi) at 10 knots (19 km/h; 12 mph) and 120 nmi (220 km; 140 mi) at 3 knots (5.6 km/h; 3.5 mph) submerged.

The boats were armed with seven 21 inch (533 mm) torpedo tubes. A half-dozen of these were in the bow and there was one external tube in the stern. They carried six reload torpedoes for the bow tubes for a grand total of thirteen torpedoes. Twelve mines could be carried in lieu of the internally stowed torpedoes. They were also armed with a 3-inch (76 mm) deck gun.

== Construction and career ==
HMS Spark was built by Scotts, of Greenock and launched on 28 December 1943. Thus far she has been the only ship of the Royal Navy to bear the name Spark. She survived the Second World War, spending between December 1944 and July 1945 with the Eastern Fleet, arriving at Trincomalee on 21 October 1944. She went on to sink two Japanese sailing vessels, three Japanese coasters, a barge and a tug. Another coaster was forced ashore on Panjang Island. Spark was attacked by an enemy escort which dropped sixteen depth charges, but managed to escape damage. She returned to the UK in October 1945. She was sold on 28 October 1949. Spark was broken up at Faslane in October 1950.

Spark acted as tow for the midget submarine XE-1, which was assigned to attack the Japanese heavy cruiser Myōkō in Singapore Harbour as part of Operation Struggle.
