= HMS Varbel =

WWII British naval base

Coordinates: 55.859731°N 5.076229°W

History

United Kingdom
- Name: HMS Varbel
- Recommissioned: 1942?
- Decommissioned: 1945
- Fate: Decommissioned and closed down

General characteristics
- Class & type: Stone frigate

HMS Varbel was a Royal Navy shore establishment during World War II, used as a base for Operation Source. It was in the luxury 88-bedroomed Kyles Hydro Hotel at Port Bannatyne on the Isle of Bute in the Firth of Clyde off the west coast of Scotland.

The hotel was demolished in the 1970s. The houses along the waterfront are still there. The pier has gone except some old decaying piles.
