= HMS Selene =

Submarine of the Royal Navy

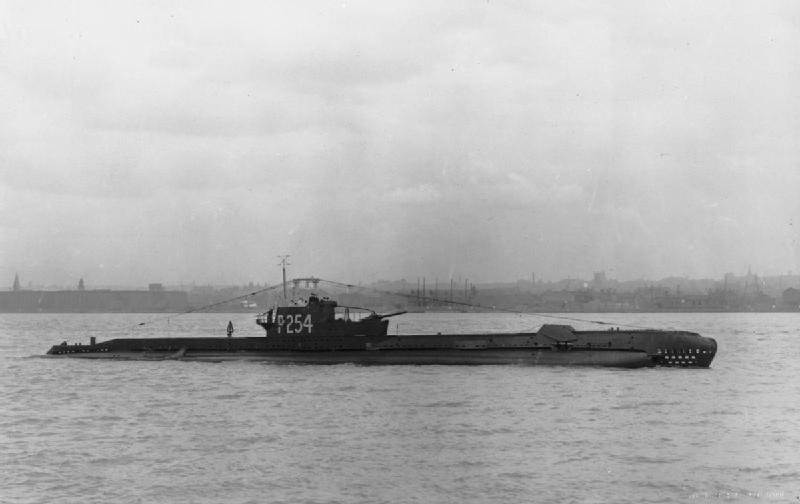
- HMS Selene

History

United Kingdom
- Name: HMS Selene
- Builder: Cammell Laird & Co Limited, Birkenhead
- Laid down: 16 April 1943
- Launched: 24 April 1944
- Commissioned: 14 July 1944
- Fate: Sold for breaking up 1961
- Badge

General characteristics
- Class & type: S-class submarine
- Displacement: 814 long tons (827 t) surfaced; 990 long tons (1,010 t) submerged
- Length: 217 ft (66.1 m)
- Beam: 23 ft 9 in (7.2 m)
- Draught: 14 ft 1 in (4.3 m)
- Installed power: 1,900 bhp (1,400 kW) (diesel); 1,300 hp (970 kW) (electric)
- Propulsion: 2 × diesel engines; 2 × electric motors
- Speed: 14.75 knots (27.32 km/h; 16.97 mph) surfaced; 9 knots (17 km/h; 10 mph) submerged
- Range: 7,500 nmi (13,900 km; 8,600 mi) at 10 knots (19 km/h; 12 mph) surface; 120 nmi (220 km; 140 mi) at 3 knots (5.6 km/h; 3.5 mph) submerged
- Test depth: 350 feet (106.7 m)
- Complement: 48
- Armament: 6 × bow 21 in (533 mm) torpedo tubes; 1 × 4-inch (102 mm) deck gun

HMS Selene was a S-class submarine of the third batch built for the Royal Navy during World War II. She survived the war and was sold for scrap in 1961.

== Design and description ==
The last 17 boats of the third batch were significantly modified from the earlier boats. They had a stronger hull, carried more fuel and their armament was revised. The submarines had a length of 217 feet (66.1 m) overall, a beam of 23 feet 9 inches (7.2 m) and a draught of 14 feet 1 inch (4.3 m). They displaced 814 long tons (827 t) on the surface and 990 long tons (1,010 t) submerged. The S-class submarines had a crew of 48 officers and ratings. They had a diving depth of 350 feet (106.7 m).

For surface running, the boats were powered by two 950-brake-horsepower (708 kW) diesel engines, each driving one propeller shaft. When submerged each propeller was driven by a 650-horsepower (485 kW) electric motor. They could reach 14.75 knots (27.32 km/h; 16.97 mph) on the surface and 9 knots (17 km/h; 10 mph) underwater. On the surface, the third batch boats had a range of 7,500 nautical miles (13,900 km; 8,600 mi) at 10 knots (19 km/h; 12 mph) and 120 nmi (220 km; 140 mi) at 3 knots (5.6 km/h; 3.5 mph) submerged.

Selene was armed with six 21-inch (533 mm) torpedo tubes in the bow. She carried six reload torpedoes for a total of a dozen torpedoes. Twelve mines could be carried in lieu of the torpedoes. The boat was also equipped with a 4-inch (102 mm) deck gun.

== Construction and career ==
HMS Selene built by Cammell Laird & Co Limited, Birkenhead and launched on 24 April 1944. So far it has been the only ship of the Royal Navy to bear the name Selene. The boat spent most of the Second World War serving in the Far East, where it was used to sink five Japanese sailing vessels and three coasters, and damage another sailing vessel and coaster. It survived the war and in the early 1950s was modified to become a fast unarmed underwater target to train anti-submarine personnel. Its torpedo tubes were covered to streamline its hull, and the three external tubes (two bow, one stern) were removed, as was the gun. Its bridge superstructure was reduced to little more than a blister with a small cockpit in it, and it had only a single periscope. It operated with the Second Submarine Squadron at Portland throughout the 1950s. It was sold, arriving at Gateshead on 6 June 1961 for breaking up.
