= Japanese cruiser Takao (1930) =

One of the Takao class heavy cruisers built for the Imperial Japanese Navy

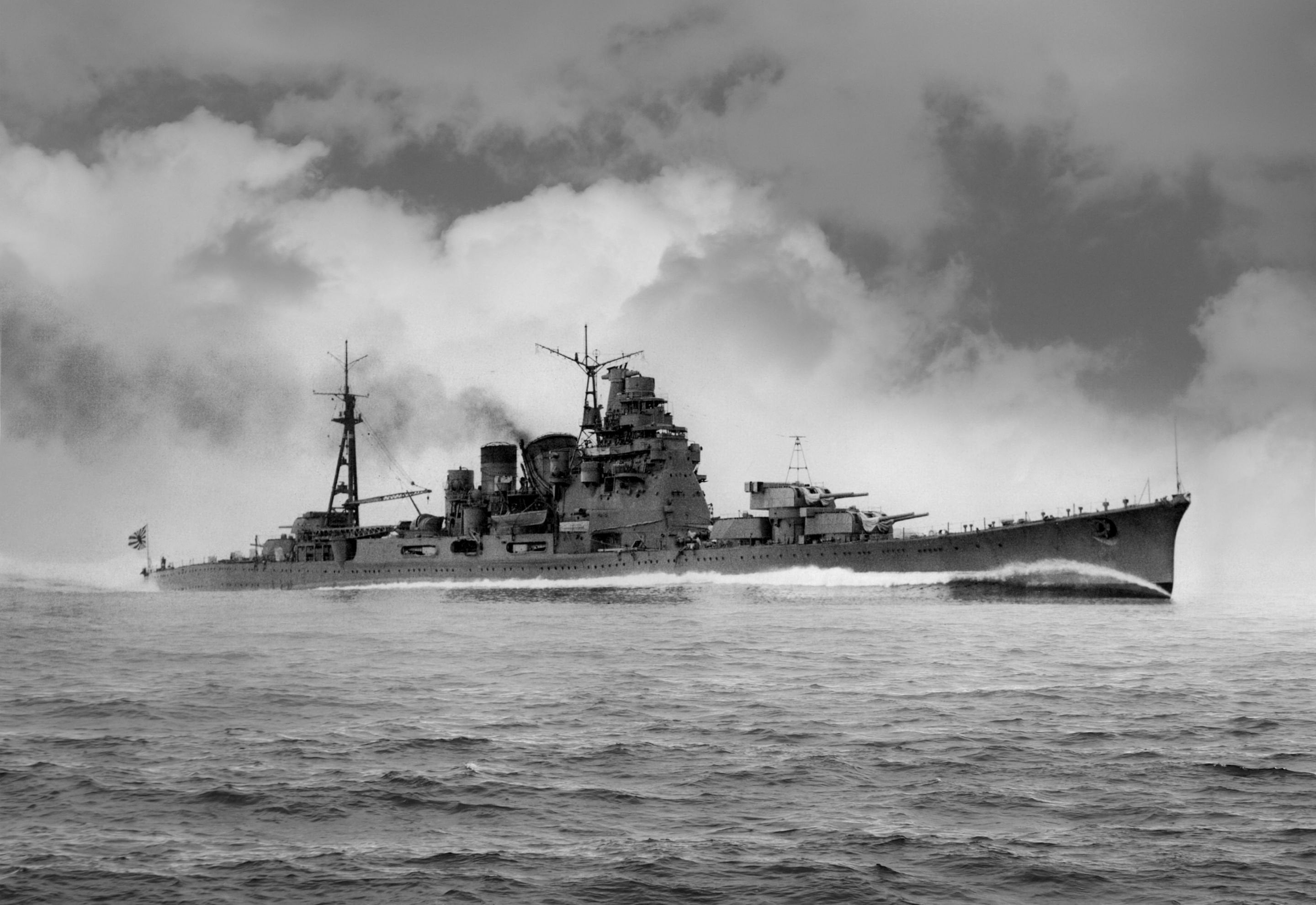
- Takao on sea trials, 14 July 1939

History

Empire of Japan
- Name: Takao
- Namesake: Mount Takao
- Ordered: early 1927
- Builder: Yokosuka Naval Arsenal
- Laid down: 28 April 1927
- Launched: 12 May 1930
- Commissioned: 31 May 1932
- Stricken: 3 May 1947
- Fate: Surrendered to British forces on 21 September 1945, then sunk as a target ship on 29 October 1946

General characteristics
- Class & type: Takao-class cruiser
- Displacement: 9,850 t (9,690 long tons) (designed standard), 15,490 t (15,250 long tons) (full load)
- Length: Length between perpendiculars: 192.5 m (632 ft); Overall: 203.76 m (668.5 ft)
- Beam: 19–20.4 m (62–67 ft)
- Draught: 6.11–6.32 m (20.0–20.7 ft)
- Propulsion: 4-shaft geared turbine, 12 Kampon boilers, 132,000 shp (98,000 kW)
- Speed: 35.5–34.2 knots (65.7–63.3 km/h)
- Range: 8,500 nautical miles (15,740 km) at 14 knots (26 km/h)
- Complement: 773
- Armament: Original layout: 10 × 20 cm/50 3rd Year Type No.2 naval guns (5x2); 4 × Type 10 12 cm high angle guns (4x1); 8 × 61 cm torpedo tubes (4×2, 24 Type 90 torpedoes); 2 × 40 mm (1.6 in) AA guns (2x1); 2 x 7.7 mm Type 92 MG (2x1); Final Layout: 10 × 20 cm/50 3rd Year Type No.2 naval guns (5x2); 8 × Type 89 12.7 cm (5 in) dual purpose guns (4x2); 60 × Type 96 25 mm (1.0 in) AA guns (30x1, 6x2, 6x3); 16 torpedo tubes (4×4, plus 8 reloads; 24 Type 93 torpedoes); Depth charges
- Armour: main belt: 38 to 127 mm; main deck: 37 mm (max); upper deck: 12.7 to 25 mm; bulkheads: 76 to 100 mm; turrets: 25 mm
- Aircraft carried: 3 floatplanes (1 Aichi E13A1 "Jake" & 2 F1M2 "Pete")
- Aviation facilities: 2 aircraft catapults

Takao (高雄) was the lead vessel in the Takao-class heavy cruisers, active in World War II with the Imperial Japanese Navy. These were the largest cruisers in the Japanese fleet, and were intended to form the backbone of a multipurpose long-range strike force. Her sister ships were Atago, Maya and Chōkai. Takao was the only ship of her class to survive the war. She was surrendered to British forces at Singapore in September 1945, then sunk as a target ship in 1946.

== Background ==
The Takao-class ships were approved under the 1927 to 1931 supplementary fiscal year budget, and like her sister ships, was named after a mountain. Mount Takao (高雄山) is located outside Kyoto and is not to be confused with the similarly named Mount Takao (高尾山) located outside Tokyo, or the city of Takao (高雄, Kaohsiung), in Taiwan.

== Design ==
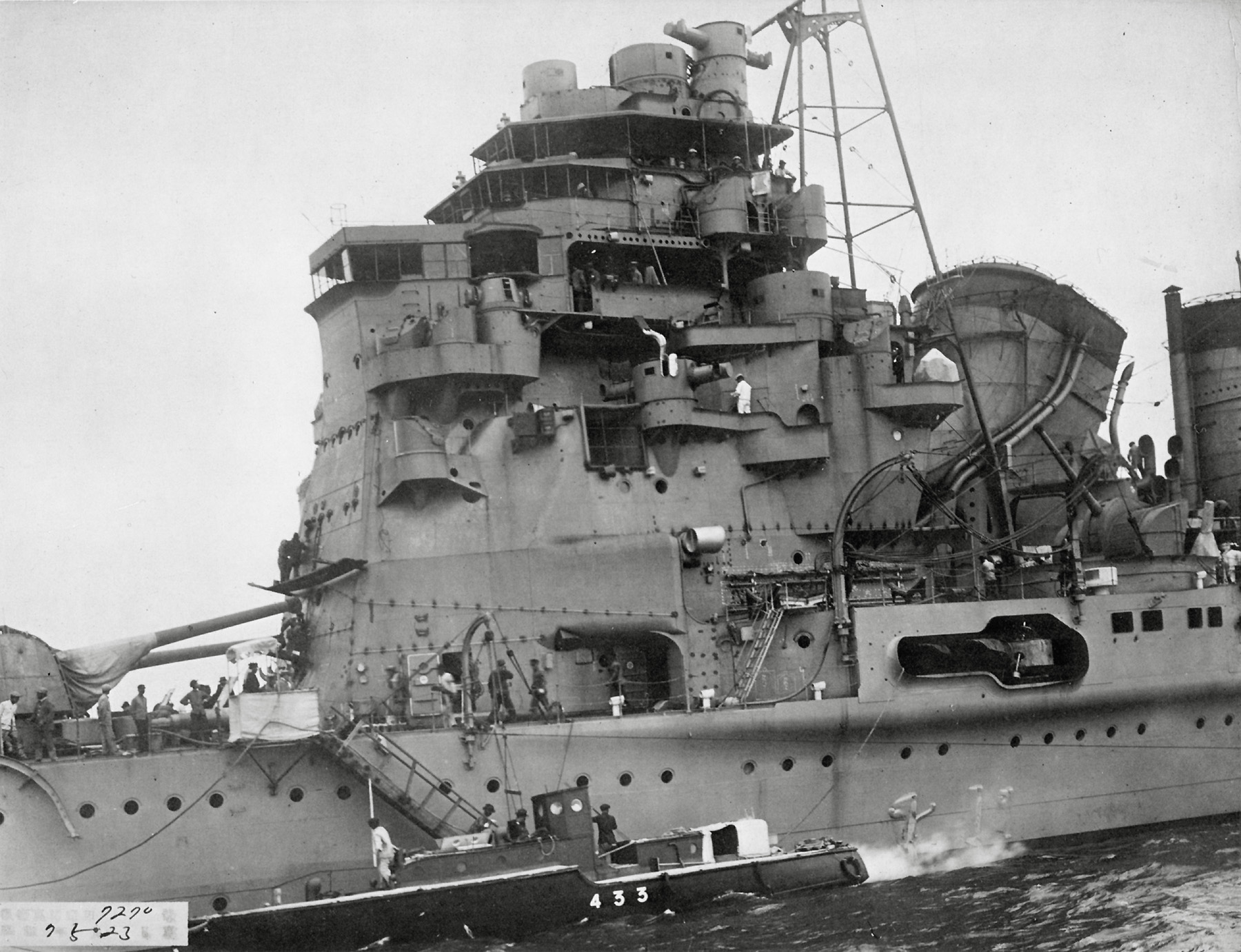
The bridge of Takao the year she was commissioned, 1932

The Takao-class cruisers were an improved version of the previous Myōkō-class design, incorporating technical elements learned with the development of the experimental light cruiser Yūbari. They had a distinctive profile with a large, raked main funnel, and a smaller, straight, second funnel. Intended to address issues with the Myōkō class, the Takao class had thicker armor, dual-purpose main guns which could be used against aircraft, and torpedo launchers moved to the upper deck for greater safety. However, as with its predecessors, the Takao class was also top-heavy.

The Takao class displaced 16,875 t (16,608 long tons). Takao was 203.8 metres (669 ft) long, with a beam of 20.4 metres (67 ft), draft of 6.32 metres (20.7 ft) and were capable of 35.25 knots.

Propulsion was by 12 Kampon boilers driving four sets of single-impulse geared turbine engines, with four shafts turning three-bladed propellers. The ship was armored with a 127 mm (5 in) side belt, and 35 mm (1 in) armored deck; the bridge was armored with 10 to 16 mm (0.39 to 0.63 in) armored plates.

Takao’s main battery was ten 20 cm/50 3rd Year Type naval guns, the heaviest armament of any heavy cruiser in the world at the time, mounted in five twin turrets. Her secondary armament included four Type 10 12cm dual purpose guns in two single mounts on each side, and 16 Type 90 torpedoes in four quadruple launchers. She was very deficient in anti-aircraft capability, with only two 40 mm (1.57 in) anti-aircraft guns. Takao's (except Chōkai) was repeatedly modernized and upgraded throughout her career in order to counter the growing threat of air strikes, and in her final configuration was armed with ten 20 cm/50 3rd Year Type naval guns (5x2), eight Type 89 12.7 cm (5 in) dual purpose guns, (4x2), and 16 Type 93 Long Lance torpedoes in four quadruple launchers (plus 8 reloads). Anti-aircraft protection included 24 triple-mount and 12 twin-mount and 26 single-mount Type 96 25 mm AT/AA Guns and four 13.2 mm (0.52 in) AA machine guns.

== Operational history ==
=== Early operations ===
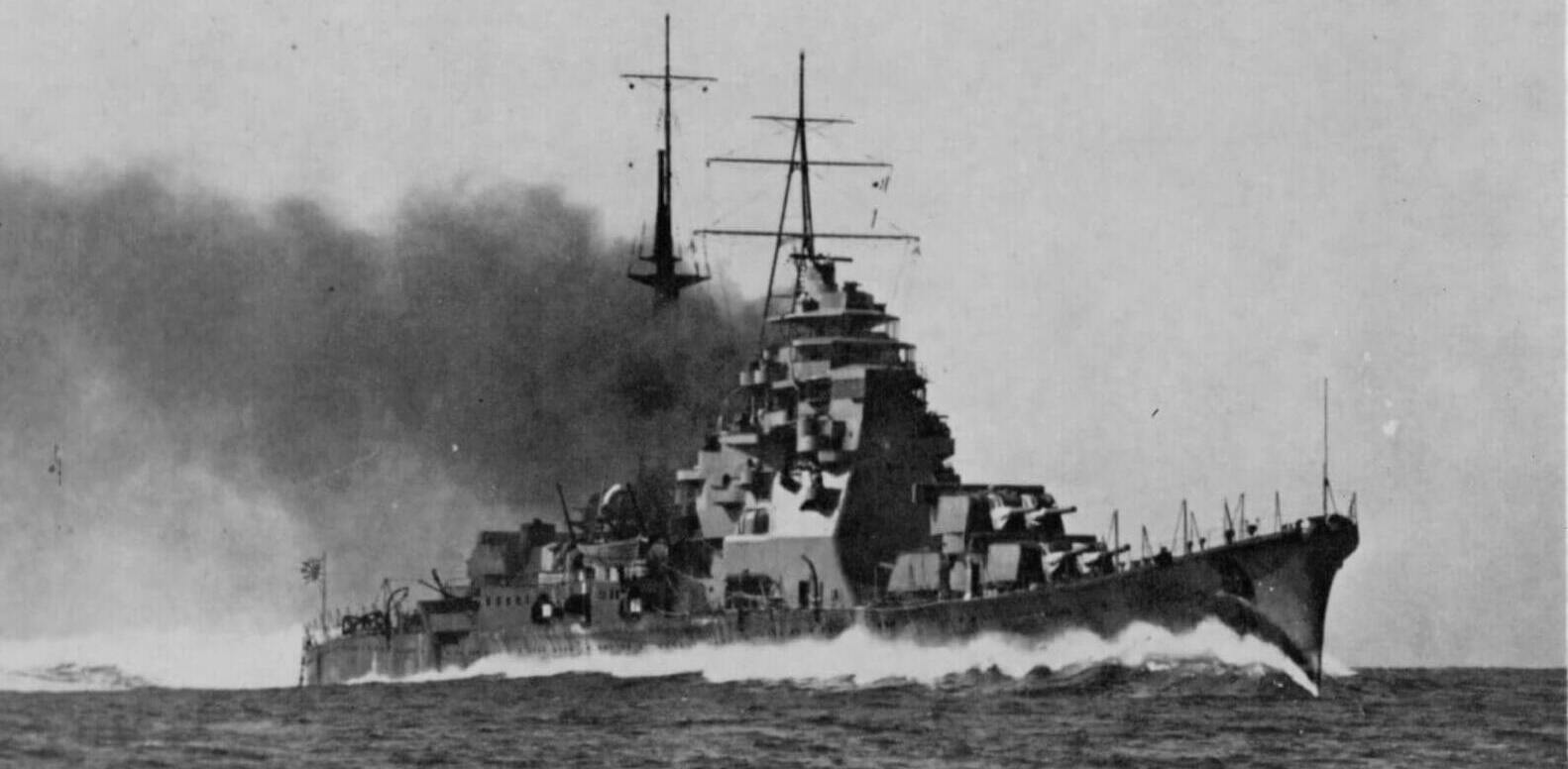

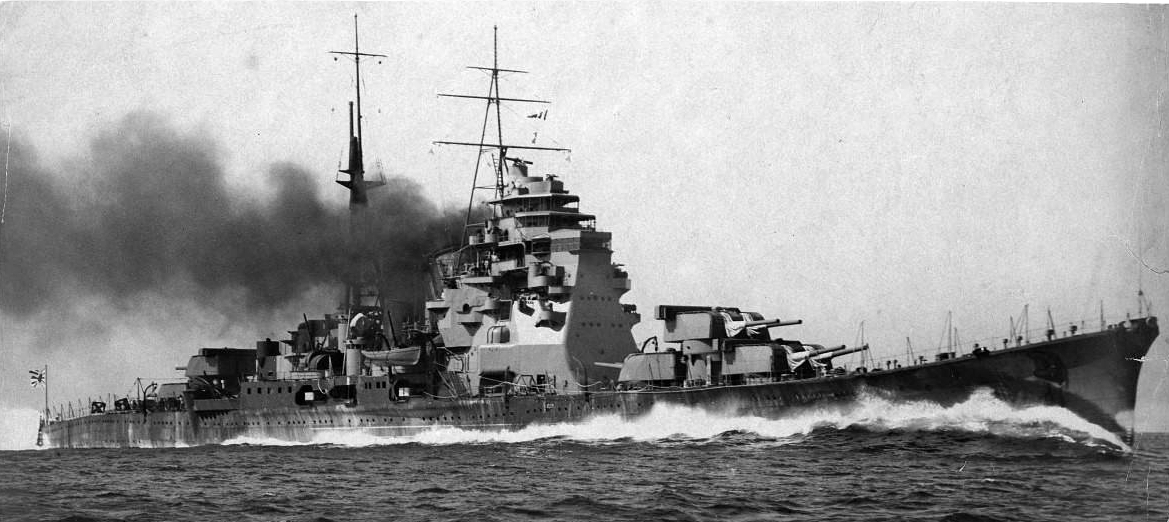
Takao on a trial run at full speed off Tateyama, mouth of Tokyo Bay, 1 July 1932

Takao was laid down at the Yokosuka Naval Arsenal on 28 April 1927, launched and named on 12 May 1930, and was commissioned into the Imperial Japanese Navy on 31 May 1932. Although the first ship in her class to be laid down, Atago was actually completed two months earlier.

All of the Takao class were assigned to the Yokosuka Naval District, forming Sentai-4 of the IJN 2nd Fleet, and trained as a unit during the 1930s. She was captained by Captain Chūichi Nagumo from November 1933 to 1934, Captain Eiji Gotō from November 1934 to 1935, Captain Takeo Takagi from December 1936 to 1937 and Captain Tadashige Daigo from December 1937 to 1938. During this time, issues with their stability and seaworthiness due to the top-heavy design became evident. Takao and Atago were rebuilt at the Yokosuka Naval Arsenal between 1938 and 1939, resulting in an improved design: the size of the bridge was reduced, the main mast was relocated aft, and hull bulges were added to improve stability. Maya and Chōkai were not modified as extensively, and can be considered mistakenly as a separate class. After rebuilding was completed, Takao and Atago patrolled off the coast of China in 1940 and early 1941.

=== Pacific War ===
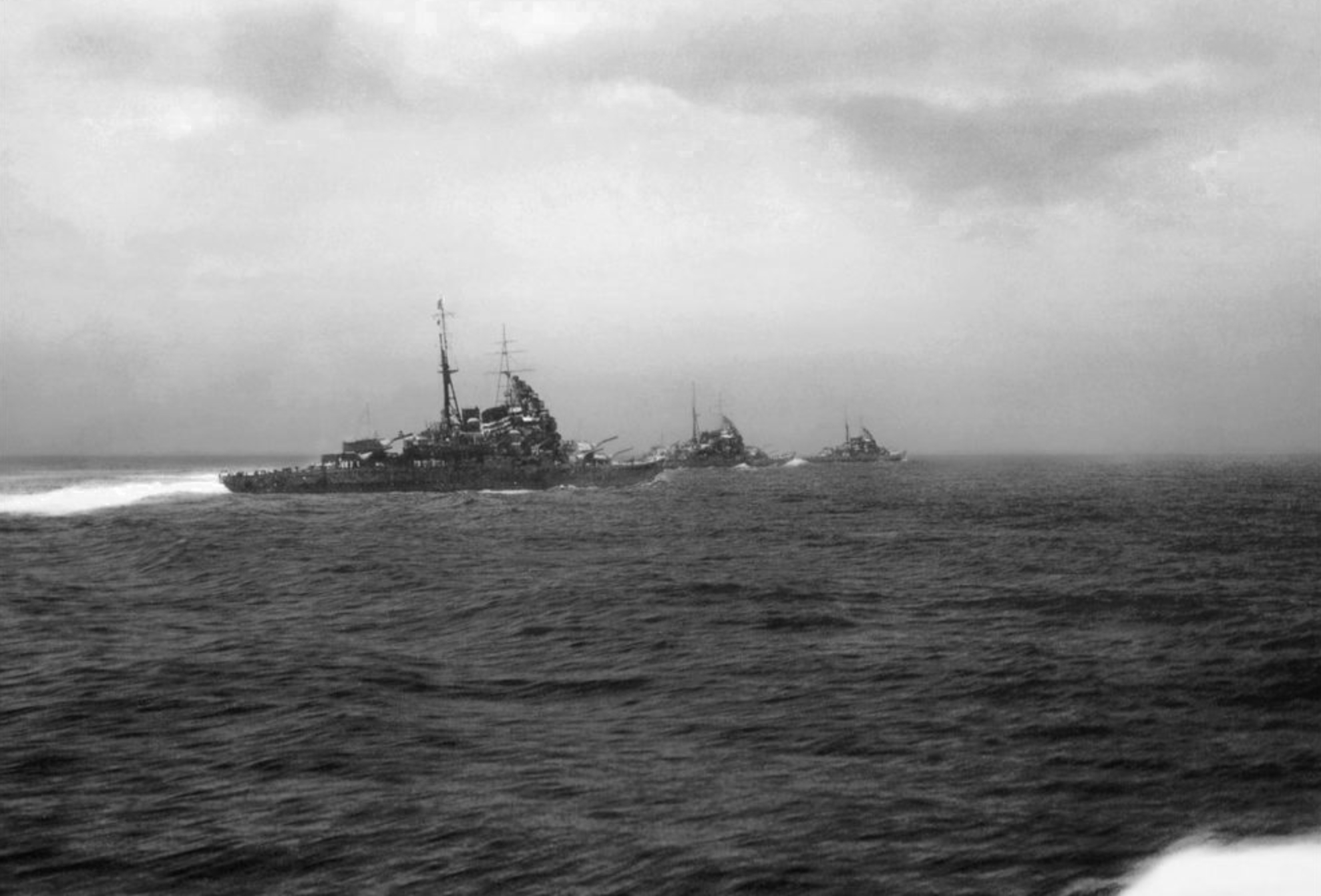
Takao-class cruisers of Sentai-4 underway, during a training exercise in August 1933. From left to right: Takao, Atago and Chōkai.

At the time of the attack on Pearl Harbor, Takao was commanded by Captain Asakura Bunji and assigned to Vice Admiral Nobutake Kondō's Sentai-4 together with her three sister ships and provided gunfire support for the landings at Lingayen Gulf on Luzon in the Philippines. In February 1942, operating out of Palau, Takao was assigned to intercept shipping escaping from the Netherlands East Indies. One of Takao's floatplanes bombed the Dutch freighter Enggano on 1 March 1942. The next night, Takao and Atago overtook the old United States Navy destroyer Pillsbury and sank her with no survivors. Early on 4 March, Takao, Atago, Maya and the destroyers Arashi and Nowaki, attacked a convoy near Tjilatjap. The Royal Australian Navy sloop HMAS Yarra defended the convoy for an hour and half, but was sunk. The Japanese cruisers then sank three ships from the convoy: the tanker Francol, the depot ship Anking, and Royal Navy Minesweeper-51. Two Dutch freighters, the 1030 ton Dutch freighter Duymaer van Twist and the 7089 ton freighter Tjisaroea were also captured. Takao, Maya and Atago then returned to Yokosuka for a refit with additional anti-aircraft guns, arriving 18 March.

In April, she participated in the unsuccessful pursuit of the Doolittle Raid task force.

On 2 May, Takao assisted in rescue efforts for the seaplane carrier Mizuho, which had been torpedoed by the US submarine USS Drum off of Omaezaki. Takao rescued 471 crew from the sinking ship .

In June 1942, Takao and Maya supported the invasion of the Aleutian Islands, protecting the convoy for Kiska and providing fire support for landings on Attu. On 3 June 1942, their reconnaissance floatplanes were attacked by USAAF Curtiss P-40 fighters from Umnak and two were shot down; on 5 June, Takao shot down a B-17 Flying Fortress. Takao returned to Ōminato on 24 June.

In August 1942, Takao was assigned to "Operation Ka", the Japanese reinforcement during the Battle of Guadalcanal, departing Hashirajima with Atago and Maya on 11 August for Truk. The cruisers were in the Battle of the Eastern Solomons on 24 August from a distance, and did not see combat. However, during the Battle of the Santa Cruz Islands on 26 October, all three cruisers (together with Myōkō and Haguro) participated in night combat operations resulting in the sinking of the crippled and abandoned American aircraft carrier USS Hornet.

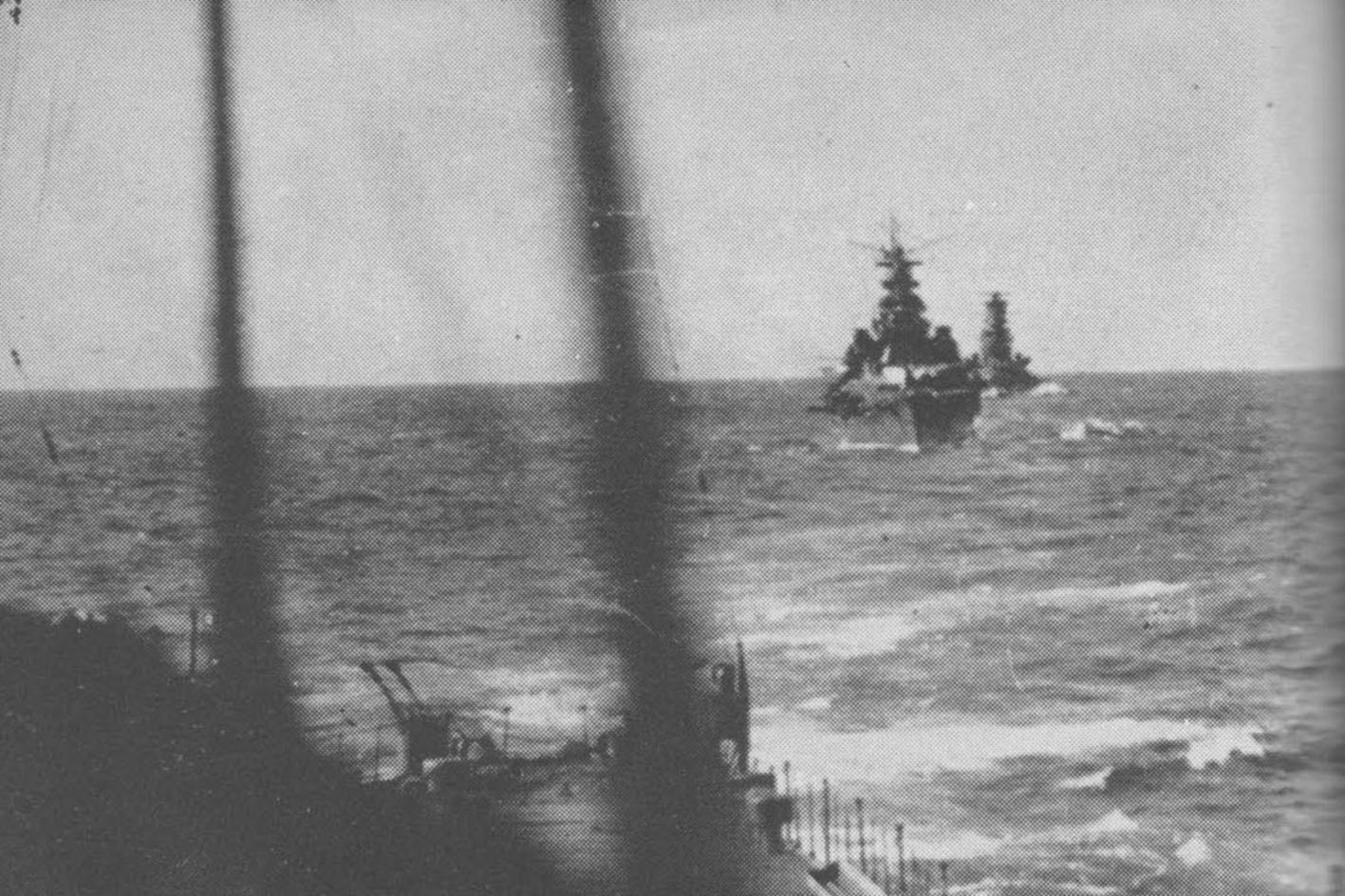
Takao (center) heads towards Guadalcanal on 14 November 1942 followed by the battleship Kirishima (far background) to bombard Henderson Field. Photo taken from Takao's sister ship Atago.

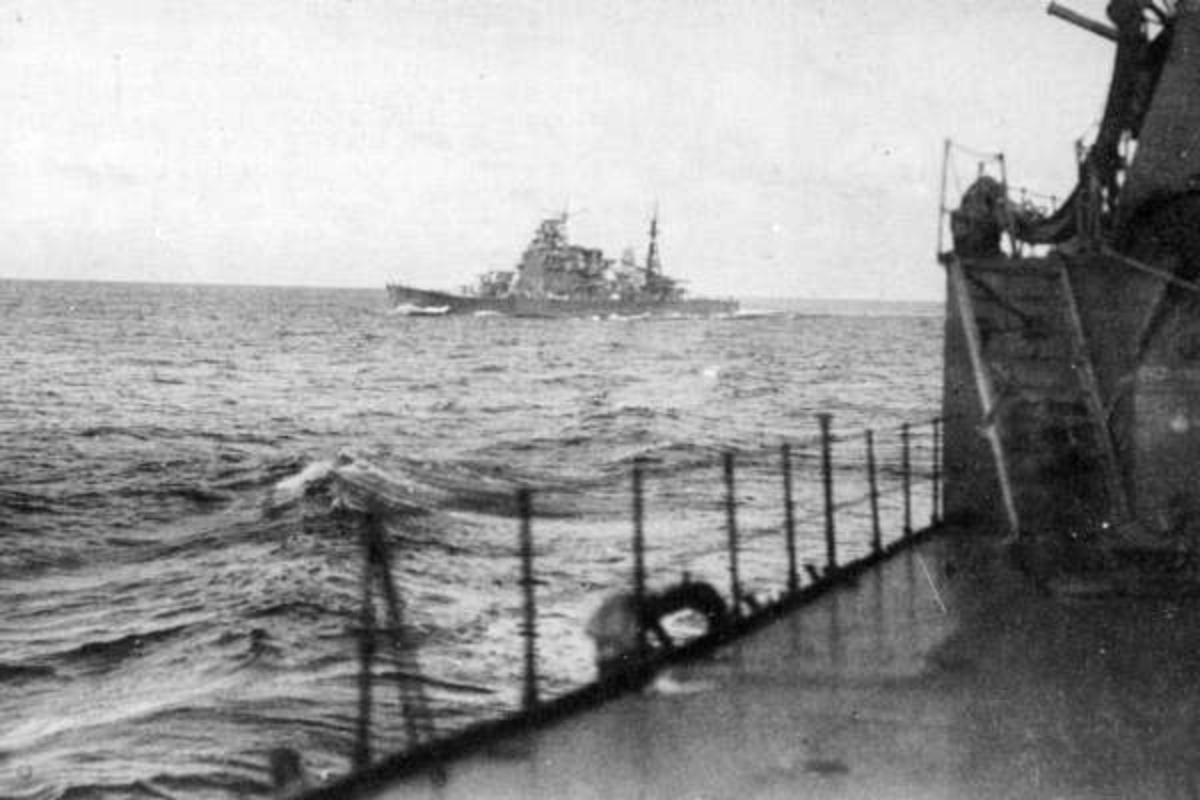
Takao underway at the Solomon Islands in 1942, as seen from Atago

This was followed by a determined attempt to shell the US base at Henderson Field leading to the Naval Battle of Guadalcanal. Early in the morning of 15 November 1942, the battleship Kirishima, supported by Takao and Atago, engaged the American battleships Washington and South Dakota. All three Japanese ships hit South Dakota multiple times with shells, knocking out her radar and fire controls. Takao and Atago fired Long Lance torpedoes at Washington but missed. However, Kirishima was quickly disabled by Washington and sank a few hours later. Atago was damaged. Takao escaped unharmed, but was forced to retreat to Truk, and from there went back to Kure Naval Arsenal for repairs at the end of November, returning to Truk by the end of December.

In early 1943, Takao supported the evacuation of Guadalcanal. The force consisted of the carriers Zuikaku, Zuihō and Jun'yō, the battleships Kongō and Haruna, heavy cruisers Atago, Takao, Myōkō and Haguro, the light cruisers Nagara and Agano, and 11 destroyers. The Japanese transports were successful in evacuating 11,700 troops from the island.

Under the command of Inoguchi Toshihira, Takao operated in the central Pacific from her base at Truk. She returned to Yokosuka Naval Arsenal on 26 July for the installation of additional anti-aircraft guns. After returning to Truk on 23 August, she continued on to Rabaul on 27 August, disembarking army troops and supplies.

In response to American carrier aircraft raiding in the Gilbert Islands, Takao sortied with Vice Admiral Jisaburō Ozawa's fleet to engage the American carriers. The fleet consisted of the aircraft carriers Shōkaku, Zuikaku and Zuihō, the battleships Yamato and Nagato, heavy cruisers Myōkō, Haguro, Tone, Chikuma, Mogami, Atago, Takao, Chōkai and Maya, the light cruiser Agano and fifteen destroyers. Despite extensive searches, this force failed to make contact with the American striking force and returned to Truk.

Takao was refueling at Rabaul when the base was attacked on 5 November 1943 by American carrier aircraft. She was targeted by SBD Dauntless dive bombers from USS Saratoga and hit by two bombs, killing 23 crewmen and damaging her steering. Takao was forced to return to Yokosuka for dry dock repairs. During the repair work, additional anti-aircraft guns were fitted, along with a Type 21 radar. Repairs were not complete until 18 January 1944.

Takao was assigned to Vice Admiral Ozawa’s First Mobile Fleet based at Palau from 1 March 1944, and was stationed at Davao in the southern Philippines from 1 April. She was attacked by the submarine USS Dace on 6 April, but all of her torpedoes missed. On 13 June, during the Battle of the Philippine Sea, Takao was part of Vice Admiral Takeo Kurita’s Mobile Force Vanguard, deployed from Tawi Tawi in an attempt to force the American 5th Fleet into a "decisive battle" off of Saipan. In what came to be called the "Great Marianas Turkey Shoot", Japanese aircraft attacking US Task Force 58 off Saipan suffered severe losses. On 26 June Takao was again at Kure Naval Arsenal, where yet more anti-aircraft guns were installed, as well as a Type 13 air-search radar.

Takao returned to Singapore in mid-July and conducted operations in the vicinity of Singapore and Brunei until mid-October. On 22 October, Takao sortied from Brunei as part of Admiral Kurita's Center Force for the Battle of Leyte Gulf. In the predawn hours of 23 October, the Japanese force was intercepted by two American submarines in the Palawan Passage. Takao was hit by two torpedoes from USS Darter, which shattered two shafts, broke her fantail and flooded three boiler rooms. Atago and Maya were both sunk in the same engagement. Chōkai was lost a few days later at the Battle off Samar, leaving Takao as the sole survivor of her class.

Takao limped back to Brunei, escorted by the destroyers Naganami and Asashimo, the torpedo boat Hiyodori and the transport Mitsu Maru, and on to Singapore by 12 November. Takao was assessed as being unrepairable at Singapore and impossible to tow to Japan. She was therefore moored as a floating anti-aircraft battery defending Seletar Naval Base along with Myōkō, the latter crippled at the Battle of the Sibuyan Sea and then further damaged by a submarine-launched torpedo.

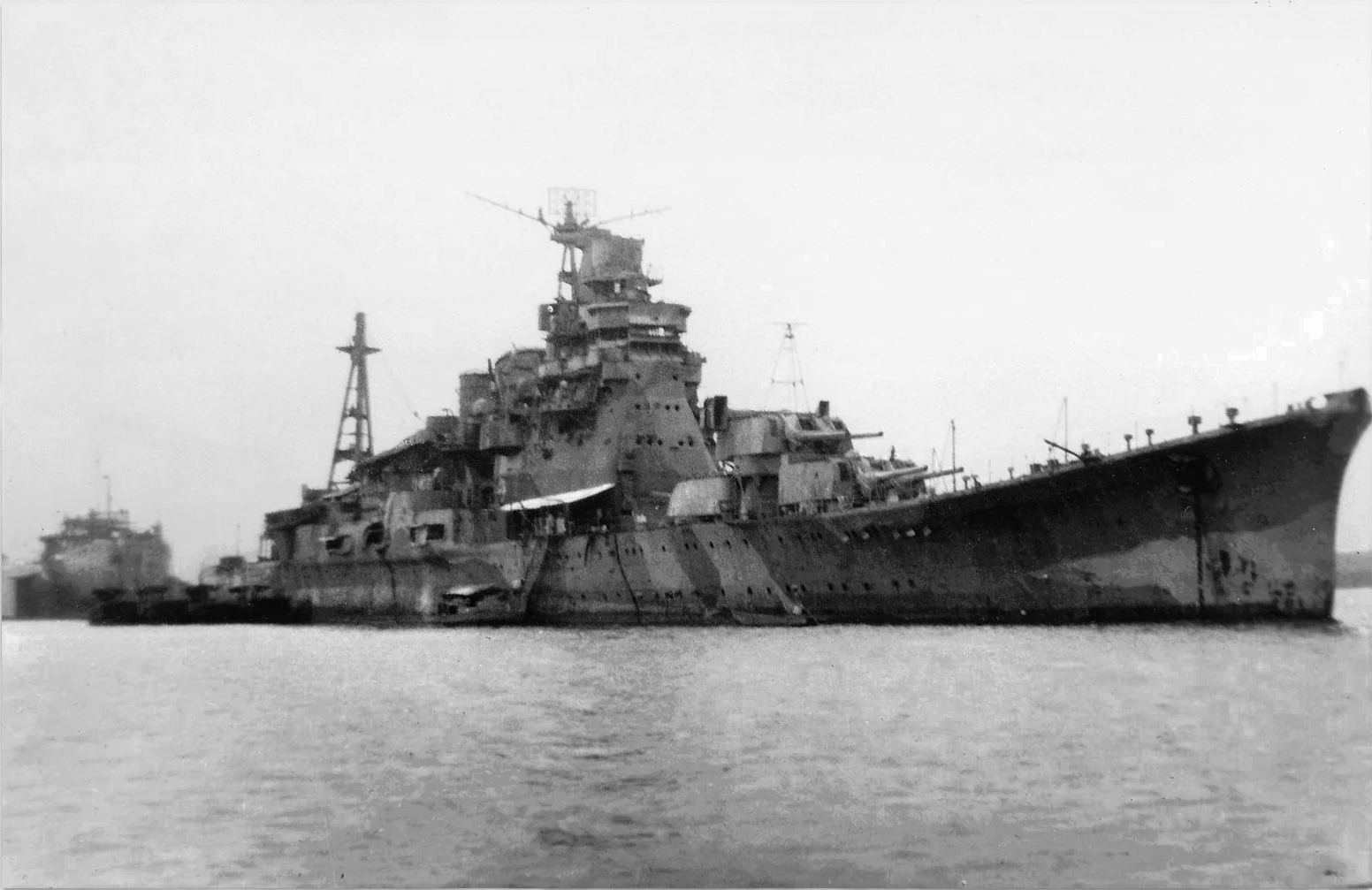
Takao, surrendered to British forces at Singapore, September 1945

Concerned that both cruisers could interfere with Allied forces approaching Singapore, the Royal Navy launched Operation Struggle on 31 July 1945 with the midget submarines HMS XE3 (Lieutenant Ian Edward Fraser) assigned to attack Takao, and HMS XE1 (Lieutenant J. E. Smart) to attack Myōkō. After penetrating the harbor defenses, XE3 maneuvered under Takao, where diver Acting Leading Seaman James Joseph Magennis exited the submarine. The magnets of the limpet mines would not hold them on Takao's hull, which was covered with a thick layer of seaweed, so he attached six limpet mines to the hull using an improvised piece of rope. When the mines exploded, they blew a 20 by 10 metres (66 by 33 ft) hole. Several compartments below the lower deck were flooded, including two ammunition magazines, the main gun plotting room and the lower communications room. Fraser and Magennis were awarded the Victoria Cross. It was discovered after the end of the war that Takao was manned by a skeleton crew and had no ammunition aboard for her 8-inch main armament. Japanese forces surrendered Seletar Naval Base to the British on 21 September 1945. On 27 October 1946, Takao was towed to the Strait of Malacca and was sunk as a target ship by the light cruiser HMS Newfoundland on 29 October 1946 at 03°05′05″N 100°41′00″E. She was removed from the navy list on 3 May 1947.

== In popular culture ==
Takao has an important role in the 2023 film Godzilla Minus One, in which the United States authorizes the ship to be returned to Japan so that it can defend the country against Godzilla. Takao is repaired at Singapore and sent to the Ogasawara Islands, where it arrives just in time to rescue the crew of the Shinseimaru from Godzilla, injuring and distracting the kaiju using its main guns before being destroyed by Godzilla's atomic breath.

The ship also makes an appearance in the anime Arpeggio of Blue Steel in which she defects from the Fog to help the protagonists.

The ship is also a playable character in the smartphone gacha games Azur Lane, Kantai Collection, and other similar themed titles.
