= Helensburgh =

Town in Argyll and Bute, Scotland

Coordinates: 56.0166°N 4.7333°W

Helensburgh: Scottish Gaelic: Baile Eilidh
- Town and former burgh
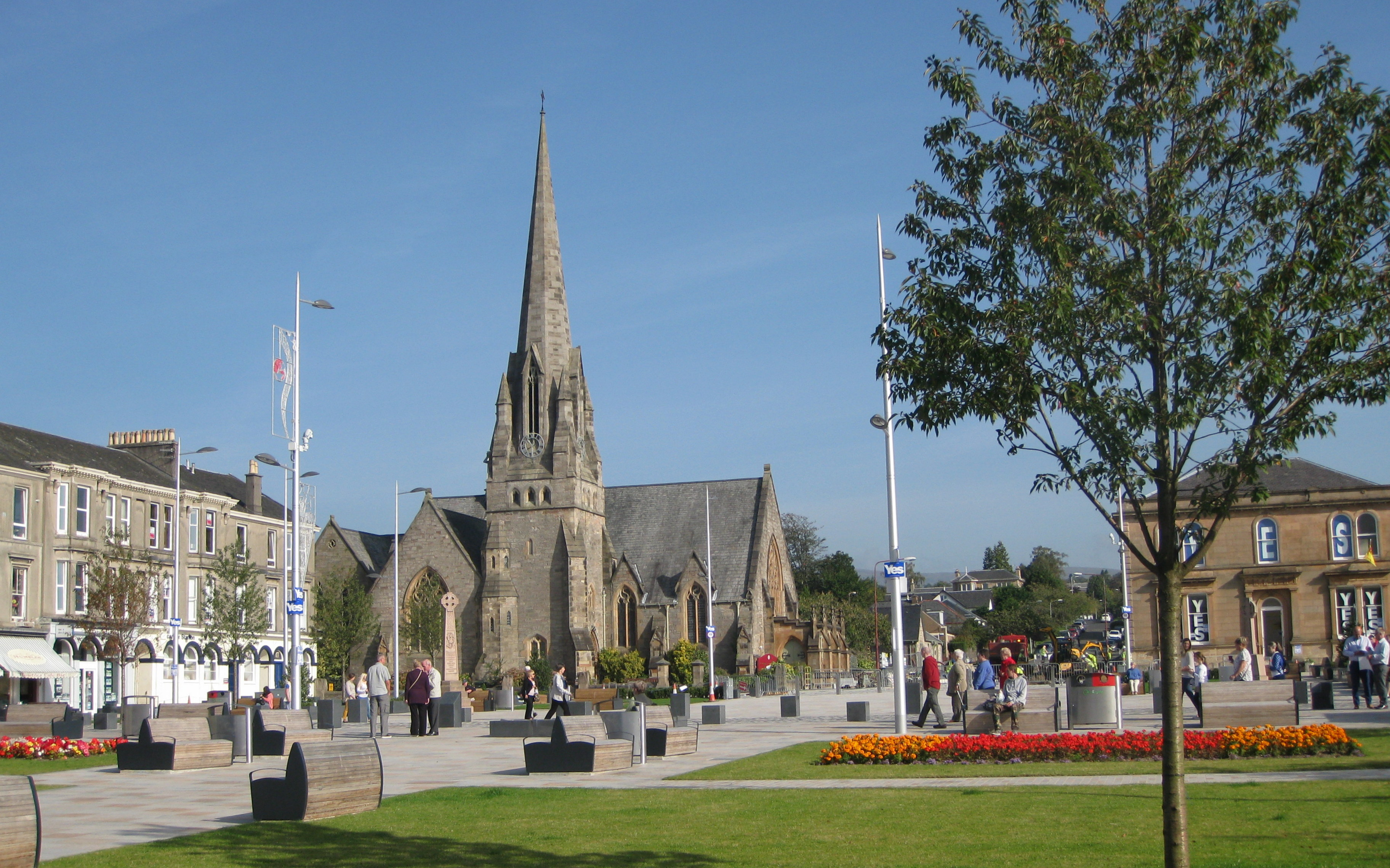
- Colquhoun Square, showing plinths for the Outdoor Museum

- Location within Argyll and Bute
- Area: 5.24 km^{2} (2.02 sq mi)
- Population: 14,127 (2022)
  - Density: 2,696/km^{2} (6,980/sq mi)
- OS grid reference: NS298833
  - Edinburgh: 61 mi (98 km) E
  - London: 363 mi (586 km) SSE
- Council area: Argyll and Bute
- Lieutenancy area: Dunbartonshire
- Country: Scotland
- Sovereign state: United Kingdom
- Post town: HELENSBURGH
- Postcode district: G84
- Dialling code: 01436
- Police: Scotland
- Fire: Scottish
- Ambulance: Scottish
- UK Parliament: Argyll, Bute and South Lochaber
- Scottish Parliament: Dumbarton

Helensburgh (/ˈhɛlənzbərə/ HEL-ənz-bər-ə; Scottish Gaelic: Baile Eilidh) is a town and former burgh on the north side of the Firth of Clyde in Scotland, situated at the mouth of the Gareloch. The town had a population of 14,127 in 2022.

Historically in Dunbartonshire, it became part of Argyll and Bute following local government reorganisation in 1996.

== History ==
=== History context (Prehistoric–1858) ===
Although it has long been known that there are some prehistoric remains in the Helensburgh area, recent fieldwork by the North Clyde Archaeological Society has uncovered more. However, the oldest building in the town itself is Ardencaple Castle, which was the ancestral home of Clan MacAulay, and the history of which may date back to the twelfth century. Today only one tower of this building remains, the rest having been demolished in 1957–59.

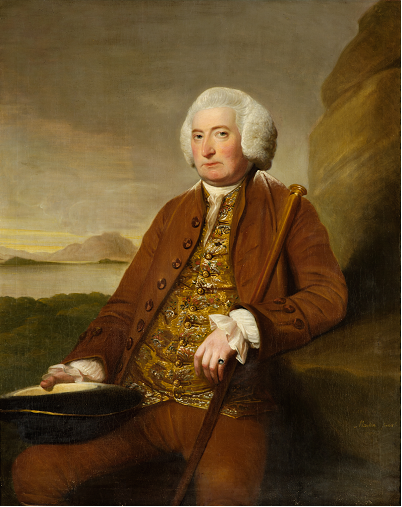
Sir James Colquhoun, who named Helensburgh after his wife

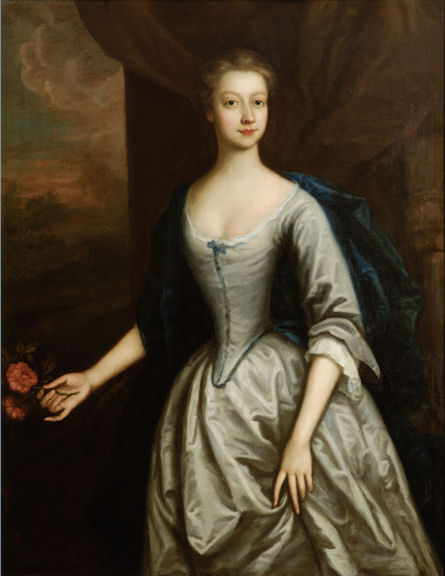
Lady Helen Colquhoun (née Sutherland) after whom the town of Helensburgh is named

In 1752, Sir James Colquhoun (died 1786), chief of the Clan Colquhoun of Luss, bought the land which was to become Helensburgh; at that time it was known by such names as Malig, Millig or Milligs.

In 1776, he placed an advertisement in a Glasgow newspaper seeking to feu the land, and in particular he stated that "bonnet makers, stocking, linen and woolen weavers will meet with encouragement". However, his efforts were unsuccessful, partly because roads were rudimentary and also because the shore at Helensburgh made it unattractive to shipping – it was shallow, dotted with large rocks and subject to a prevailing onshore wind.

No precise date is known for the change of name to Helensburgh. However, it was probably around 1785 when Sir James decided to name the town after his wife, Lady Helen Sutherland (1717–1791); she was the granddaughter of the 16th Earl of Sutherland. However, for a few years, both the old and new names for the town were in use and it was also known for a time simply as the New Town. The town's coat of arms is based on those of the Colquhouns and the Sutherlands.

Helensburgh received its burgh charter from King George III in 1802. This was somewhat surprising, as the 1799 Statistical Account of Scotland indicates that Helensburgh only had a population of about 100 at that time. To commemorate the bicentenary of the burgh charter in 2002 many members of Helensburgh Heritage Trust combined to produce a special history book of the town. Henry Bell (1767–1830) had arrived in Helensburgh by 1806. By training, he was a millwright, but he had also worked for a period in a shipyard at Bo'ness. He probably designed and built the Baths Inn, which he and his wife then ran as a hotel; he designed and built other buildings, such as Dalmonach Works at Bonhill in West Dunbartonshire (now demolished) and St Andrew's Parish Church in Carluke in South Lanarkshire. The Baths Inn later became the Queen's Hotel, and it is now private accommodation as part of Queen's Court at 114 East Clyde Street.

=== Comet ===
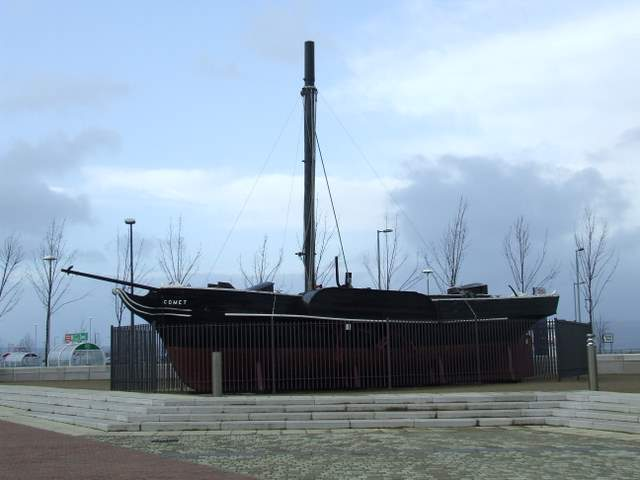
The working replica of the Comet is in Port Glasgow; it was built in 1962 for the 150th anniversary

At that time, the taking of baths (hot and cold, fresh water and salt water) was considered to be advantageous to the health. As a result of his initiative, Helensburgh began to develop as a holiday resort, and Bell also served as the town's first recorded Provost from 1807–09.

When Henry Bell came to Helensburgh, roads to Glasgow were in poor condition and the journey by boat could take several days, depending on the strength and direction of the wind and on tidal conditions. Consequently, in 1812, Henry Bell introduced the paddle steamer Comet to bring guests from Glasgow in comfort and more speedily to his hotel. The Comet was the first commercial steamship in Europe.

That this vessel and subsequent steamships could travel straight into the wind meant that Helensburgh's shallow shore line was a much smaller problem for sailors. As a result, the town began to grow from a population of about 500 in 1810 to 2,229 by the 1841 Census. It is difficult to overstate the importance of Bell in Scottish and British economic history; not only was he a pioneer of tourism, but it can also be argued that the later pre-eminence of the River Clyde in shipbuilding was in no small measure due to him.

=== Railway revolution ===
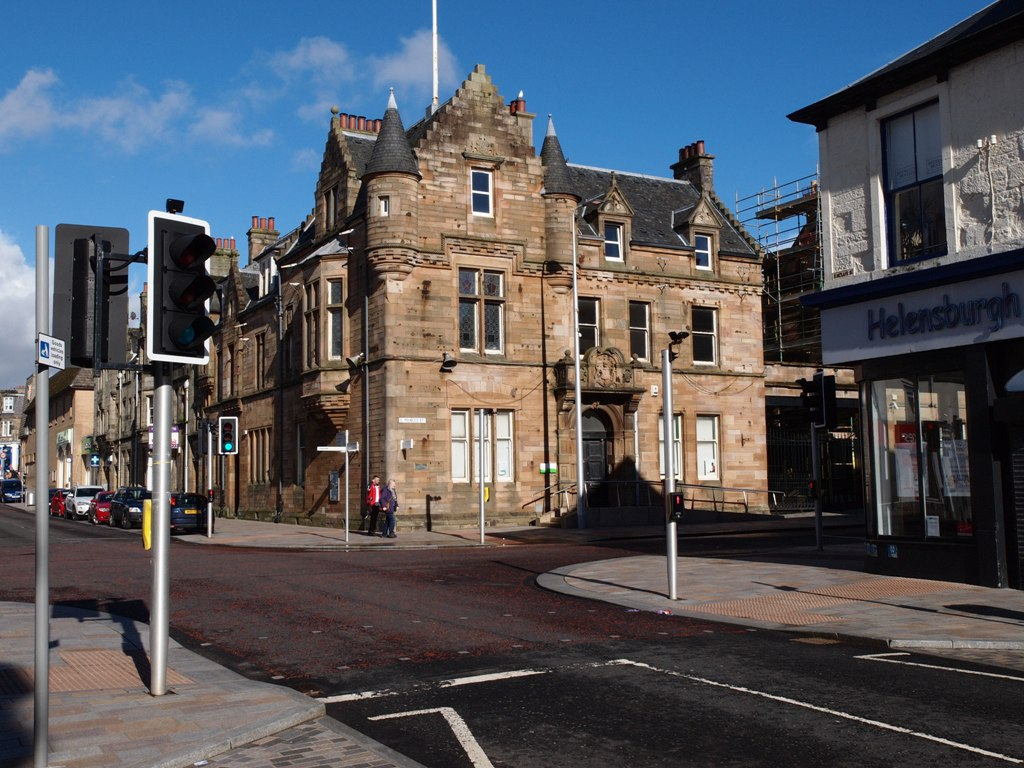
The Municipal Buildings in Princes Street East

Following the arrival of the Glasgow, Dumbarton and Helensburgh Railway in 1858 the population of Helensburgh grew even more rapidly, reaching 5,964 in the 1871 Census. The Municipal Buildings, designed by John Honeyman, were completed in 1879.

Glasgow at this time was developing very rapidly as an industrial city, but this rapid growth caused it to become dirty, smoky and unpleasant. The railway meant that the wealthier business people of Glasgow could now set up home in the fresh air of Helensburgh and commute daily between the two places. This led to the expansion of the town northwards up the hill and the building of many substantial Victorian villas. The best known of these is The Hill House, which was designed in 1902–03 by Glasgow architect Charles Rennie Mackintosh and which now belongs to the National Trust for Scotland. These parts of the town are laid out in the gridiron pattern, Helensburgh being an early example of a planned town in Scotland.

In 1960, the line from Helensburgh Central to Glasgow Queen Street Low Level and on to Airdrie was electrified with the then revolutionary new Blue Trains providing faster, regular interval services. Unfortunately, equipment problems led to the temporary withdrawal of the Blue Trains, which did not return to traffic until late 1961. Since then, traffic on this route has risen steadily, helped from October 2010 when two trains each hour commenced running right through to Edinburgh via the newly re-opened (and electrified) Airdrie-Bathgate line.

By the late 1870s, the North British Railway Company (which had become owner of the Glasgow, Dumbarton and Helensburgh Railway) felt that its steamer services were at a competitive disadvantage, because passengers had to walk from Helensburgh Station, through the town centre and down the pier, thus causing longer journey times. By contrast, their competitors on the other side of the Clyde, the Caledonian Railway and the Glasgow & South Western Railway had stations right beside their piers. The North British therefore proposed to extend the railway line through the town centre from the station on to the pier.

This proposal split opinion in the town down the middle, with Parliament ultimately deciding against it. Consequently, the North British Railway Company decided to build its "station in the sea" at Craigendoran just outside the eastern boundary of the town, and this opened in 1882. Shipping services stopped in 1972 but Craigendoran railway station remains in use. In 1894, the West Highland Railway (a subsidiary of the North British Railway by then) was opened from Craigendoran junction to Fort William, with a new station at Helensburgh Upper. This new railway had no significant effect on the population of the town, but it did alter its appearance, with the construction of a substantial embankment up the hill from Craigendoran and of a deep cutting on the approaches to Helensburgh Upper.

=== World War I and II ===
There are 205 men and 1 woman named on Helensburgh's war memorial in Hermitage Park. In 2020, the Helensburgh War Memorial Project published its researches and added a further 59 "missing names" to the list; all were men. It also gave a variety of explanations as to why these names were not on the war memorial. If the 1911 census is used, which recorded a population of 8,529, then it can be calculated that Helensburgh lost three percent of its population to the war. This is a particularly significant portion when it is considered that women, children, and elders, amongst other demographics, were not conscripted for the front line. It is thought that a similar number suffered serious physical and mental injuries.

When the Second World War broke out in 1939 the British Government was concerned that London and other ports in the south of England would become the targets for German bombing. Consequently, they decided to build two military ports in Scotland which would be more difficult for German bombers to reach. In 1941, Military Port Number 1 opened at Faslane on the Gareloch, 5 miles (8 km) from Helensburgh. A railway was built linking Faslane to the West Highland Line. A vast tonnage of wartime supplies was moved through Faslane, and it was also used as a port for troop movements. Much of the area around Helensburgh was taken over by both British and American Armed Forces for a variety of wartime activities.

After the end of the War, Faslane was split in two. The southern half was used by the Royal Navy and the northern half for shipbreaking until 1980. In 1957 the Royal Navy closed its submarine base in Rothesay Bay and transferred it to Faslane. Six years later the British Government decided to buy seaborne nuclear weapons from the United States and to base them in submarines at Faslane which became known as the Clyde Submarine Base. This decision had a substantial impact on Helensburgh and the surrounding area particularly with the provision of housing for naval personnel. A further increase in the town's population resulted, it rising to 15,852 in the 1991 Census. From 1996, surface vessels have also been based there, and this caused a change of the official name to Her Majesty's Naval Base Clyde.

The Annual Report of the Fishery Board for 1913 provides an insight into fishing from Helensburgh in the Firth of Clyde at that time. They caught codlings, haddocks, whitings, flounders, mussels and winkles.

Fishery Statistics

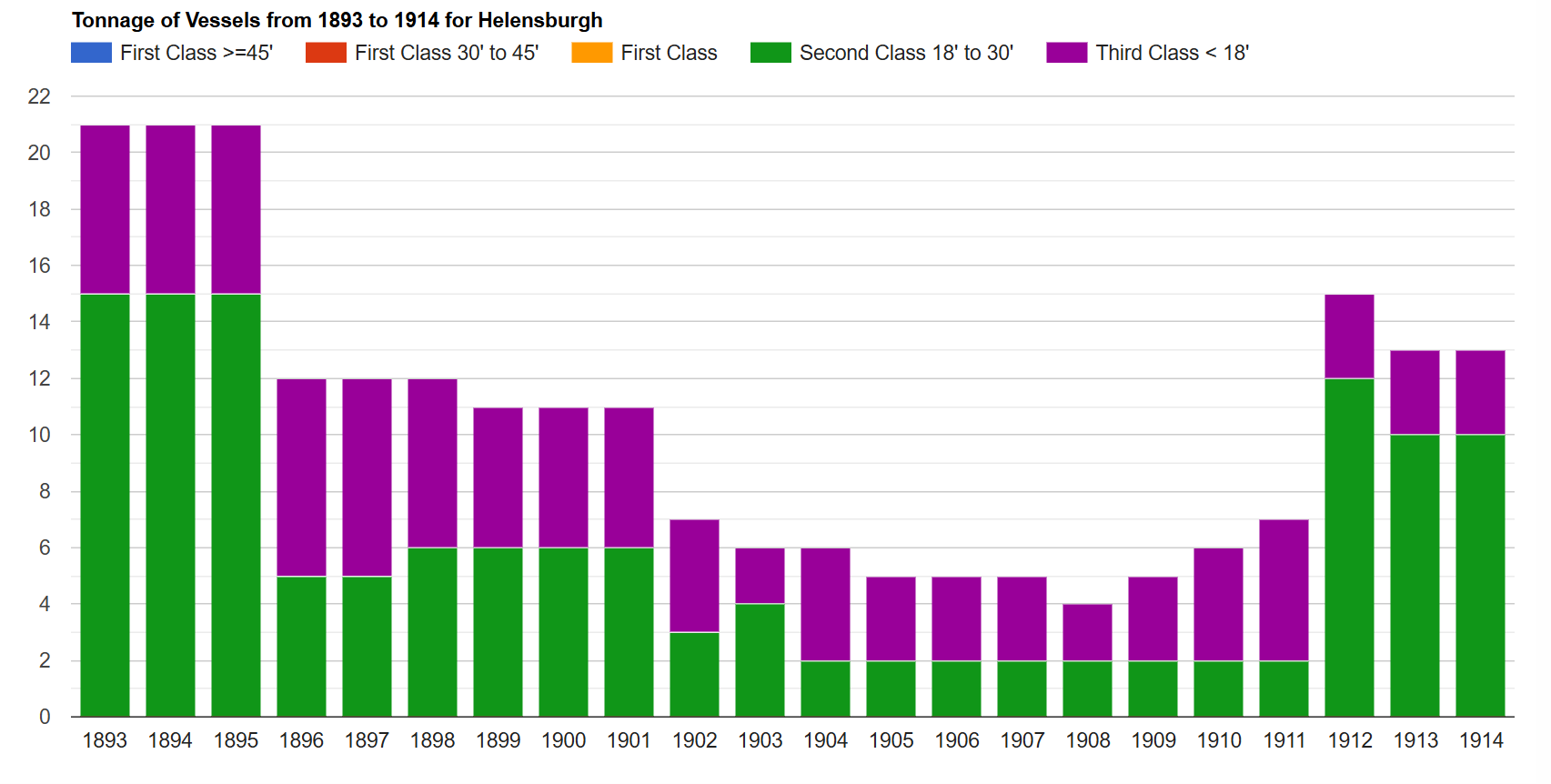
Tonnage of vessels

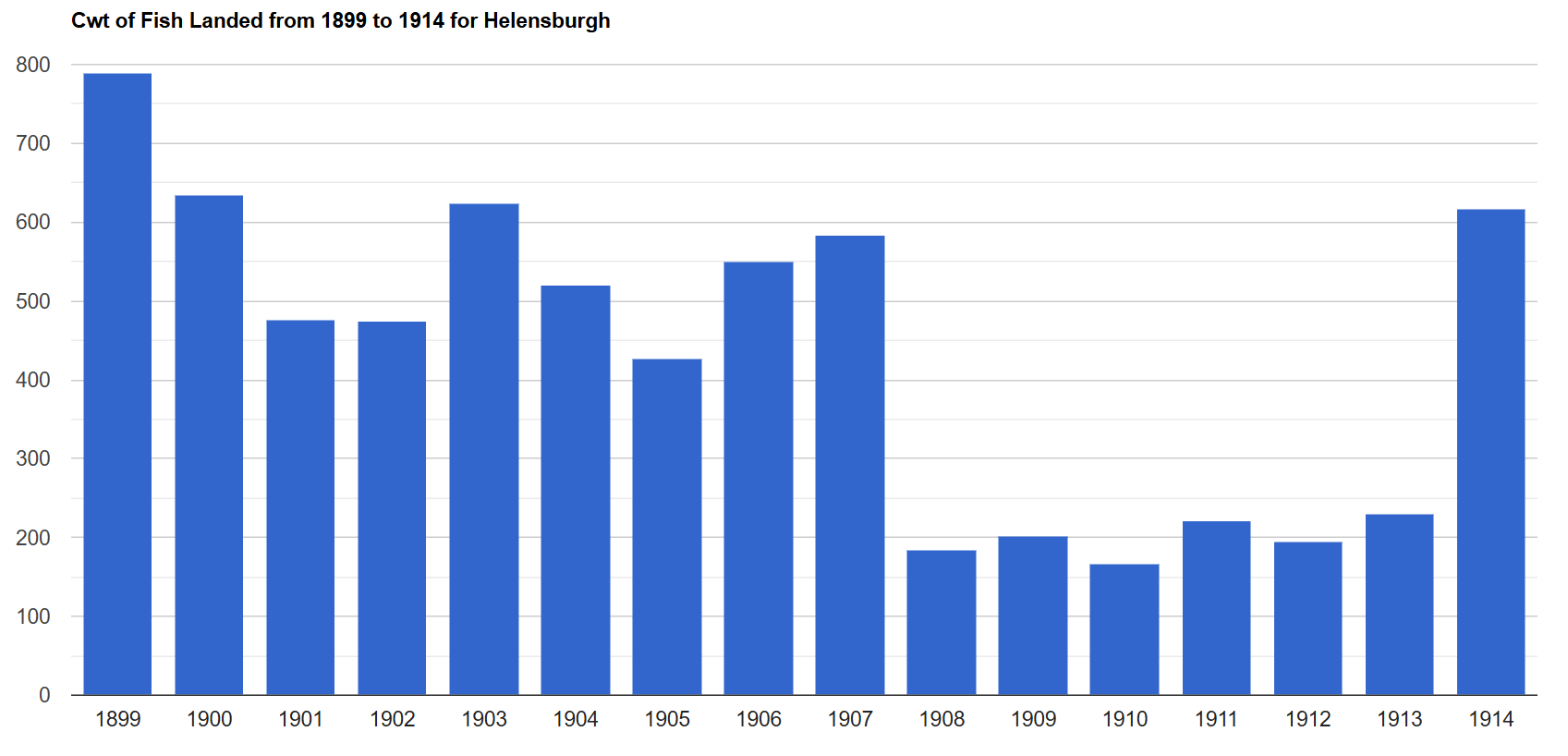
Cwt of fish landed (excluding shellfish)

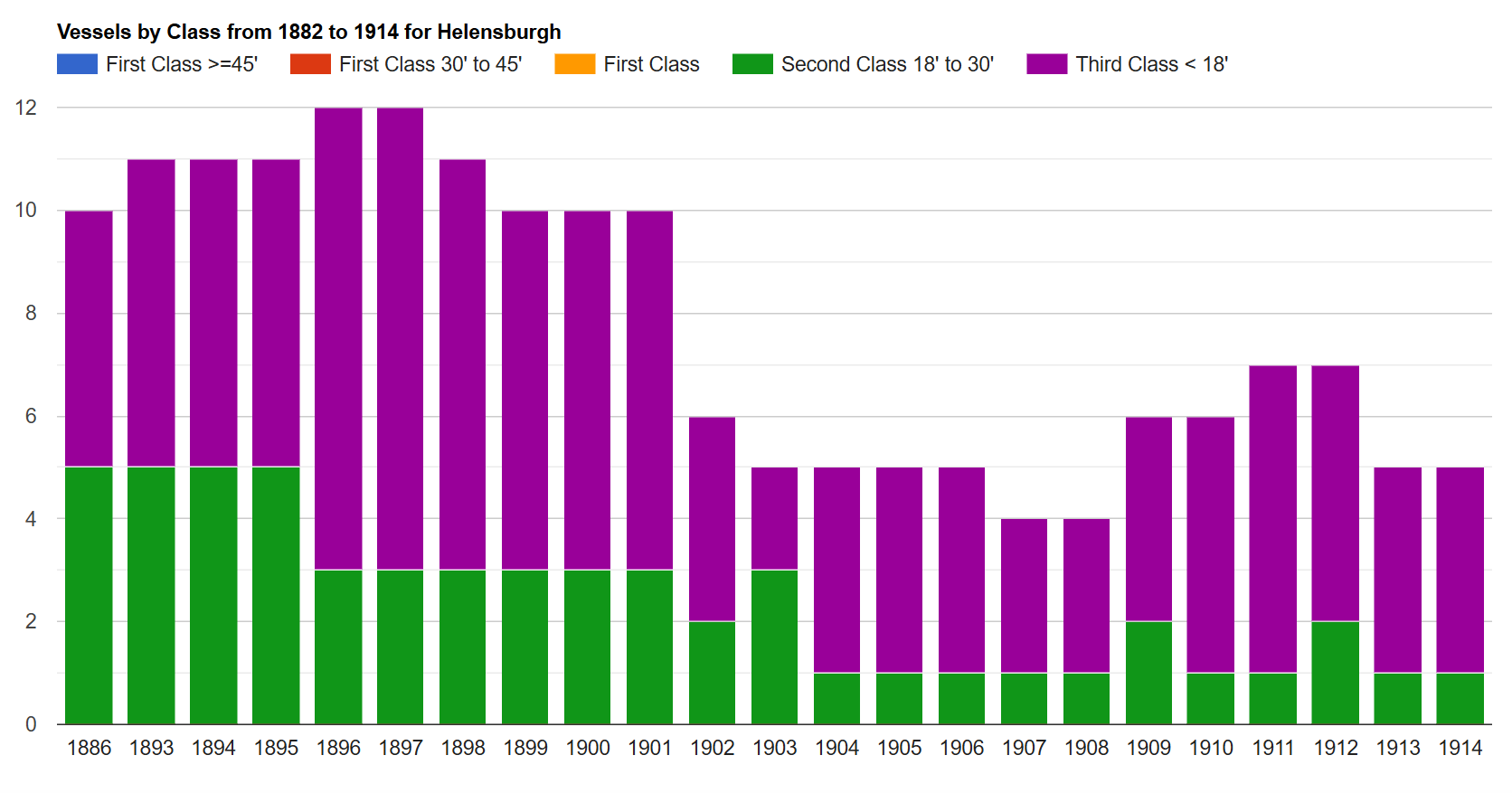
Vessels by class

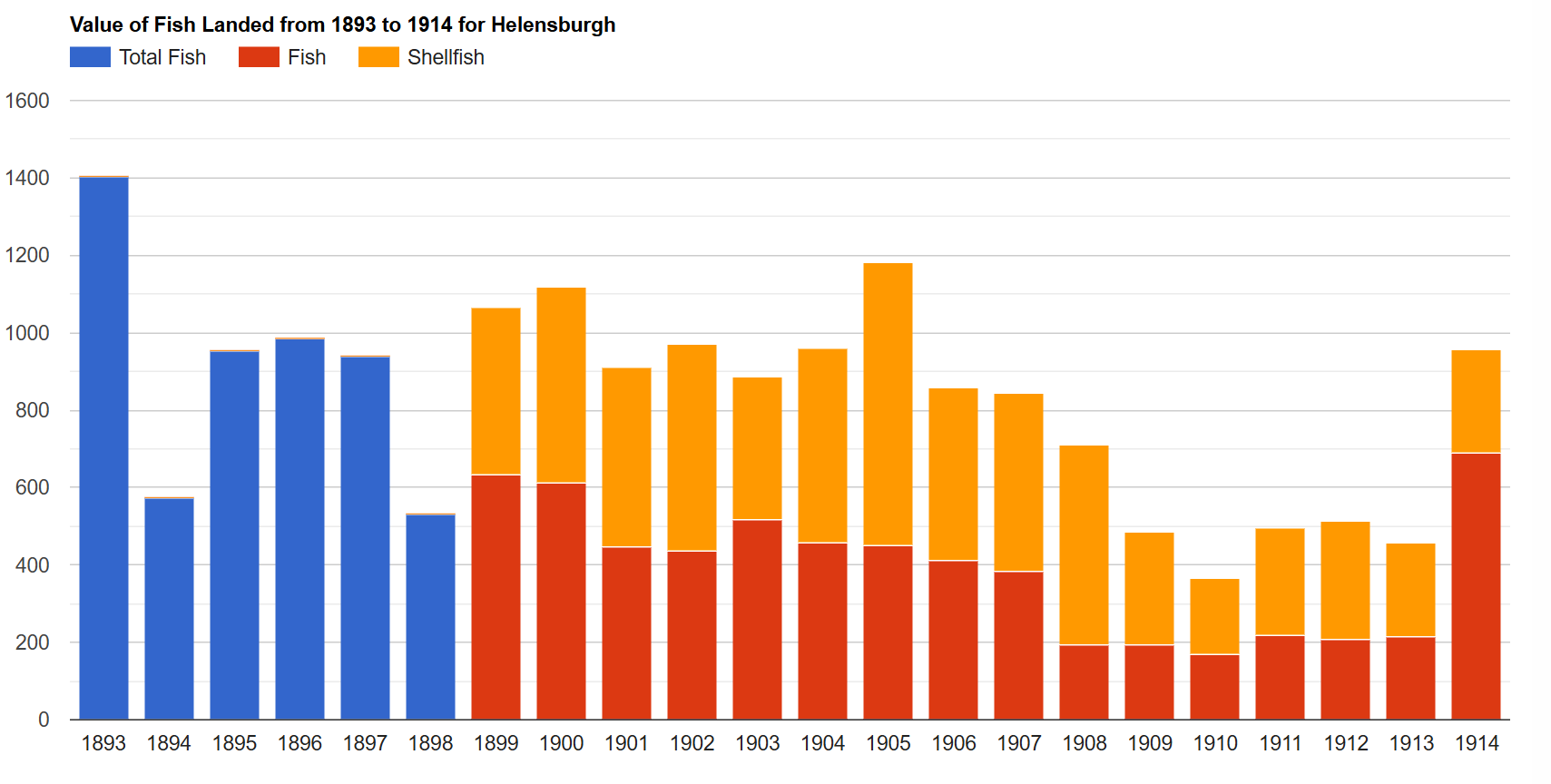
Value (£) of fish landed

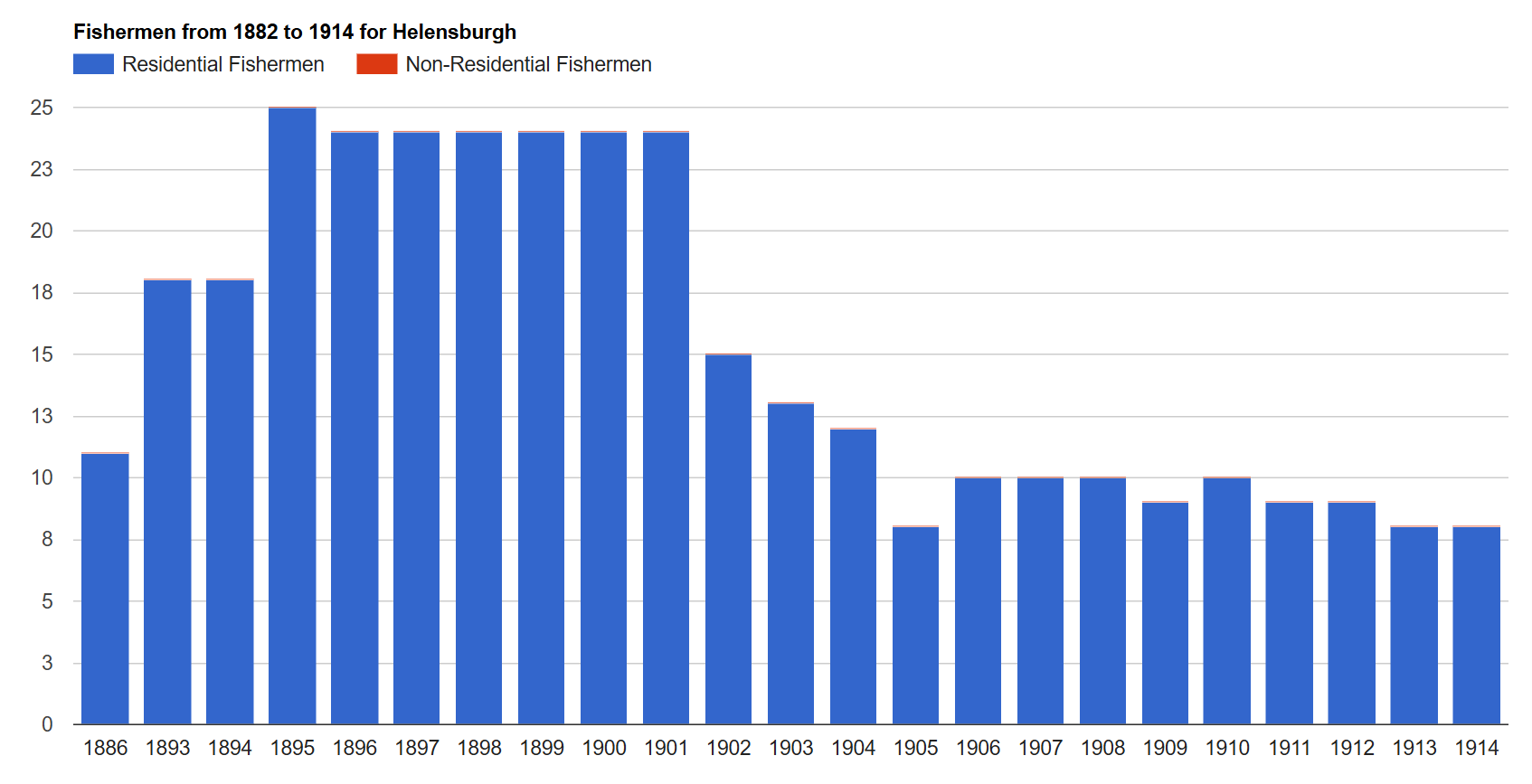
Fishermen

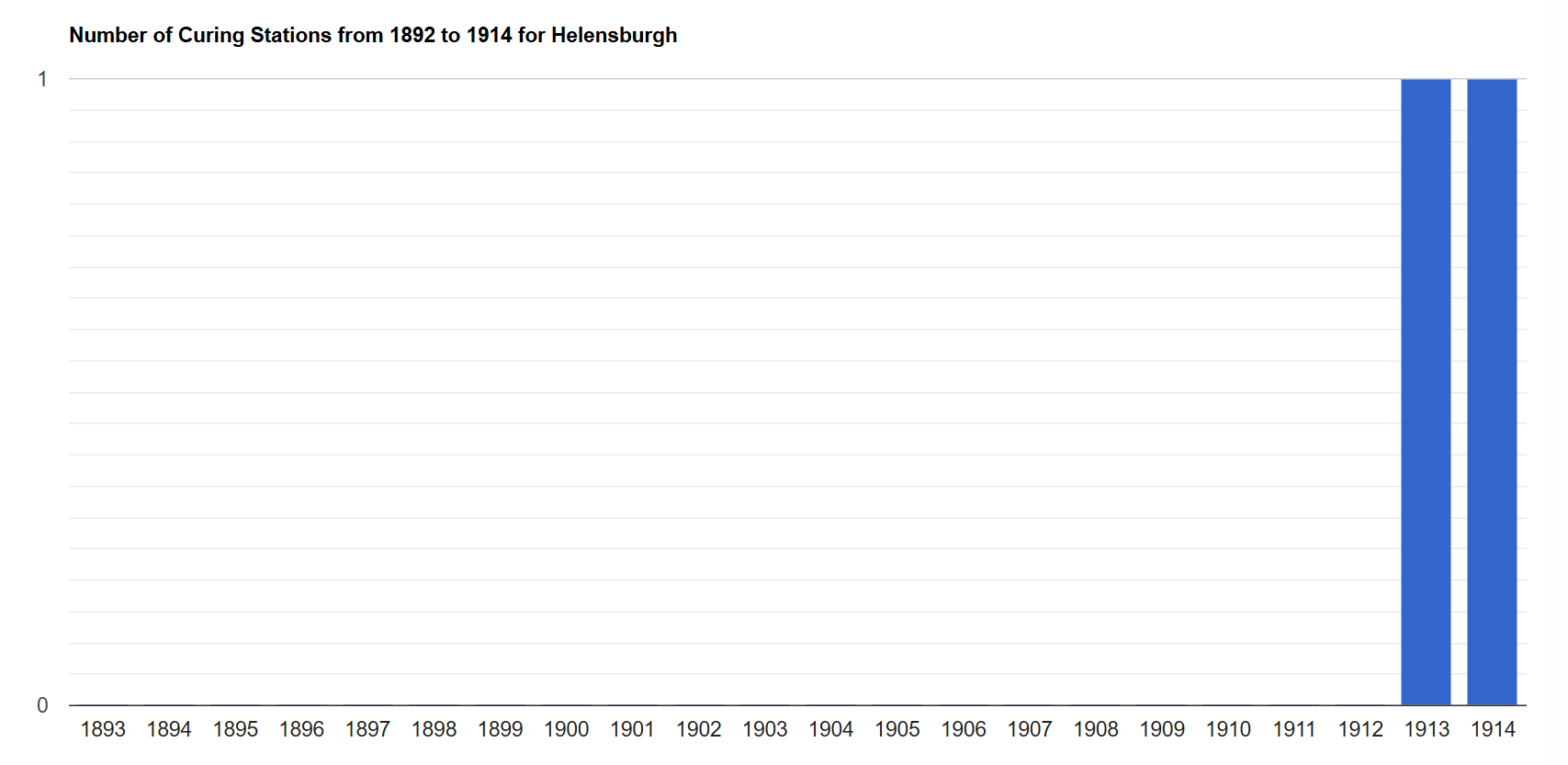
Number of curing stations

=== Recent history and regeneration ===
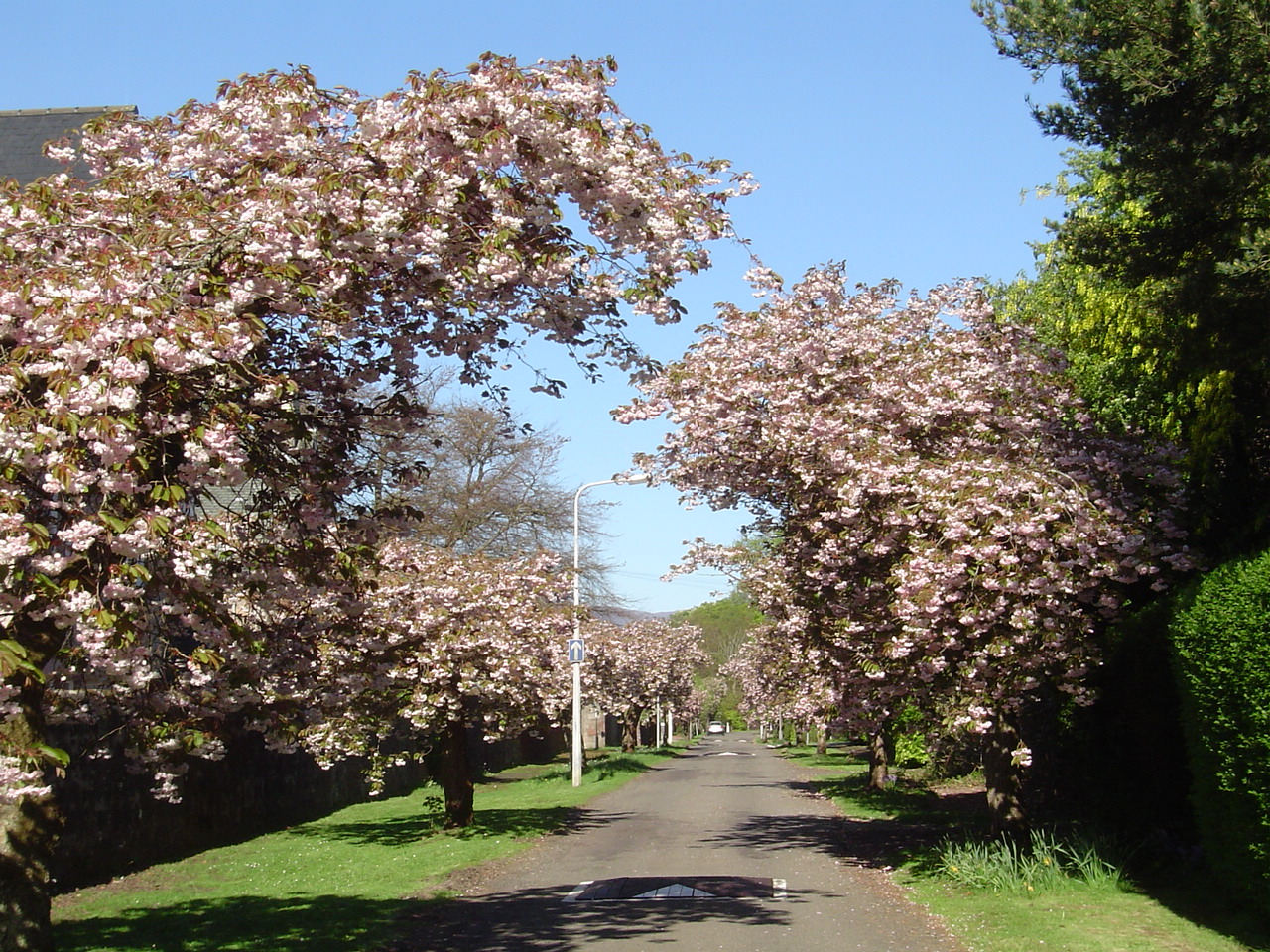
Cherry blossom in Stafford Street

In 1971, Helensburgh was given its first conservation area, covering The Hill House and Helensburgh Upper Station. This was joined in 1994 by The Upper Helensburgh Conservation Area, which includes architectural works by William Leiper and Baillie Scott, and, in 2019, by the Town Centre Conservation Area.

In a 2006 survey, Helensburgh was shown to be the second most expensive town in which to buy property in Scotland.

The town contains many tree-lined streets, and the cherry blossom in the Spring is a particular feature; a consequence is that the town has been referred to as "the Garden City of the Clyde". In 2016, the Helensburgh Tree Conservation Trust was invited to become a member of The National Tree Collections of Scotland because the range and quality of its street trees; at the time no other Scottish town had received this accolade.

In 2015, Colquhoun Square underwent a major redesign (as part of a wider redevelopment project that included the west esplanade) where parts of the square were pedestrianised. An integral part of this redesign was the creation of the award-winning Outdoor Museum, which consisted of the erection of 120 plinths, which over time would be gradually filled with items or replicas connected with Helensburgh's history and character, including a puppet's head used by John Logie Baird in his first television experiments and the ship's bell from Henry Bell's paddle steamer Comet. In addition, a number of brass plaques have been set into the pavements and these give a description of the condition of the streets of the town in 1845.

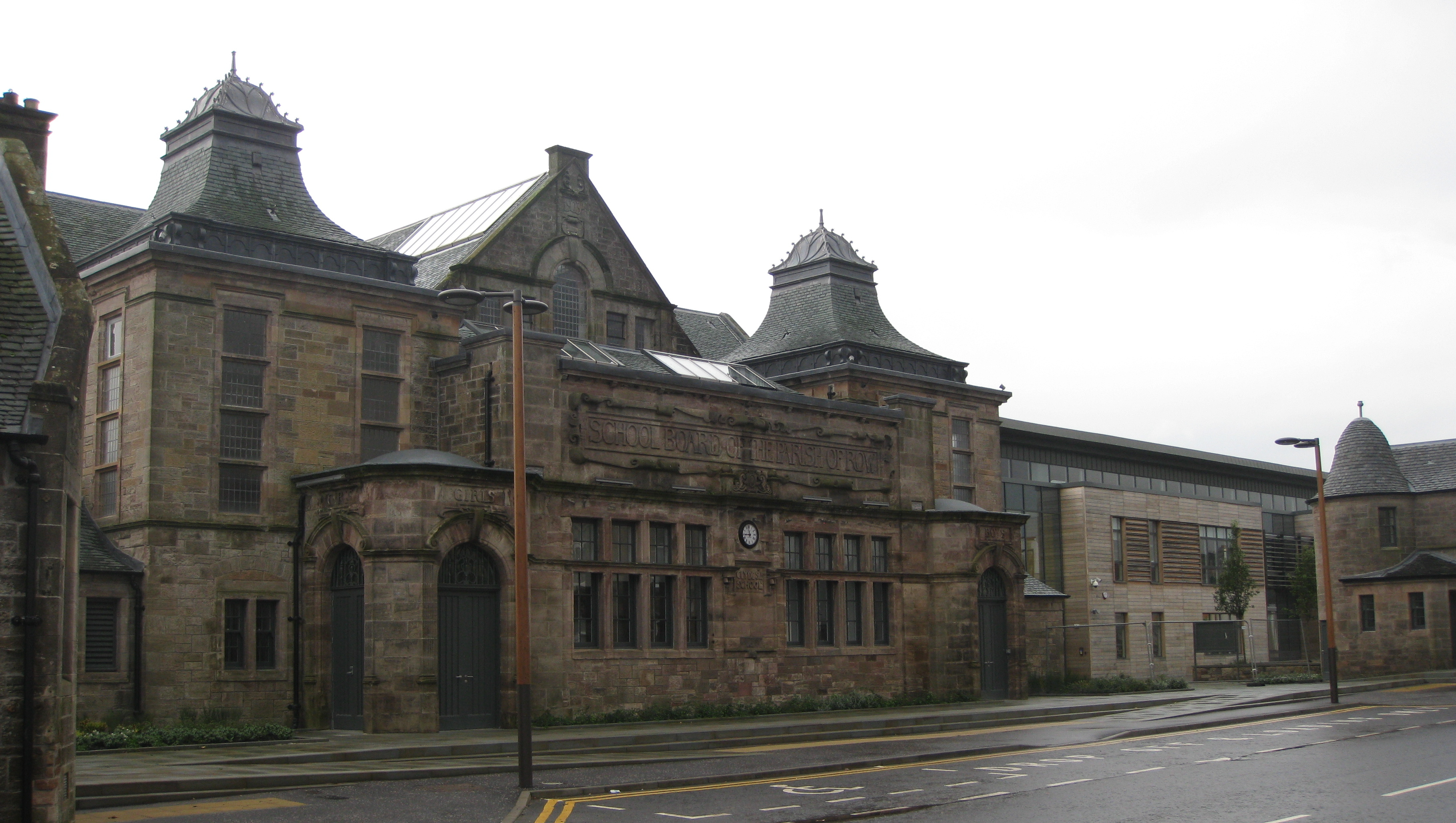
Helensburgh & Lomond Civic Centre (originally Clyde Street School)

That same year, the previously derelict Clyde Street School reopened as the Helensburgh and Lomond Civic Centre of Argyll and Bute Council after significant renovations and the addition of both a new wing and public cafe. Displays from the collections of Helensburgh Heritage Trust can also be seen there.

The Tower Digital Arts Centre, housed in the former St Columba Church on Sinclair Street, was converted in 2016 into a first release double screen cinema and arts centre for the town. The West King Street Hall next door was converted and took on a new role two years later as the Scottish Submarine Centre. The Centre now houses the last (1955) Stickleback-class submarine built for the Royal Navy.

In 2016, proof was found that a building long suspected of having been designed by Charles Rennie Mackintosh, was actually his work. It was built as the Helensburgh & Gareloch Conservative Club, and the top floor only of this large building is now known as the Mackintosh Club. It is located in the town centre at 40 Sinclair Street.

Three years later, Helensburgh's other Mackintosh work, the Hill House, became enclosed in a protective structure, known as "The Box", a cautionary measure intended to slow down damages caused by damp penetration by allowing for the building to dry out. The design of The Box is notable for its chainmail mesh walls as well as the internal walkways that allow visitors to view Hill House's exterior from elevated viewpoints.

In June 2021, a pavilion was added to Hermitage Park, marking the end of a four-year project. The Park Pavilion is a Passivhaus design, believed to be the first non-domestic Passivhaus building in Scotland.

In October the following year, a £22 million leisure centre was officially opened on the Helensburgh pier, replacing the previous swimming pool which had closed two months prior. The building's roof was heavily damaged by Storm Éowyn in January 2025.

== Geography and geology ==
Helensburgh is 25 miles (40 km) northwest of Glasgow. The town faces south towards Greenock across the Firth of Clyde, which is approximately 3 miles (5 km) wide at this point. Ocean-going ships can call at Greenock, but the shore at Helensburgh is very shallow, although to the west of the town the Gareloch is deep.

Helensburgh lies at the western mainland end of the Highland Boundary Fault. This means that the hills to the north of Helensburgh lie in the Highlands, whereas the land to the south of Helensburgh is in the Lowlands or Central Belt of Scotland. Consequently, there is a wide variety of landscape in the surrounding area – for example, Loch Lomond (part of Scotland's first National Park) is only 4 miles (6.4 km) over the hill to the north-east of Helensburgh. Although the Highland Boundary Fault is not geologically active, very minor earthquakes do occur occasionally in the area.

During the last ice age, the weight of the ice pushed the land downwards. Consequently, when the ice melted, sea levels were higher than they are now. Evidence of this can clearly be seen in Helensburgh where the first two blocks of streets nearer the sea are built on a raised beach. Behind them the land rises up quite steeply for one block and then rises more gently – and this is a former sea cliff which has been eroded. The land, now free of the weight of the ice, is slowly rising up, and the minor local earthquakes reflect this.

Further evidence of the last ice age can also be seen at low tide, where the beach is dotted with large boulders known as glacial erratics – these were carried from a distance inside the glaciers and dropped into their current locations when the glaciers melted.

== Climate ==
Helensburgh has an oceanic climate (Köppen: Cfb).

Climate data for Helensburgh (0 m asl, averages 1991–2020)
Month	Jan	Feb	Mar	Apr	May	Jun	Jul	Aug	Sep	Oct	Nov	Dec	Year
Mean daily maximum °C (°F)	6.6 (43.9)	6.9 (44.4)	8.5 (47.3)	11.2 (52.2)	14.4 (57.9)	16.5 (61.7)	18.0 (64.4)	17.6 (63.7)	15.5 (59.9)	12.0 (53.6)	9.0 (48.2)	6.8 (44.2)	11.9 (53.5)
Mean daily minimum °C (°F)	1.4 (34.5)	1.2 (34.2)	2.1 (35.8)	3.7 (38.7)	5.9 (42.6)	8.9 (48.0)	10.8 (51.4)	10.7 (51.3)	8.8 (47.8)	6.0 (42.8)	3.6 (38.5)	1.4 (34.5)	5.4 (41.7)
Average rainfall mm (inches)	180.0 (7.09)	150.7 (5.93)	137.1 (5.40)	87.1 (3.43)	85.2 (3.35)	99.1 (3.90)	112.1 (4.41)	131.2 (5.17)	133.2 (5.24)	172.3 (6.78)	165.7 (6.52)	189.1 (7.44)	1,642.8 (64.66)
Average rainy days (≥ 1 mm)	18.9	16.8	15.7	13.8	13.0	14.2	14.9	16.2	15.3	17.9	19.2	18.4	194.3
Mean monthly sunshine hours	36.7	63.6	97.2	143.6	187.5	141.1	143.1	141.6	109.9	77.8	50.6	32.6	1,225.3
Source: Met Office

== Transport ==
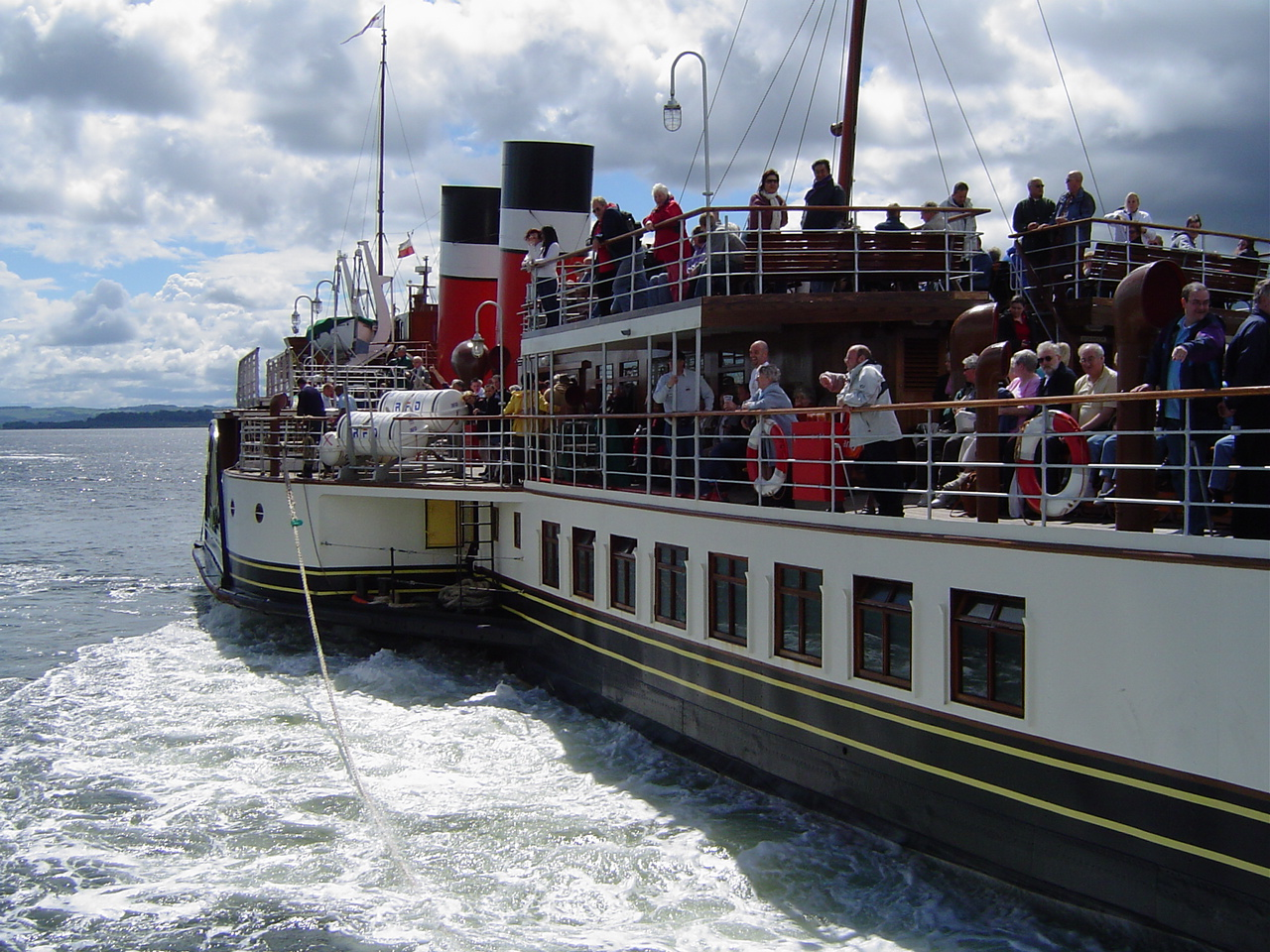
The paddle steamer Waverley leaving Helensburgh pier

The town is served by three railway stations: Helensburgh Central, Craigendoran, and Helensburgh Upper. Both Helensburgh Central and Craigendoran form part of the North Clyde Line, with Helensburgh Central acting as a terminus. Helensburgh Upper, meanwhile, is positioned on the West Highland Line and accommodates the Caledonian Sleeper.

Helensburgh is also served by a number of buses. These provide links to the Vale of Leven and Carrick Castle.

A special local form of transport is the paddle steamer Waverley, which used to call in to Helensburgh pier during summer sailings. It advertises itself as the last sea-going paddle steamer in the world and was launched in 1946 for service from Craigendoran pier; however Craigendoran pier is now derelict, services having been withdrawn in 1972. Towards the end of 2018, Helensburgh pier was closed to all maritime craft because of its poor condition, and so there is no certainty as to when calls by the "Waverley" will resume.

== Demographics ==
=== Population and employment ===
In 2022, Helensburgh had a population of 14,127 inhabitants. Today, it acts as a commuter town for nearby Glasgow, and also serves as a main shopping centre for the area and for tourists and day trippers attracted to the town's seaside location. Helensburgh is also influenced by the presence of the Clyde Naval Base at Faslane on the Gareloch, which is home to the United Kingdom's submarine fleet with their nuclear weapons, as well as a major local employer.

=== Religion ===
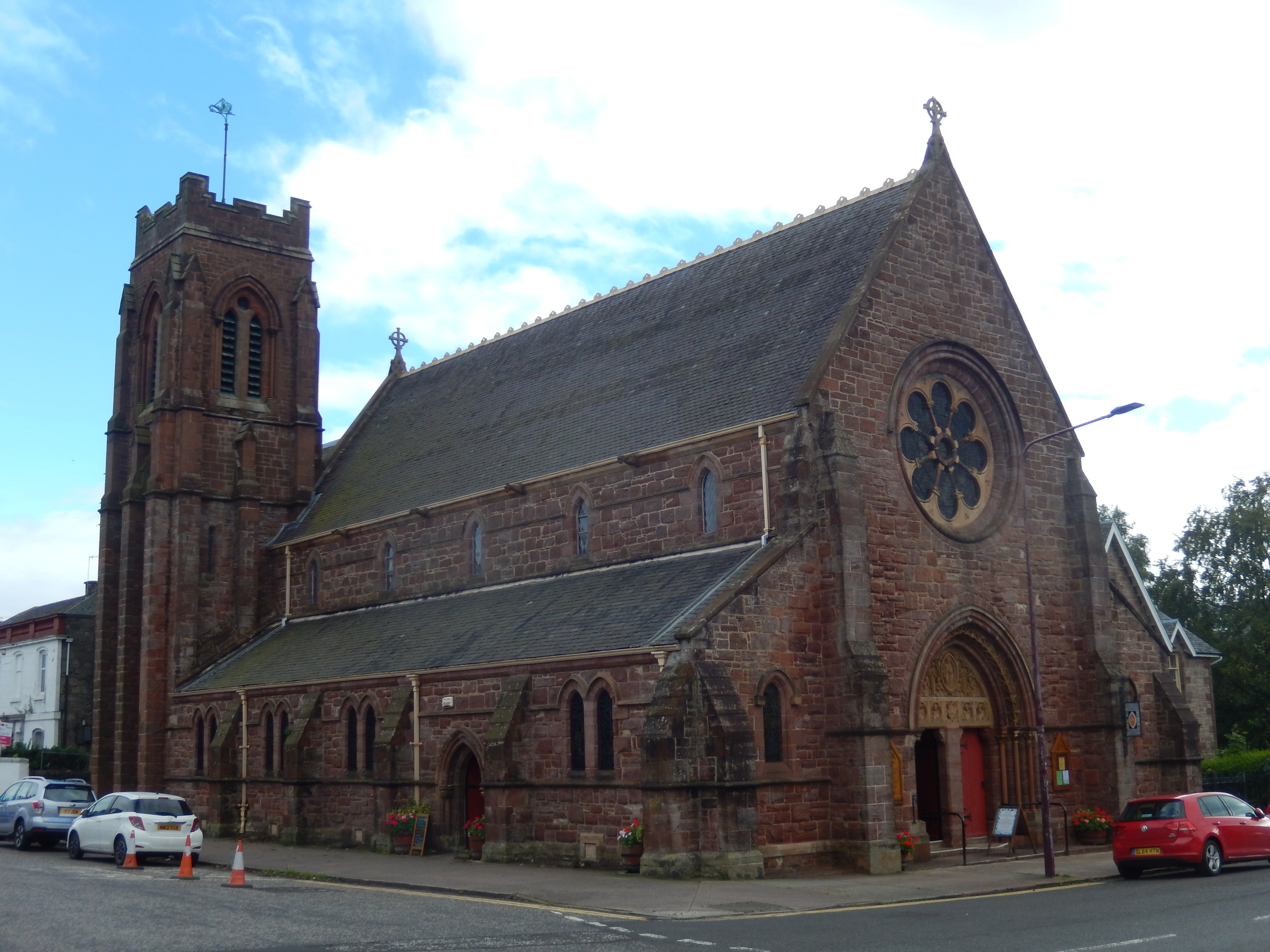
St Michael and All Angels Church

Most of the major Scottish Christian denominations have churches in Helensburgh. The biggest of these was the Church of Scotland which by 1880 had 5 congregations in the town, each with its own building. However, with falling church attendances, and a vision to rationalise resources to better enable mission, these had all merged by 2015, so that the only Church of Scotland congregation is Helensburgh Parish Church in Colquhoun Square. Helensburgh is the largest Church of Scotland Parish in Scotland.

The Scottish Catholic Church has a significant influence within the town, with a parish church named St Joseph's on Lomond Street. St Joseph's church hall was originally the parish church in Helensburgh.

The St. Michael and All Angels Church holds distinction for being the town's only category A listed church. This building for the congregation of the Scottish Episcopal Church was designed in 1868 by Sir Robert Rowand Anderson.

=== Education ===
Overall, there are seven schools within Helensburgh.

Among these are three state primary schools: Colgrain, John Logie Baird, and Hermitage Primary. These schools provide pupils for Hermitage Academy, the town's state secondary school. Helensburgh also has a Roman Catholic state primary school, namely St. Joseph's.

Parklands School is also provided by Argyll and Bute Council and is a purpose-built school for pupils with Complex Special Educational Needs. Standing in the School grounds is Ardlui House which provides residential short breaks for up to 2 weeks for the same types of children and young people.

The sole independent school, Lomond School, was founded in 1977 as a result of a merger between St Bride's School (which was for girls) and Larchfield School (which was primary only and for boys). Both primary and secondary education are provided at Lomond School and the school caters for both day pupils and boarders, a large proportion of the latter coming from abroad.

=== Medical services ===
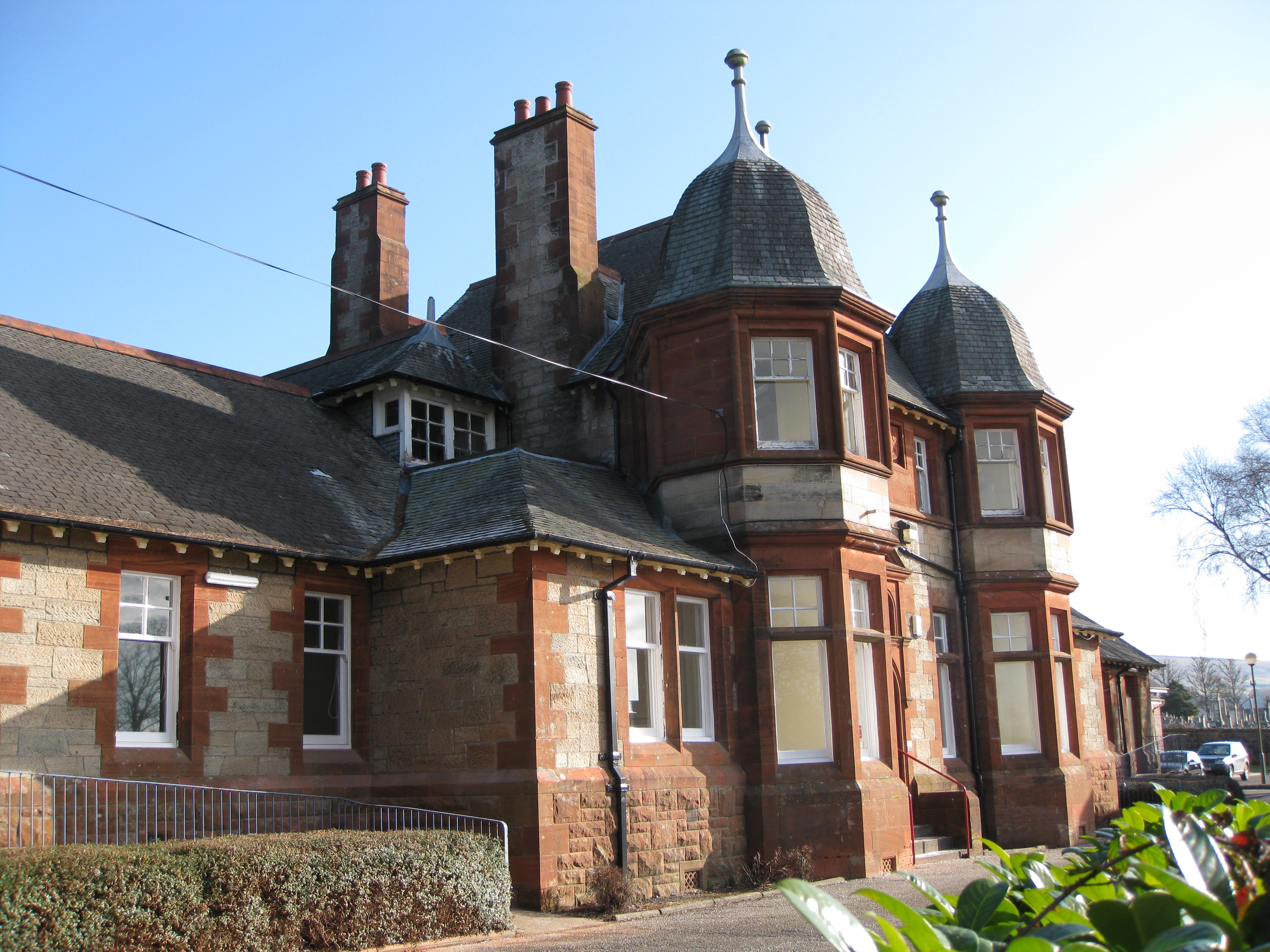
Victoria Infirmary – designed by William Leiper

The town has two medical practices, both located within the same Medical Centre in East King Street. There are also a number of dentists and opticians in the town.

Built as the Victoria Infirmary, the Victoria Integrated Care Centre no longer cares for in-patients and the original building is now little used. However, a variety of clinics do take place in buildings in the grounds.

In 2006, the Helensburgh district opted to come within the NHS Highland area, which is based in Inverness. However, because of the great distance between the Helensburgh area and Inverness, NHS Highland has an arrangement with NHS Greater Glasgow and Clyde which ensures that the latter provides the services needed locally.

=== Sport and leisure ===
Sports are well represented with various football, rugby, cricket, athletics, netball, hockey, curling, bowling, golf, sailing and fishing clubs amongst others active in the town. The seafront has an indoor swimming pool, an esplanade walk, a range of shops, cafes and pubs, and sailing facilities including Helensburgh Sailing Club.

Helensburgh is home to a number of annual events, with the local branch of the Round Table running an annual fireworks display on Guy Fawkes Night and hosting a Real Ale Festival. Helensburgh & Lomond Highland Games take place annually around the start of June.

In regard to the arts, Helensburgh has a digital arts centre, known as The Tower, which functions as a cinema and also hosts live performances in music and theatre.

There are a number of footpaths in and around Helensburgh, and it is also the starting point for some long distance walking and kayaking. In the town itself there are footpaths inside the Duchess Woods, Argyll & Bute's only local nature reserve.

A longer footpath is the Three Lochs Way which connects Loch Lomond with Helensburgh, the Gareloch and Loch Long, and which runs for 34 miles (55 km).

The longest by far of all the walks with a local start is the John Muir Way. This commemorates John Muir, who is celebrated worldwide as the "Father of National Parks" and runs from Helensburgh for 134 miles (215 km) to his birthplace at Dunbar in East Lothian.

The Clyde Sea Lochs Trail is a road route from Dumbarton, through Helensburgh, round the Rosneath Peninsula, and ending at Arrochar, with information panels along the way.

The Argyll Sea Kayak Trail also starts at Helensburgh pier, but finishes at Oban measuring at a distance of around 95 miles (150 km).

== Twin town ==
Helensburgh is twinned with:

- Thouars, Deux-Sèvres, France (since 1983)

== Notable people ==
=== Arts ===
- W. H. Auden, poet
- William Auld, poet and author
- Jack Buchanan, actor, singer, producer and director
- John Butt, orchestral and choral conductor, organist, harpsichordist and musicologist
- Lawrence Chaney, drag queen
- Morven Christie, actress
- Andy Clyde, actor
- Stephen Conroy, artist
- James Copeland, actor
- A. J. Cronin, novelist and physician
- Cecil Day-Lewis, Poet Laureate of the United Kingdom
- Mary Alice Faid (1897–1990), writer, died in Helensburgh
- Tom Gallacher, playwright
- Georgie Glen, actress
- Norah Neilson Gray, artist
- Sir James Guthrie, artist
- Kenny Hyslop, rock drummer in Slik and Simple Minds
- Deborah Kerr, actress, most notably in The King and I
- William Leiper, architect and artist
- Robin Lloyd-Jones, author and educationalist
- Jimmy Logan, impresario and director
- David MacDonald, director, writer and actor
- Helen MacInnes, author
- Lex McLean, music hall comedian
- Fergus McNeill, author and game designer
- Neil Mitchell, musician
- Neil Munro, journalist and literary critic
- Viola Paterson, artist
- George Rickey, kinetic sculptor
- Randolph Schwabe, draughtsman and painter
- Louise Scullion, artist
- Martin Smith, director
- Tom Vaughan, film and television director

=== Medicine ===
- Gavin Arneil, doctor, paediatric nephrologist
- Tina Gray, medical pioneer
- Robert Aim Lennie, doctor
- R. D. Low, pilot and doctor

=== Military ===
- Martin Alabaster, Royal Navy officer
- Phil Ashby, Royal Marines Commando officer
- George Findlay, Victoria Cross recipient
- John Gilmour, World War I pilot
- James Jardine, Medal of Honor recipient
- Sir Ian McGeoch, Royal Navy officer
- Philip Tower, British Army officer
- Alexander Ure, Liberal politician and judge

=== Politics ===
- Marco Biagi, politician
- Andrew Dunlop, Baron Dunlop, politician
- William Jacks, Liberal politician and ironmaster
- Bonar Law, Prime Minister of the United Kingdom
- Samantha Poling, journalist
- Sir William Raeburn, 1st Baronet of Helensburgh, Unionist politician and shipping magnate

=== Religion ===
- Bruce Cameron, Anglican bishop
- Daniel Lamont, Church of Scotland minister
- Alexander Robertson MacEwen, Moderator of the United Free Church of Scotland
- A. E. Robertson, Church of Scotland minister
- Patrick Rodger, Anglican bishop and ecumenist
- Adam Cleghorn Welch, biblical scholar

=== Science, technology, engineering, and mathematics ===
- John Logie Baird, first to demonstrate the working television
- Henry Bell, engineer
- Horatio Scott Carslaw, mathematician
- John Arnold Fleming (1871–1966), chemist, author and historian
- Duncan Gay, scientist and submariner
- James Ballantyne Hannay, chemist
- John Hammersley, mathematician
- Zachary Macaulay, mathematician and abolitionist

=== Sports ===
- John Black, football player
- Bobby Blair, football player
- Bobby Brown, football player and manager
- John Buchanan, Olympic Gold medal-winning sailor
- Peter Canero, football player
- Joe Carson, football player
- Charlotte Cooper, Olympic Gold medal-winning tennis player
- Arthur Downes, Olympic Gold medal-winning sailor
- Malcolm Finlayson, football player
- Jimmy Gunning, football player
- Jack Hill, football player and manager
- Duncan Airlie James, kickboxer
- Billy Jeffrey, football player and manager
- Murdo MacLeod, football player and manager
- Bob McGregor, Olympic Silver medal-winning swimmer
- Michael McIntyre, Olympic Gold medal-winning sailor
- Moses McNeil, co-founder of Rangers F.C.
- Peter McNeil, co-founder of Rangers F.C.
- Charlotte McShane, triathlete
- Tommy Muirhead, football player and manager
- W.C.W. Murdoch, rugby union player
- Gary Orr, golfer
- Derek Parlane, football player
- Luke Patience, Olympic Silver medal-winning sailor
- Gordon Reid, wheelchair tennis player
- Emma Richards, yachtswoman
- Nick Sharkey, football player
- Gordon Sherry, golfer
- Max Simmers, rugby union player
- Walter Smith, football player and manager
- Peter Such, Test cricketer
- Fergus Tiernan, football player

=== Other ===
- James George Frazer, social anthropologist
- Herbert Guthrie-Smith, author and conservationist
- Steve House, senior police officer
- Kim Winser, businesswoman

== See also ==
- List of places in Argyll and Bute
