= List of listed buildings in Helensburgh =

This is a list of listed buildings in the parish of Helensburgh in Argyll and Bute, Scotland.

== List ==
Name	Location	Date listed	Geo-coordinates	Notes	Category	LB number	Image
1 Sutherland Crescent Upper, Rhuarden With Conservatory And Gatepiers			56°00′40″N 4°44′39″W		B	34887	Upload Photo
5, 5A (Bermuda) And 7 William Street			56°00′17″N 4°44′29″W		B	34892	Upload Photo
22, 24, 26, 28 King Street East, Alma Place, 13 Charlotte Street, 38 Grant Street			56°00′14″N 4°43′46″W		C(S)	34804	Upload Photo
25-27 (Odd Nos) King Street West, Strathclyde Regional Council Registry Office			56°00′18″N 4°44′03″W		C(S)	34806	Upload Photo
51-55 (Odd Nos) King Street West And 53 James Street			56°00′20″N 4°44′14″W		C(S)	34807	Upload Photo
72, 74, 76 King Street West			56°00′24″N 4°44′29″W		B	34809	Upload Photo
22 Millig Street			56°00′44″N 4°44′47″W		B	34815	Upload Photo
19, 19A, 19B Montrose Street East And 26 Havelock Street			56°00′21″N 4°43′15″W		C(S)	34816	Upload Photo
Old Luss Road, Helensburgh Cemetery Including Boundary Walls, Lodge, Gatepiers And Gates			56°00′07″N 4°42′46″W		B	34824	Upload Photo
150, 152 Princes Street East, Giffnock House With Lodge And Boundary Wall			56°00′05″N 4°43′17″W		B	34828	Upload Photo
73-79 (Odd Nos) Princes Street West			56°00′17″N 4°44′24″W		C(S)	34831	Upload another image
62-66 (Even Nos) Princes Street West			56°00′17″N 4°44′11″W		B	34835	Upload Photo
150 Princes Street West, Rosebank And 17, 19 Campbell Street			56°00′21″N 4°44′32″W		B	34837	Upload Photo
Rhu Road Lower, Dalmore Lodge With Boundary Walls And_Gatepiers			56°00′38″N 4°45′39″W		B	34850	Upload Photo
3, 5 Rowallan Street, West And East Gables			56°00′45″N 4°44′46″W		B	34853	Upload Photo
33-41 (Odd Nos) Sinclair Street			56°00′13″N 4°44′02″W		C(S)	34855	Upload Photo
Sinclair Street, Dhuhill Lodge With Boundary Wall And Gatepiers			56°00′55″N 4°43′40″W		B	34864	Upload Photo
Sinclair Street, Hermitage Park, War Memorial And Walled Garden With Ornamental Gates			56°00′30″N 4°43′42″W		A	34872	Upload another image
19 Suffolk Street And 1 Sutherland Crescent Lower			56°00′34″N 4°44′38″W		C(S)	34879	Upload Photo
150 Clyde Street East, Rockland And Sundial			55°59′54″N 4°43′05″W		A	34737	Upload Photo
154 Clyde Street East, Rockfort And Folly			55°59′50″N 4°43′02″W		B	34741	Upload Photo
42-45 (Inclusive Nos) Clyde Street West			56°00′13″N 4°44′14″W		B	34748	Upload Photo
95,96 Clyde Street West, Flower Bank			56°00′16″N 4°44′29″W		C(S)	34749	Upload Photo
4 Colquhoun Street Upper, Braeriach With Boundary Wall, Gatepiers And Gates			56°00′56″N 4°43′45″W		B	34759	Upload Photo
19-25 (Inc Nos) Colquhoun Square And 46-60 (Even Nos)_Prince's Street West			56°00′17″N 4°44′11″W		B	34765	Upload Photo
4-9 (Inclusive Nos) Craigendoran Avenue			55°59′52″N 4°42′56″W		C(S)	34768	Upload Photo
Dhuhill Drive West, Greycourt			56°00′59″N 4°43′51″W		A	34771	Upload Photo
1-14 (Inclusive Nos) Glenan Gardens, Argyle Street West			56°00′24″N 4°44′18″W		C(S)	34783	Upload another image
22 Glenfinlas Street Upper, Clunie Hill With Boundary Wall And Gatepiers			56°00′25″N 4°43′16″W		B	34784	Upload Photo
77 James Street, Methilfield			56°00′27″N 4°44′10″W		C(S)	34787	Upload Photo
32-44 (Even Nos) John Street			56°00′19″N 4°44′19″W		C(S)	34794	Upload Photo
King Street East, Baptist Church			56°00′18″N 4°43′56″W		B	34802	Upload Photo
13 Abercromby Street East And 50 Charlotte Street, Hapland With Boundary Walls, Gatepiers And Former Coach House			56°00′38″N 4°43′23″W		B	34697	Upload Photo
18 Abercromby Street West, Summer House			56°00′44″N 4°44′13″W		C(S)	34700	Upload Photo
165 Clyde Street East Corner Adelaide Street			56°00′06″N 4°43′24″W		C(S)	34725	Upload Photo
16 Clyde Street East And 7-9 (Odd Nos) Maitland Street			56°00′09″N 4°43′57″W		C(S)	34728	Upload Photo
104 Clyde Street East			56°00′03″N 4°43′22″W		C(S)	34732	Upload Photo
Clyde Street School With East Lodge, West Lodge (No 38 Clyde Street East) And Boundary Wall, Gates And Railings			56°00′08″N 4°43′49″W		B	45268	Upload another image
2 Sutherland Street Upper, Terpersie (Formerly Thurloe)			56°00′40″N 4°44′40″W		B	34890	Upload Photo
King Street West, West King Street Hall (St Columba's Hall)			56°00′19″N 4°44′01″W		C(S)	34808	Upload Photo
29 Montrose Street East And 4 Adelaide Street Upper			56°00′19″N 4°43′04″W		C(S)	34817	Upload Photo
4 Munro Drive West, Brantwoode With Boundary Wall, Gatepiers, Garage And Garden Gate			56°00′47″N 4°43′46″W		A	34822	Upload another image
1 Princes Street East And 48, 50, 52, 52A Sinclair Street, Municipal Buildings			56°00′15″N 4°43′59″W		B	34825	Upload another image
76 Princes Street East, Former Rifle Hall			56°00′11″N 4°43′46″W		B	34827	Upload Photo
61-65 (Odd Nos) Princes Street West And 22-28 (Even Nos) John Street			56°00′16″N 4°44′20″W		C(S)	34830	Upload another image
8, 10, 12 Princes Street West			56°00′15″N 4°44′02″W		B	34832	Upload Photo
14-28 (Even Nos) Princes Street West			56°00′15″N 4°44′03″W		B	34833	Upload Photo
6 Queen Street, Haywood And Sundial			56°00′39″N 4°43′53″W		C(S)	34840	Upload Photo
Rhu Road Higher, Dalmore, West Lodge With Boundary Wall And Gatepiers			56°00′42″N 4°45′41″W		B	34846	Upload another image
113 Sinclair Street, Moorlands With Conservatory And Gatepiers			56°00′42″N 4°43′48″W		B	34862	Upload Photo
22-34 (Even Nos) Sinclair Street			56°00′12″N 4°44′00″W		C(S)	34867	Upload Photo
Sinclair Street, Hermitage Park, Bust Of Logie Baird			56°00′29″N 4°43′51″W		C(S)	34870	Upload another image See more images
134 Sinclair Street, Albion Lodge			56°00′56″N 4°43′23″W		B	34877	Upload Photo
23 Suffolk Street, The Grange With Boundary Wall And Gatepiers And 39 Millig Street, The Ingle			56°00′39″N 4°44′36″W		C(S)	34880	Upload Photo
6 Sutherland Crescent Lower			56°00′37″N 4°44′46″W		C(S)	34885	Upload Photo
148 Clyde Street East, Cromalt House With Boundary Walls And Gatepiers			55°59′56″N 4°43′07″W		B	34735	Upload Photo
Clyde Street East, Rockland Lodge With Gatepiers, Gates And Boundary Wall			55°59′56″N 4°43′00″W		B	34738	Upload Photo
Colquhoun Square, Bank Of Scotland			56°00′17″N 4°44′05″W		B	34753	Upload another image
Colquhoun Square, Celtic Cross			56°00′16″N 4°44′08″W		B	34764	Upload another image
29 Glasgow Street			56°00′37″N 4°44′31″W		C(S)	34782	Upload Photo
James Street, Former La Scala Cinema			56°00′14″N 4°44′14″W		C(S)	34789	Upload Photo
46-56 (Even Nos) John Street			56°00′20″N 4°44′19″W		C(S)	34795	Upload Photo
John Street Provost Lamp Standards At No 68			56°00′24″N 4°44′17″W		B	34796	Upload Photo
32 Argyle Street West With Gatepiers And Gates			56°00′30″N 4°44′41″W		B	34707	Upload Photo
44 Charlotte Street			56°00′30″N 4°43′26″W		C(S)	34719	Upload Photo
121 Clyde Street East			56°00′07″N 4°43′40″W		B	34721	Upload Photo
Princes Street East, Helensburgh Central Station Including Platforms, Canopies, Screen Walls And Gates			56°00′14″N 4°43′54″W		B	48538	Upload another image
7 Sutherland Crescent Lower			56°00′37″N 4°44′48″W		C(S)	34886	Upload Photo
4 Sutherland Street			56°00′20″N 4°44′49″W		C(S)	34888	Upload Photo
6 Sutherland Street			56°00′20″N 4°44′48″W		C(S)	34889	Upload Photo
17 William Street			56°00′19″N 4°44′27″W		C(S)	34893	Upload Photo
25 And 27 William Street			56°00′20″N 4°44′26″W		B	34894	Upload Photo
William Street, St Michael And All Angels' Episcopal Church Rectory			56°00′17″N 4°44′25″W		C(S)	34897	Upload another image
108 King Street West, Carisbrooke With Gatepiers, Gates And Conservatory			56°00′29″N 4°44′44″W		B	34810	Upload Photo
20 Millig Street And 33 Queen Street, Woodend With Conservatory, Boundary And Garden Walls, Gatepiers, Gates, Lamp Standard And Garage			56°00′44″N 4°44′39″W		B	34814	Upload Photo
146 Sinclair Street, Drum-Millig			56°00′59″N 4°43′21″W		B	34878	Upload Photo
17, 18 And 19 Clyde Street West			56°00′12″N 4°44′07″W		C(S)	34745	Upload Photo
36 Clyde Street West			56°00′13″N 4°44′12″W		B	34747	Upload Photo
41 Colquhoun Street, Galloway Cottage			56°00′34″N 4°44′01″W		B	34755	Upload Photo
John Street, Provost Lamp Standards At No 51, Helensburgh Library			56°00′27″N 4°44′16″W		B	34793	Upload Photo
70 John Street, Corner Argyle Street			56°00′26″N 4°44′14″W		B	34797	Upload Photo
19 Abercromby Street East			56°00′37″N 4°43′05″W		B	34699	Upload Photo
2 Adelaide Street With Gatepiers And Railings			56°00′04″N 4°43′24″W		B	34701	Upload Photo
Ardencaple Castle			56°00′33″N 4°45′25″W		B	34703	Upload Photo
38 Argyle Street West, Garthland			56°00′32″N 4°44′47″W		C(S)	34709	Upload Photo
29 And 31 Campbell Street			56°00′26″N 4°44′31″W		C(S)	34711	Upload Photo
38 And 40 Campbell Street, Burnside			56°00′26″N 4°44′27″W		B	34712	Upload Photo
50 Campbell Street, Westburn			56°00′36″N 4°44′20″W		B	34713	Upload another image
43 Charlotte Street			56°00′35″N 4°43′28″W		B	34717	Upload Photo
46 Charlotte Street, Arden And 16 Abercromby Street East, Upper Arden			56°00′34″N 4°43′22″W		B	34720	Upload Photo
Clyde Street East, East Bay Esplanade, Public Shelters And Lavatories			56°00′06″N 4°43′29″W		C(S)	34731	Upload Photo
William Street, St Michael And All Angels' Episcopal Church And Church Hall			56°00′18″N 4°44′25″W		A	34896	Upload another image
30-34 (Even Nos) Princes Street West			56°00′15″N 4°44′04″W		C(S)	34834	Upload Photo
25 Queen Street With Boundary Wall			56°00′42″N 4°44′27″W		C(S)	34839	Upload Photo
10 Queen Street, Westward			56°00′40″N 4°43′59″W		C(S)	34841	Upload Photo
32 Queen Street, Deanston With Gatepiers			56°00′44″N 4°44′26″W		C(S)	34844	Upload Photo
101 Sinclair Street, Millfield With Gatepiers			56°00′28″N 4°43′56″W		B	34858	Upload Photo
109 Sinclair Street, Cawdor Lodge And 111 Sinclair Street, Tower House			56°00′36″N 4°43′51″W		B	34861	Upload Photo
127 Sinclair Street, Dhuhill And Gatepiers			56°00′57″N 4°43′37″W		B	34863	Upload Photo
135 Sinclair Street, Ardluss With Boundary Wall, Gatepiers And Gates			56°00′59″N 4°43′31″W		B	34865	Upload Photo
25 Suffolk Street, Auchenteil With Boundary Walls And Gatepiers			56°00′43″N 4°44′35″W		B	34881	Upload Photo
122 Clyde Street West And 2 Sutherland Street			56°00′19″N 4°44′49″W		C(S)	34752	Upload another image
Douglas Drive, Tordarroch With Boundary Wall, Gatepiers And Gates			56°00′53″N 4°43′42″W		B	34773	Upload Photo
23 Glasgow Street			56°00′30″N 4°44′34″W		C(S)	34780	Upload Photo
Kennedy Drive, Cuilvona			56°01′01″N 4°43′37″W		B	34800	Upload another image
4 Albert Street, Moorgate With Boundary Walls			56°00′29″N 4°43′18″W		B	34702	Upload Photo
10 Argyle Street West And 52, 54 Colquhoun Street, Rosemount With Gatepiers, Gates, Boundary Wall And_Coach-House			56°00′24″N 4°44′02″W		C(S)	34706	Upload Photo
121 Argyle Street West, The Lodge			56°00′28″N 4°44′41″W		B	34710	Upload Photo
127 Clyde Street East			56°00′07″N 4°43′33″W		C(S)	34722	Upload Photo
149-151 (Odd Nos) Clyde Street East And 1-3 (Odd Nos) Glenfinlas Street			56°00′07″N 4°43′28″W		C(S)	34723	Upload Photo
153 Clyde Street East And 2 Glenfinlas Street			56°00′06″N 4°43′26″W		C(S)	34724	Upload Photo
108 And 110 Clyde Street East, Rimsdale And Traigh-Na-Mara With Stables, Boundary Walls And Gate			56°00′03″N 4°43′21″W		C(S)	34733	Upload Photo
37, 39 William Street And 71 King Street West			56°00′22″N 4°44′26″W		B	34895	Upload Photo
74, 76, 78 King Street East			56°00′11″N 4°43′26″W		C(S)	34805	Upload Photo
14 Millig Street And 43, 45 Campbell Street With Boundary Wall, Gatepiers And Gates			56°00′40″N 4°44′23″W		B	34812	Upload Photo
18 Millig Street, Wester Millig, Boundary Walls, Gatepiers And Gates			56°00′41″N 4°44′29″W		B	34813	Upload Photo
57 Princes East And 17-21 (Odd Nos) Lomond Street			56°00′11″N 4°43′38″W		C(S)	34826	Upload Photo
Princes Street West, Congregational Church			56°00′16″N 4°44′12″W		B	34829	Upload another image
186 And 188 Princes Street West, Leewood With Boundary Wall And Gatepiers			56°00′24″N 4°44′53″W		B	34838	Upload Photo
24 Queen Street With Boundary Wall, Gatepiers And Coach House			56°00′42″N 4°44′14″W		C(S)	34843	Upload Photo
Red Gauntlet Road, Drumfork House			56°00′01″N 4°42′36″W		B	34845	Upload Photo
Rhu Road Lower, Cairndhu House			56°00′23″N 4°45′12″W		A	34847	Upload another image
Rhu Road Lower, Dalmore House			56°00′41″N 4°45′34″W		A	34849	Upload another image
1 Rowallan Street			56°00′43″N 4°44′45″W		B	34852	Upload Photo
93 Sinclair Street			56°00′21″N 4°43′58″W		C(S)	34857	Upload Photo
107 Sinclair Street, Thornton Lodge			56°00′32″N 4°43′53″W		B	34860	Upload Photo
Sinclair Street, Old Millig Toll House			56°00′59″N 4°43′27″W		B	34866	Upload Photo
38-40 Sinclair Street, Former Helensburgh And Gareloch Conservative Club			56°00′13″N 4°43′59″W		A	34868	Upload another image
Sinclair Street, Hermitage Park, Flywheel And Anvil			56°00′28″N 4°43′50″W		C(S)	34871	Upload another image
132 Sinclair Street, Ballytrim And Gatepiers			56°00′55″N 4°43′29″W		C(S)	34876	Upload Photo
152 Clyde Street East, Tigh-Na-Mara			55°59′52″N 4°43′03″W		B	34739	Upload Photo
Clyde Street East, Rockfort Lodge, Boundary Walls And Gatepiers			55°59′55″N 4°42′58″W		C(S)	34742	Upload Photo
Imperial Hotel, 12 Clyde Street West			56°00′11″N 4°44′17″W		C(S)	34744	Upload another image
119 Clyde Street West With Boundary Wall And Gatepiers			56°00′19″N 4°44′46″W		B	34751	Upload another image
49 Colquhoun Street, Pynhannot House			56°00′44″N 4°43′56″W		B	34756	Upload Photo
2 Colquhoun Street Upper, Whincroft With Boundary Wall And Gatepiers			56°00′50″N 4°43′48″W		B	34758	Upload Photo
8 Colquhoun Street Upper, The Hill House With Outbuildings, Boundary Walls And Gates			56°01′03″N 4°43′42″W		A	34761	Upload another image
Colquhoun Square, The West Kirk (Church Of Scotland)			56°00′18″N 4°44′09″W		B	34766	Upload another image
Dhuhill Drive West, Letham Hill			56°00′59″N 4°43′54″W		B	34772	Upload Photo
Douglas Drive, Red Towers With Boundary Wall, Gatepiers, Gates And Wellhead			56°00′53″N 4°43′45″W		A	34774	Upload another image
46 And 48 George Street, Towerville With Boundary Wall, Gatepiers And Lodge			56°00′18″N 4°43′23″W		B	34777	Upload Photo
11 Glasgow Street And 115 Princes Street West, Wellcroft			56°00′20″N 4°44′39″W		B	34779	Upload Photo
25 Glasgow Street			56°00′31″N 4°44′33″W		B	34781	Upload Photo
27 John Street			56°00′19″N 4°44′21″W		C(S)	34792	Upload another image
80 John Street With Boundary Wall And Gatepiers			56°00′38″N 4°44′11″W		B	34799	Upload Photo
9 East Abercromby Street, Auchenault And 9 East Rossdhu Drive, Dorrator Including Gatepiers And Boundary Walls			56°00′39″N 4°43′30″W		B	34695	Upload Photo
33 Charlotte Street, The Crossways With Gatepiers			56°00′29″N 4°43′33″W		B	34715	Upload Photo
Victoria Road, The Lindens			56°00′33″N 4°43′39″W		B	34891	Upload Photo
56 William Street, Upper Ericstane With Screen And Boundary Wall And 7 A Montrose Street West, Lower Ericstane			56°00′29″N 4°44′20″W		C(S)	34898	Upload Photo
31 Montrose Street East			56°00′18″N 4°43′02″W		B	34819	Upload Photo
76, 78 Princes Street West And 18, 20 James Street			56°00′17″N 4°44′13″W		B	34836	Upload Photo
Sinclair Street, Church Of St Columba (Church Of Scotland)			56°00′19″N 4°43′59″W		B	34856	Upload Photo
103 Sinclair Street, Rowanmore With Boundary Wall And Piers			56°00′29″N 4°43′54″W		C(S)	34859	Upload Photo
Sinclair Street, Victoria Halls			56°00′24″N 4°43′54″W		B	34869	Upload another image
106 Sinclair Street			56°00′37″N 4°43′48″W		C(S)	34873	Upload Photo
118 Sinclair Street, Rokneys With Boundary Wall, Gatepiers And Conservatory			56°00′46″N 4°43′42″W		B	34875	Upload Photo
34 And 36 Suffolk Street, Kintillo House With Garage, Boundary Wall, Gatepiers			56°00′38″N 4°44′33″W		B	34884	Upload Photo
Clyde Street East, Queen's Court (Formerly Queen's Hotel) And Provost's Lamps			56°00′01″N 4°43′18″W		C(S)	34734	Upload another image
Clyde Street East, Tarandoun Cottage With Boundary Wall, Gatepiers And Gates			55°59′56″N 4°43′00″W		C(S)	34740	Upload Photo
24 Clyde Street West			56°00′12″N 4°44′08″W		B	34746	Upload Photo
62 Colquhoun Street, Kildare Lodge With Boundary Wall And Gatepiers			56°00′30″N 4°43′59″W		C(S)	34757	Upload Photo
3 Craigendoran Avenue			55°59′53″N 4°42′55″W		C(S)	34767	Upload Photo
4 Glasgow Street, Craigbank			56°00′18″N 4°44′38″W		C(S)	34778	Upload Photo
23 Henry Bell Street, Redcote			56°00′16″N 4°42′58″W		B	34786	Upload Photo
17 And 19 (Odd Nos) John Street			56°00′17″N 4°44′22″W		C(S)	34791	Upload another image
76 John Street, Glen Kin With Boundary Wall And Gatepiers			56°00′32″N 4°44′12″W		B	34798	Upload Photo
45 Charlotte Street			56°00′35″N 4°43′26″W		B	34718	Upload Photo
217 Clyde Street East, Willowbank And Boundary Walls			56°00′00″N 4°43′06″W		C(S)	34726	Upload Photo
4 Clyde Street East, Tourist Information Centre (Bell Tower Of Former Parish Church			56°00′10″N 4°44′02″W		C(S)	34727	Upload another image
60 Clyde Street East			56°00′07″N 4°43′42″W		C(S)	34729	Upload Photo
20 Queen Street, Ardvuela And Gatepiers			56°00′43″N 4°44′10″W		B	34842	Upload Photo
Rhu Road Lower, Cairndhu Lodge With Boundary Wall And Gatepiers			56°00′20″N 4°45′09″W		B	34848	Upload Photo
Rossdhu Drive West, Longcroft			56°00′47″N 4°44′10″W		A	34851	Upload Photo
22A Suffolk Street			56°00′29″N 4°44′38″W		C(S)	34882	Upload Photo
Clyde Street East, Cromalt Coach House And Stables			55°59′55″N 4°43′06″W		B	34736	Upload Photo
105, 106 Clyde Street West			56°00′17″N 4°44′35″W		C(S)	34750	Upload Photo
19 Havelock Street			56°00′25″N 4°43′15″W		C(S)	34785	Upload Photo
15 King's Crescent (Formerly Towerville Lodge)			56°00′16″N 4°43′18″W		C(S)	34801	Upload Photo
47 Charlotte Street, Greenpark			56°00′39″N 4°43′27″W		B	34696	Upload Photo
9 Argyle Street East			56°00′21″N 4°43′50″W		C(S)	34704	Upload Photo
5 Argyle Street West			56°00′21″N 4°43′59″W		C(S)	34705	Upload Photo
36 Argyle Street West, Westways			56°00′31″N 4°44′45″W		C(S)	34708	Upload Photo
Charlotte Street, Park Church (Church Of Scotland) And Church Hall With Boundary Wall And Gatepiers			56°00′17″N 4°43′42″W		B	34714	Upload another image
41 Charlotte Street			56°00′34″N 4°43′26″W		B	34716	Upload Photo
82 And 84 Clyde Street East			56°00′07″N 4°43′40″W		C(S)	34730	Upload Photo
Lomond Street, St Joseph's Rc Church With Gatepiers And Gates			56°00′15″N 4°43′37″W		B	34811	Upload another image
1 Montrose Street West, Dalfruin With Boundary Wall And Gatepiers			56°00′27″N 4°44′11″W		B	34820	Upload Photo
6 Munro Drive East, Easterhill			56°00′45″N 4°43′35″W		B	34821	Upload Photo
6 Munro Drive West, Strathmoyne With Boundary Wall, Gatepiers And Gates			56°00′47″N 4°43′49″W		B	34823	Upload Photo
116 Sinclair Street, Former West Highland Railway, Helensburgh Upper, Station Master's House			56°00′44″N 4°43′43″W		C(S)	34874	Upload Photo
26 Suffolk Street			56°00′32″N 4°44′37″W		B	34883	Upload Photo
Clyde Street West, The Esplanade, Monument To Henry Bell			56°00′12″N 4°44′16″W		B	34743	Upload another image See more images
18 Colquhoun Street, Post Office			56°00′15″N 4°44′10″W		B	34754	Upload another image
6 Colquhoun Street Upper, Lynton With Boundary Wall, Gatepiers And Gates			56°00′58″N 4°43′42″W		B	34760	Upload another image
15 Colquhoun Street Upper, The White House With Garage And Boundary Wall			56°00′54″N 4°43′50″W		A	34762	Upload another image
17 Upper Colquhoun Street, Drumadoon (Formerly Morar House) With Gatepiers And Boundary Wall And Garden Pavilion			56°01′03″N 4°43′46″W		A	34763	Upload another image
Dhuhill House And Conservatory, Dhuhill Drive West			56°00′58″N 4°43′39″W		B	34769	Upload Photo
Dhuhill Drive West, Brincliffe With Boundary Wall And Gatepiers			56°00′59″N 4°43′49″W		B	34770	Upload Photo
3 Easterhill Road			56°00′40″N 4°43′12″W		B	34775	Upload Photo
4 Easterhill Road, Dunluce			56°00′41″N 4°43′12″W		B	34776	Upload Photo
89 James Street And 13 Queen Street, Lomond School			56°00′37″N 4°44′06″W		B	34788	Upload another image
10 And 12 James Street, Clydesdale Bank			56°00′15″N 4°44′14″W		B	34790	Upload another image
93 King Street East, Victoria Infirmary			56°00′10″N 4°42′55″W		B	34803	Upload another image
17 Abercromby Street East			56°00′37″N 4°43′08″W		B	34698	Upload Photo

== Key ==
The scheme for classifying buildings in Scotland is:

- Category A: "buildings of national or international importance, either architectural or historic; or fine, little-altered examples of some particular period, style or building type."
- Category B: "buildings of regional or more than local importance; or major examples of some particular period, style or building type, which may have been altered."
- Category C: "buildings of local importance; lesser examples of any period, style, or building type, as originally constructed or moderately altered; and simple traditional buildings which group well with other listed buildings."

In March 2016 there were 47,288 listed buildings in Scotland. Of these, 8% were Category A, and 50% were Category B, with the remaining 42% being Category C.

== See also ==
- List of listed buildings in Argyll and Bute
