= Westkerke =

Westkerke may refer to:

- Westkerke, Netherlands
- Westkerke, Belgium in the municipality of Oudenburg

== See also ==
- Helensburgh Parish Church, church in Helensburgh, Scotland, formerly called the West Kirk.
