= Charles Frederick Partington =

British science lecturer and writer

Charles Frederick Partington (died 1857?) was a British science lecturer and writer.

== Life ==
Partington was associated with the London Institution. He lectured successfully also in the North of England, and adopted the style "Professor". While he at times claimed a closer relationship with the London Institution, professionally he was paid there only as an assistant librarian, by William Maltby. His presumption of a position at the Institute caused friction in the end, and he had to drop any such claim. Partington lectured also at the other institutes in London (the Russell Institution, Surrey Institution, and London Mechanics Institute). He lectured to the short-lived London Chemical Society in 1824.

== Works ==
Partington published the following:

- An Historical and Descriptive Account of the Steam Engine, comprising a General View of the Various Modes of employing Elastic Vapour as a Prime Mover in Mechanics, 1822; 3rd. edit. 1826.
- A Brief Account of the Royal Gardens, Vauxhall, 1822.
- The Printers' Complete Guide, containing a Sketch of the History and Progress of Printing, 1825.
- The Shipbuilder's Complete Guide, 1825.
- The Clock and Watchmaker's Complete Guide, 1825.
- The Engraver's Complete Guide, 1825.
- A Course of Lectures on the Steam Engine, with a work on steam navigation published by Jonathan Hulls, 1826.
- A Manual of Natural and Experimental Philosophy, 1828, 2 vols.
- Introduction to the Science of Botany, illustrated by a series of highly finished delineations of the plants, coloured to represent Nature, 1835.
- An Account of Steam Engines, 1835.
- National History and Views of London and its Environs, from original drawings by eminent artists, 2 vols.; 2nd edit. 1835–7, 2 vols. (1833–4). This work came out in eighteen parts. George Shepherd made 400 drawings for the illustrations, according to Lucy Peltz in the Oxford Dictionary of National Biography; Bernard Adams, however, attributes the majority to Thomas Hosmer Shepherd, his brother, working with H. West. The engraver was J. Shury.
- The Builder's Complete Guide, 1852.
- Introductory Account of Messrs. Muir and Company's Machinery for the Manufacture of Rifle Sights, 1857.

== Edited works ==
Partington edited The British Cyclopædia of Arts and Sciences, Literature, History, Geography, Law and Politics, Natural History and Biography, from 1835; the tenth and last volume appeared in 1837. As a part publication, it appeared from May 1834 in monthly parts at a shilling. The divisions were:

1. Arts and Sciences;
2. Natural History;
3. Biography; and
4. Literature, History and Geography.

Partington wrote: division 1 parts i.–xxv., division 2 parts i.–xxiv., division 3 parts i.–xi. Much of the natural history division was written by Robert Mudie.

Other edited works were:

- Lectures on Select Subjects in Mechanics and Hydrostatics, by J. Ferguson, F.R.S., adapted to the present state of science (1825)
- The Century of Inventions, by the Marquis of Worcester, with Notes and a Biographical Memoir (1825)
- The Mechanics' Gallery of Science and Art, 1825, vol. i.; no more printed.

== Periodicals ==
Partington edited The Scientific Gazette, or Library of Mechanical Philosophy, Chemistry, and Discovery, which ran from July 1825 to 4 February 1826. With the civil engineer William Newton, he edited and partly wrote the second series of The London Journal of Arts and Sciences, containing descriptions of every new patent; also original communications on science and philosophy; this periodical went to nine volumes, 1834–42.

== Notes ==
Attribution

This article incorporates text from a publication now in the public domain: Lee, Sidney, ed. (1895). "Partington, Charles Frederick". Dictionary of National Biography. Vol. 43. London: Smith, Elder & Co.
