= Stickleback (disambiguation) =

Stickleback is a type of fish.

Stickleback can also refer to:

- Stickleback (comics), series by Ian Edginton and D'Israeli
- USS Stickleback (SS-415), United States Navy submarine
- Stickleback class submarine, class of British midget submarines
