= Municipal Buildings, Helensburgh =

Municipal building in Helensburgh, Scotland

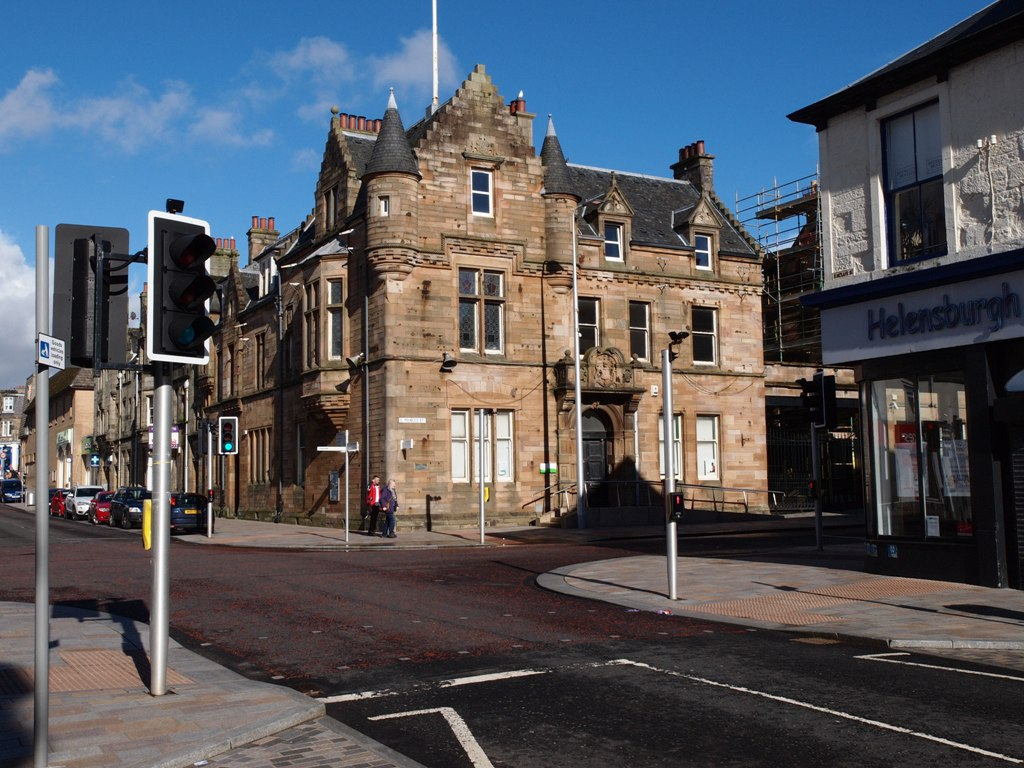
- Municipal Buildings, Helensburgh

- Shown in Argyll and Bute
- 56.0041°N 4.7330°W
- Location: Princes Street East, Helensburgh

History
- Built: 1879

Site notes
- Architect: John Honeyman
- Architectural style: Scottish baronial style

Listed Building – Category B
- Official name: 1 Princes Street East And 48, 50, 52, 52A Sinclair Street, Municipal Buildings
- Designated: 30 June 1993
- Reference no.: LB34825

The Municipal Buildings are based on the north side of Princes Street East in Helensburgh, Scotland. The structure, which served as the meeting place of Helensburgh Burgh Council, is a Category B listed building.

== History ==
Following significant population growth, largely associated with the pioneering work of Henry Bell to develop local tourism and shipbuilding initiatives, the area became a police burgh in 1846. The new burgh commissioners acquired an old theatre on the corner of Princes Street East and Sinclair Street for use as a burgh office in 1850. With further growth driven by the arrival of the Glasgow, Dumbarton and Helensburgh Railway in 1858, the burgh commissioners decided to demolish the old theatre and to erect a purpose-built structure on the site.

The foundation stone for the new building was laid by the former member of parliament, Alexander Smollett, on 15 August 1878. It was designed by John Honeyman in the Scottish baronial style, built in ashlar stone at a cost of £4,454 and was officially opened on 13 July 1879. The design involved an asymmetrical main frontage with four bays facing onto Princes Street East; the left hand bay, which was slightly projected forward and was gabled, was fenestrated with a three-light window on the ground floor, a cross-window on the first floor and a single casement window on the second floor and was flanked by bartizans. The second bay featured a doorway with a fanlight and a round headed surround decorated with a keystone bearing a bust of Henry Bell; the doorway was flanked by pilasters and brackets supporting an entablature bearing a coat of arms. The other bays were fenestrated with sash windows on the ground floor and the first floor and, at roof level, there were two dormer windows. Internally, the principal room was the council chamber.

The complex was extended to the north by twelve extra bays, to a design by Alexander Nisbet Paterson, to accommodate a fire station, a courthouse and a police station in 1906. Unusual features introduced by the architect included carvings of handcuffs above the entrance to the police station and, because he liked cats, a carving of a cat at roof level high above the entrance to the courthouse. A plaque to commemorate the life of the locally-born inventor, John Logie Baird, was unveiled on the front wall of the building by the provost, William Lever, in May 1952.

Following an extensive programme of restoration works costing £1 million, Queen Elizabeth II, accompanied by the Duke of Edinburgh, re-opened the building and then met with the burgh officials in June 1965. The police service moved to a new police station on East King Street in the late-1960s and the fire service moved to a new fire station on South King Street in the mid-1970s.

The building continued to serve as the headquarters of the burgh council for much of the 20th century but ceased to be the local seat of government when the enlarged Dumbarton District Council was formed in 1975. It was subsequently used for the delivery of local services by Dumbarton District Council, but after Argyll and Bute Council became the unitary authority for the area in 1996, the new council found structural problems in the building and it was left empty and deteriorating. The council had no further use for the building anyway after it co-located its local services at a new civic centre in Clyde Street in June 2015. In 2019, the building was sold to a developer who commenced works to convert it into a restaurant. In 2023 Peckham's opened a bar and restaurant in the building.

== See also ==
- List of listed buildings in Helensburgh
