= Henry Bell (engineer) =

Scottish engineer (1767 - 1830)

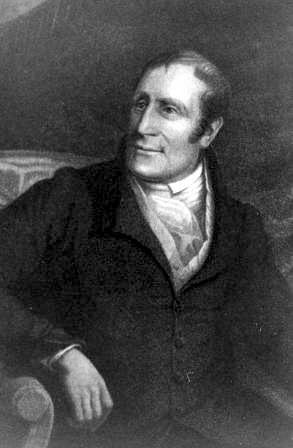
- Born: 7 April 1767; Torphichen, Scotland
- Died: 14 November 1830 (aged 63); Helensburgh, Scotland
- Known for: Paddlesteamer Comet

Henry Bell (7 April 1767 – 14 November 1830) was a Scottish engineer who helped to pioneer the development of the steamship. He is mostly widely known for introducing the first successful passenger steamboat service in Europe in 1812.

== Early career ==
Bell was born at Torphichen, Bathgate, West Lothian in 1767. He was the fifth son of Patrick Bell and Margaret Easton, themselves members of a family well known at the time as millwrights, builders and engineers. He grew up at the local mill in Torphichen, where developed a working knowledge of water power. Work carried out by members of the Bell family included the design and construction of harbours, bridges, etc., in Scotland and throughout the United Kingdom. Henry Bell was educated at the local parish school and was apprenticed to a stonemason between 1780 and 1783. Three years later, he was briefly apprenticed to his uncle, a millwright. In 1786, he went to work Borrowstounness and learned ship modelling. In 1787, he pursued his interest in ship mechanics in Bellshill with the engineer Mr James Inglis, which was then followed by several years working in London under the engineer John Rennie the Elder.

He returned to Scotland around 1790, and moved to Glasgow, where he worked as a house-carpenter. His ambition was to follow in the footsteps of his ancestors and become a civil engineer, and to this end, he joined the Glasgow corporation of wrights on 20 October 1797. He was unsuccessful, apparently due to either lack of money, or lack of application or skill on his part. According to one contemporary:

"Bell had many of the features of the enthusiastic projector; never calculated means to ends, or looked much farther than the first stages or movements of any scheme. His mind was a chaos of extraordinary projects, the most of which, from his want of accurate scientific calculation, he never could carry into practice. Owing to an imperfection in even his mechanical skill, he scarcely ever made one part of a model suit the rest, so that many designs, after a great deal of pains and expense, were successively abandoned. He was, in short, the hero of a thousand blunders and one success."

== Interest in steam power for shipping ==
The idea of propelling vessels by means of steam early took possession of his mind. "In 1800 (he writes) I applied to Lord Melville, on purpose to show his lordship and the other members of the Admiralty, the practicability and great utility of applying steam to the propelling of vessels against winds and tides, and every obstruction on rivers and seas, where there was depth of water." Disappointed in this application, he repeated the attempt in 1803, with the same result, notwithstanding the emphatic declaration of the celebrated Lord Nelson, who, addressing their lord-ships on the occasion, said, "My Lords, if you do not adopt Mr Bell's scheme, other nations will, and in the end vex every vein of this empire. It will succeed (he added), and you should encourage Mr Bell." Having obtained no support in this country, Bell forwarded copies of the prospectus of his scheme to the different nations of Europe, and to the United States of America. "The Americans," he writes, "were the first who put my plan into practice, and were quickly followed by other nations." The various attempts which preceded that of Bell are briefly noticed in the "Fifth Report of the Select committee of the House of Commons on Steam-Boats, June, 1822, Sir Henry Parnell, chairman." Mentioning the following as experimenters, namely, Mr Jonathan Hulls, in 1736; the Duke of Bridgewater, on the Manchester and Runcorn canal; Mr Miller of Dalswinton; the Marquis de Jouffroy (a French nobleman), in 1781; Lord Stanhope, in 1795; and Mr Symington and Mr Taylor, on the Forth and Clyde Canal, in 1801–2; the Report proceeds—"These ingenious men made valuable experiments, and tested well the mighty power of steam. Still no practical uses resulted from any of these attempts. It was not till the year 1807 when the Americans began to use steamboats on their rivers, that their safety and utility were first proved. But the merit of constructing these boats is due to natives of Great Britain. Mr Henry Bell of Glasgow gave the first model of them to the late Mr Fulton of America and corresponded regularly with Fulton on the subject. Mr Bell continued to turn his talents to the improving of steam apparatus, and its application to various manufactures about Glasgow; and in 1811, constructed the Comet steam-boat."

== Paddlesteamer Comet ==
In 1808, Bell moved to the modern town of Helensburgh, on the north shore of the Firth of Clyde, where his wife undertook the superintendence of the public baths, and at the same time kept the principal inn, whilst he continued to prosecute his favourite scheme, without much regard to the ordinary affairs of the world. In 1809 Henry Bell was elected as the first Provost of Helensburgh.

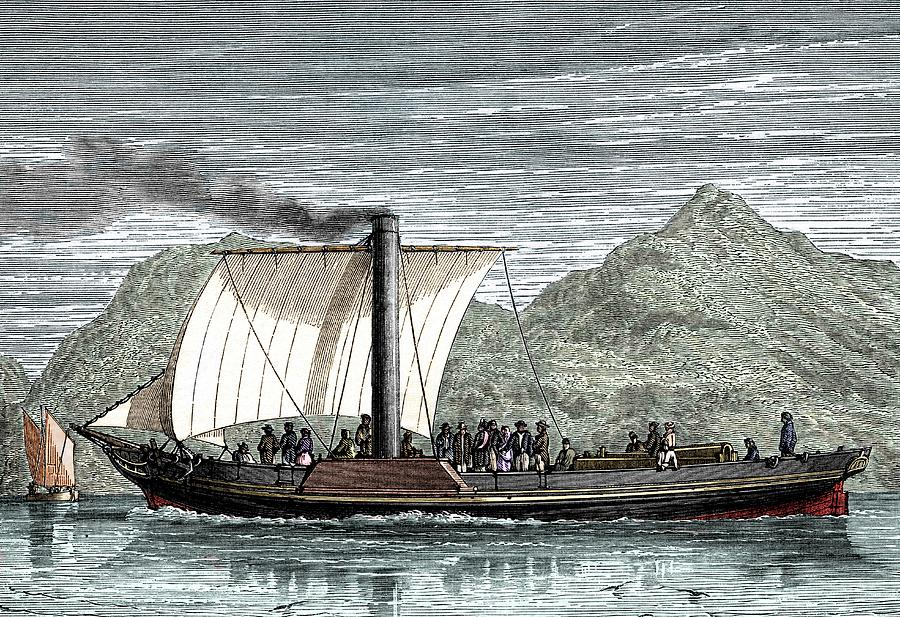
PS Comet sailing on passenger service on the River Clyde 1812

In 1812, he and John Robertson built the steam-boat the PS Comet, of 30 tons burthen, with an engine of three horsepower. The Comet, named after a great comet which had been visible for several months in 1811–12, was built by Messrs John Wood and Co., at Port Glasgow 3 miles east of Greenock on the south bank of the River Clyde as it widens into the Firth of Clyde. The Comet made a delivery voyage from Port Glasgow 21 miles upriver to the Broomielaw, Glasgow, then sailed from Glasgow the 24 miles down to Greenock, making five miles an hour against a head-wind. (some sources give a date of 18 January 1812 for a trial trip, McCrorie gives 6 August 1812 for the delivery, with the historic trip a day or so later.) In August, Bell advertised a passenger service on the Comet between Glasgow, Greenock and Helensburgh three times a week, returning on alternate days, "to ply upon the River Clyde from Glasgow, to sail by the power of air, wind, and steam."

Bell briefly tried a service on the Firth of Forth. Then he had the Comet lengthened and re-engined and from September 1819 ran a service to Oban and Fort William (via the Crinan Canal) a trip which took four days, but on 13 December 1820 the Comet was shipwrecked in strong currents at Craignish Point, near Oban. Bell built another vessel, Comet II, but, on 21 October 1825, she collided with the steamer Ayr off Kempock Point, Gourock. Comet II sank very quickly, killing 62 of the 80 passengers on board. After the loss of his second ship, Bell abandoned his work on steam navigation.

== Later life ==
Bell lived to see his invention universally adopted. The Clyde, which first enjoyed the advantages of steam navigation, became the principal seat of this description of ship-building. Bell reaped no personal advantage from the widespread adoption of steam-powered ships and spent many of his later years in abject poverty.

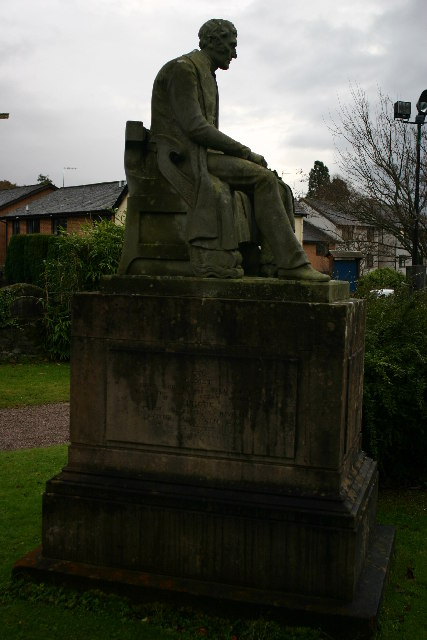
Grave of Henry Bell in Rhu churchyard

Touched by his condition, the late Dr Cleland, and a number of other benevolent individuals, commenced a subscription on his behalf, by which a considerable sum was raised. The trustees on the river Clyde granted him an annuity of £100, which was continued to his widow.

== Death ==
Bell died at Helensburgh in 1830, aged 62. He was interred in the Rhu churchyard. An obelisk to his memory was erected on the rock of Dunglass, a promontory on the Clyde, about 2 1/2 miles above Dumbarton. There is a memorial stone and obelisk on the seafront at Helensburgh.

== Sources ==
- Clyde Pleasure Steamers Ian McCrorie, Orr, Pollock & Co. Ltd., Greenock, ISBN 1-869850-00-9
- Osborne, Brian (1995). The ingenious Mr Bell : a life of Henry Bell (1767-1830), pioneer of steam navigation. Glendaruel: Argyll. ISBN 978-1-902831-28-2. OCLC 48362448.
- Chisholm, Hugh, ed. (1911). "Bell, Henry" . Encyclopædia Britannica. Vol. 3 (11th ed.). Cambridge University Press.
- Wood, Henry Trueman Wright (1885). "Bell, Henry (1767-1830)" . In Stephen, Leslie (ed.). Dictionary of National Biography. Vol. 4. London: Smith, Elder & Co.
- Moss, Michael S. "Bell, Henry (1767–1830)". Oxford Dictionary of National Biography (online ed.). Oxford University Press. doi:10.1093/ref:odnb/2003. (Subscription, Wikipedia Library access or UK public library membership required.)
- Ransom, P.J.G (2012). Bell's Comet. How a Paddle Steamer Changed the Course of History. Amberley Publishing. ISBN 978-1445620107.
