= Stickleback-class submarine =

Military vessel

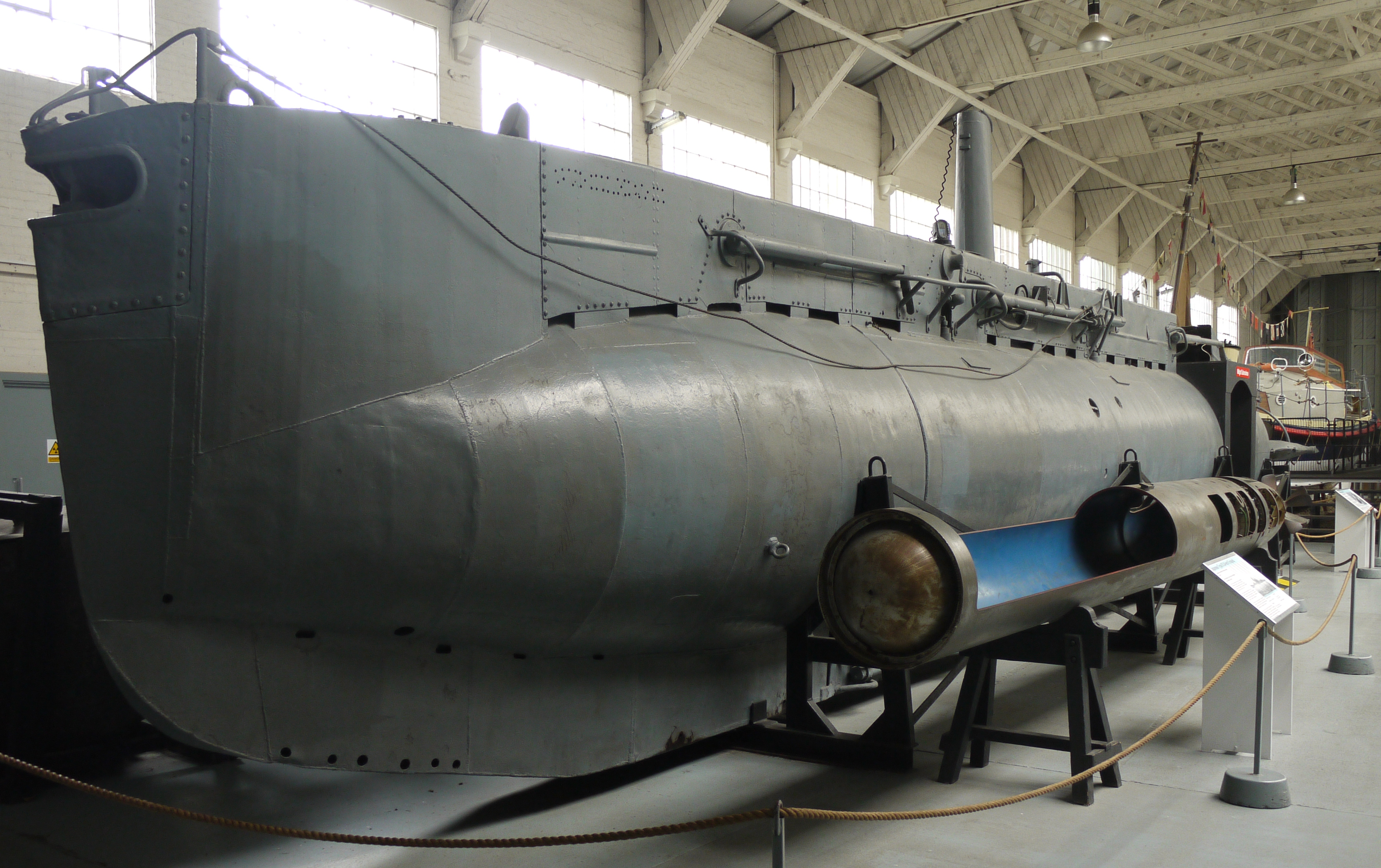
- X51 Stickleback at Imperial War Museum Duxford

History

United Kingdom
- Name: Stickleback class

General characteristics
- Type: Midget submarine
- Displacement: 35.2 tons surfaced; 39.27 tons submerged
- Length: 50 ft 8 in (15.44 m) (pp); 53 ft 10 in (16.41 m) (oa)
- Beam: 6 ft (1.8 m)
- Draught: 7 ft 6 in (2.29 m)
- Propulsion: 1 shaft diesel electric, 1 Perkins P6 6 cyl diesel, 1 electric motor, 50 bhp/44 shp
- Speed: 6.5 knots (12.0 km/h; 7.5 mph) surfaced; 6 knots (11 km/h; 6.9 mph) submerged
- Complement: 5
- Armament: 2 detachable 2-ton side charges

The Stickleback-class submarines were midget submarines of the British Royal Navy initially ordered as improved versions of the older XE-class submarines. They were designed to allow British defences to practice defending against midget submarines since it was theorised the Soviet Union had or could develop such craft.

The Royal Navy developed plans to use these craft to carry a 15-kiloton nuclear naval mine (based on the Red Beard weapon) codenamed Cudgel into Soviet harbours. The project was unsuccessful as there were problems finding and paying for the necessary fissile material.

== Boats ==
There were four boats, launched 1954–1955:

- X51 Stickleback, launched 1 October 1954, sold to the Royal Swedish Navy in 1958 and was renamed Spiggen (Swedish name for "Stickleback"). After a period on display at the Imperial War Museum Duxford, and then in storage at Portsmouth Naval Dockyard, X51 was moved to the Scottish Submarine Centre in Helensburgh, where it has been on display since 2018.
- X52 Shrimp, launched October 1954, scrapped 1965
- X53 Sprat, launched 30 December 1954, loaned to US Navy 1958, scrapped 1966
- X54 Minnow, launched 5 May 1955, scrapped 1966
