= Robert Mudie =

British newspaper editor

Robert Mudie (28 June 1777– 29 April 1842) was a British newspaper editor, journalist, and author. He wrote books on a wide range of subjects including mathematics and astronomy, English history, geography and life. He was also a keen naturalist and wrote several books on natural history including on British birdlife. As a journalist, his reporting has been suggested as a possible inspiration for Charles Dickens' Oliver Twist.

== Life ==
Mudie was born in Angus, Scotland, was the youngest son of John Mudie, a weaver, and his wife Elizabeth (née Bany). He spent some time as a shepherd in the Sidlaw Hills. After attending the village school he worked as a weaver until he was drafted into the militia. Largely self-educated, from his boyhood he was an avid reader, studied mainly from the Encyclopædia Britannica. He taught himself Latin by beginning in the middle of Virgil, reading to the end, using a dictionary.

At the end of his four years of militia service he spent some time as weaver in Bucklemaker Wynd in Dundee. He became master of a village school in the south of Fife. In 1802, he was appointed teacher of Gaelic and drawing at Inverness Royal Academy, although he knew little Gaelic. About 1808, he became drawing-master to Dundee Academy, but soon also took on the department of arithmetic and English composition. His first writing was the poem ‘The Maid of Griban’ (1810) and his first novel Glenfergus came out a decade later in 1820. He contributed much to the local newspaper, and ran for some time a monthly periodical. Becoming a member of the Dundee town council, he worked energetically for burgh reform with R.S. Rintoul, editor of the radical Dundee Advertiser and later of The Spectator. In politics he was ‘an ardent reformer’. He had about this time some acquaintance with Thomas Chalmers, then in St Andrews. Mudie's speeches, attacking corruption on the council, led to the loss of his post as teacher of arithmetic (his drawing post was beyond the council's control). He tried, unsuccessfully, to start a mercantile and mathematical academy and launched two short-lived periodicals, The Independent (April–September 1816) and The Caledonian (June–October 1821).

On the failure of these, in the autumn of 1821 he sold his life appointment as teacher in drawing and moved to London, where he was a reporter on the Morning Chronicle, reporting George IV's visit to Edinburgh, which he also described in a volume, Modern Athens (1824). He was subsequently editor of The Sunday Times and wrote largely in the periodicals of the day.

About 1838, Mudie moved to Winchester, where he was employed by a bookseller named Robbins in writing books, including a History of Hampshire (3 vols., 1838) and a stream of other topographical volumes. The enterprise failed, and Mudie returned to London, impoverished and in broken health. He edited The Surveyor, Engineer and Architect, a monthly journal; it began publication in February 1840 but was not a financial success. Throughout this unsatisfactory and ultimately wretched career, Mudie maintained a steady flow of publications. His first works were The Maid of Griban (1819) (verses) and Glenfergus (3 vols., 1819), a novel. In the 1820s, he turned to topography, often writing in a moralizing tone, and produced a long list of volumes, of which two on London, Babylon the Great (2 vols., 1825) and A Second Judgment on Babylon the Great (2 vols., 1829) are the most striking. For Things in General (on London and elsewhere, 1824) he used the pseudonym Laurence Langshank. Mudie became a keen ornithologist and published several volumes, such as The Feathered Tribes of the British Islands (2 vols., 1834) and The Natural History of Birds (1834); he also wrote on other aspects of biology. He was also the author of books on natural philosophy, mental and moral philosophy, China, India, copyright, and the seasons of the year. Mudie wrote the greater part of the natural history section of the British Cyclopaedia (1834), the text to Gilbert's Modern Atlas of the Earth (1840), and a topographical account of Selborne prefixed to Gilbert White's Natural History of Selborne (new edn, 1850). Mudie died at Pentonville on 29 April 1842, leaving destitute the widow of his second marriage, Frances Wallace Urquhart, second daughter of Captain John Urquhart, a sea captain of the East India Company with four daughters and one son.

He wrote and compiled altogether about 90 volumes according to the Cyclopædia of English Literature (1844), including Babylon the Great – A Picture of Men and Things in London; Modern Athens, a sketch of Edinburgh society; The British Naturalist; The Feathered Tribes of Great Britain; A Popular Guide to the Observation of Nature; two series of four volumes each, entitled The Heavens, the Earth, the Sea, and the Air; and Spring, Summer, Autumn, and Winter; Man: Physical, Moral, Social, and Intellectual; Man, as a Moral and Accountable Being; The World Described; The Picture of Australia. He also wrote a novel, Glenfergus (1820), considered by Andrew Murray Scott to bear comparison with the gentle social satires of his Ayrshire contemporary, John Galt. He furnished the letter-press to Gilbert's Modern Atlas, the "Natural History" to the British Cyclopaedia, and numerous other contributions to periodical works. He was editor of the Caledonian Quarterly Magazine, as well as its illustrator and chief contributor. He hand-carved the woodcuts used to illustrate the Caledonian Quarterly.

The standard author abbreviation Mudie is used to indicate this person as the author when citing a botanical name.

== Other sources ==
- Robert Mudie and Dickens: A possible source for Oliver Twist, by Eva-Charlotta Mebius (2019) The Dickensian 115 (508), 128-142.
- Cyclopaedia of English Literature, by Robert Chambers, p. 700 (1884).
- Scottish Notes and Queries - Page 257, by Martim de Albuquerque - 1861
- July 1822 edition of The Edinburgh Magazine and Literary Miscellany at page 140.
- Blackwood's Edinburgh Magazine, 1822, page 768
- The Asiatic Journal and Monthly Register for British and Foreign India ... - Page 629 - 1822
- "Of Modern English Literary Men", The United States Democratic Review, Cornell University, April 1, 1839.
- Mudie, Robert (May 1844). "Reminiscences of Modern English Literary Men". The United States Democratic Review. Vol. 14. Cornell University. pp. 492–500.
- Goodwin, Gordon (1894). "Mudie, Robert" . In Lee, Sidney (ed.). Dictionary of National Biography. Vol. 39. London: Smith, Elder & Co.
