= Martin Smith (film maker) =

Martin Smith is a film maker who wrote and directed the 2006 Scottish BAFTA Award winning short Tracks and the BAFTA winning gameshow whodunnit series Armchair Detectives. He has also directed music videos for acts such as Arab Strap, The Delgados and King Creosote amongst others. His first short film, Accidents featured Kate Dickie (Red Road).

== Filmography ==
- 'Accidents' (2006) was made independently for Scottish Screen and produced by Nicki Young through Sugar Tree Productions. Starring Ryan Wallace, Kate Dickie and Julie Wilson.
- 'Tracks' (2006) was commissioned by the UK Film Council, Scottish Screen, and GMAC for the DigiCult scheme and made with producer Karen M Smyth of La Belle Allee Productions. It has won the BAFTA Scotland Award for Best Short Film, was highly commended at the TCM Turner Classic Shorts Competition, and nominated Best UK Short at Raindance. Starring David MacNeil, Ryan Wallace and Tony Martin.
- 'Jimmy' (2012), Smith's third commissioned short film, was made for the Scottish Documentary Institute, BBC Scotland and Creative Scotland. The film features disabled rights campaigner Jimmy McIntosh MBE. It was Nominated for the BAFTA New Talent Award from BAFTA Scotland for Best Director Of Photography, and won the Franklyn Marshall Award for Short Film at The CurtDoc International Documentary Festival in Spain.
- Armchair Detectives 2018, a gameshow whodunnit series for BBC One and Tiger Aspect Productions, was direct by Smith. The series won the 2018 BAFTA Scotland Award for Best Entertainment.

== Sources ==
- "With a good producer, cameraman and strong casting, not a lot can go wrong". Sunday Herald.
- Jimmy: Movie Review by Andrew Robertson | Eye For Film
- BAFTA New Talent Awards Nominations
- BAFTA Scotland Awards 2018
