= Helensburgh Parish Church =

Church in Helensburgh, Argyll and Bute, Scotland

Coordinates: 56.0048°N 4.7355°W

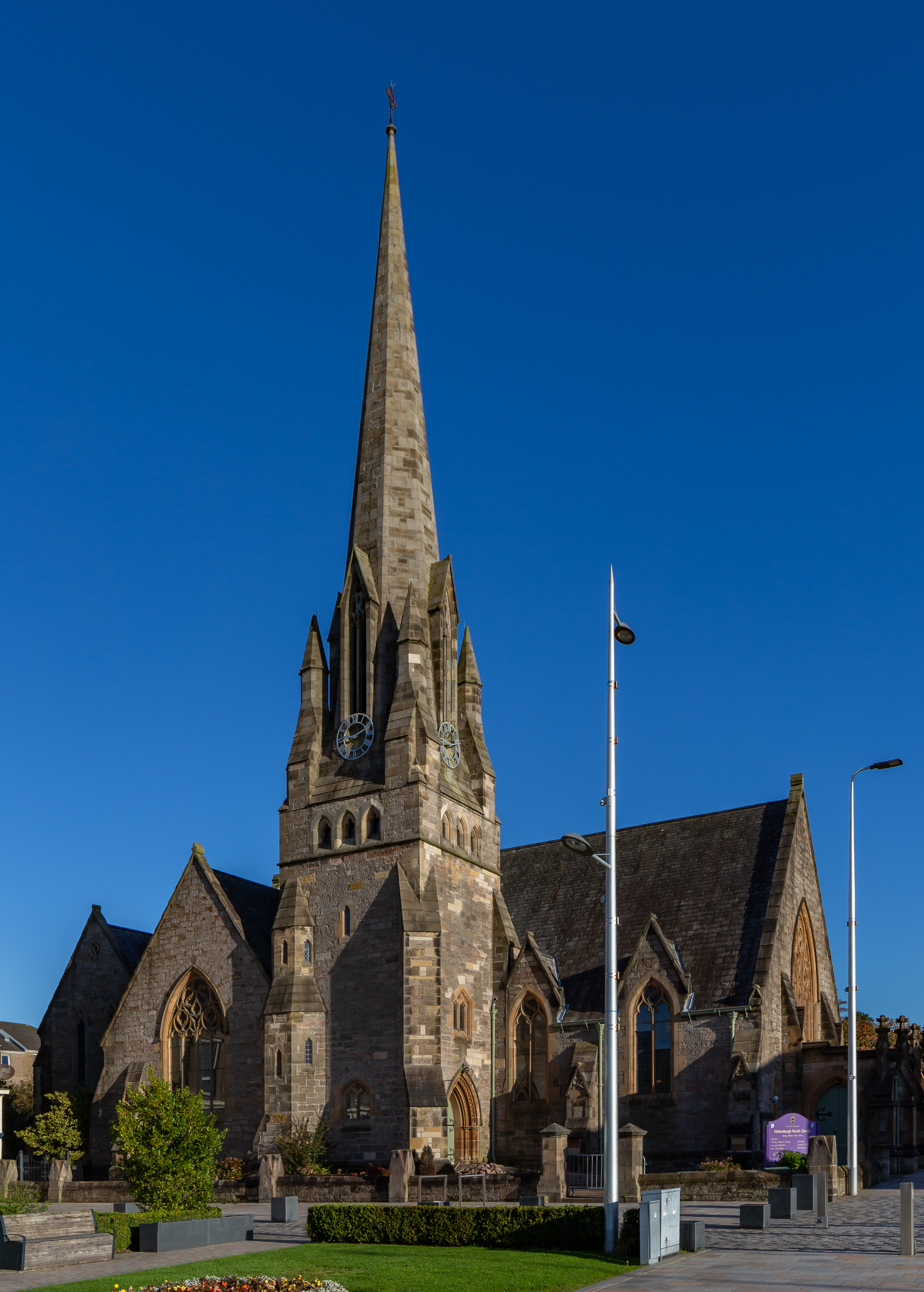
Helensburgh Parish Church (West Kirk)

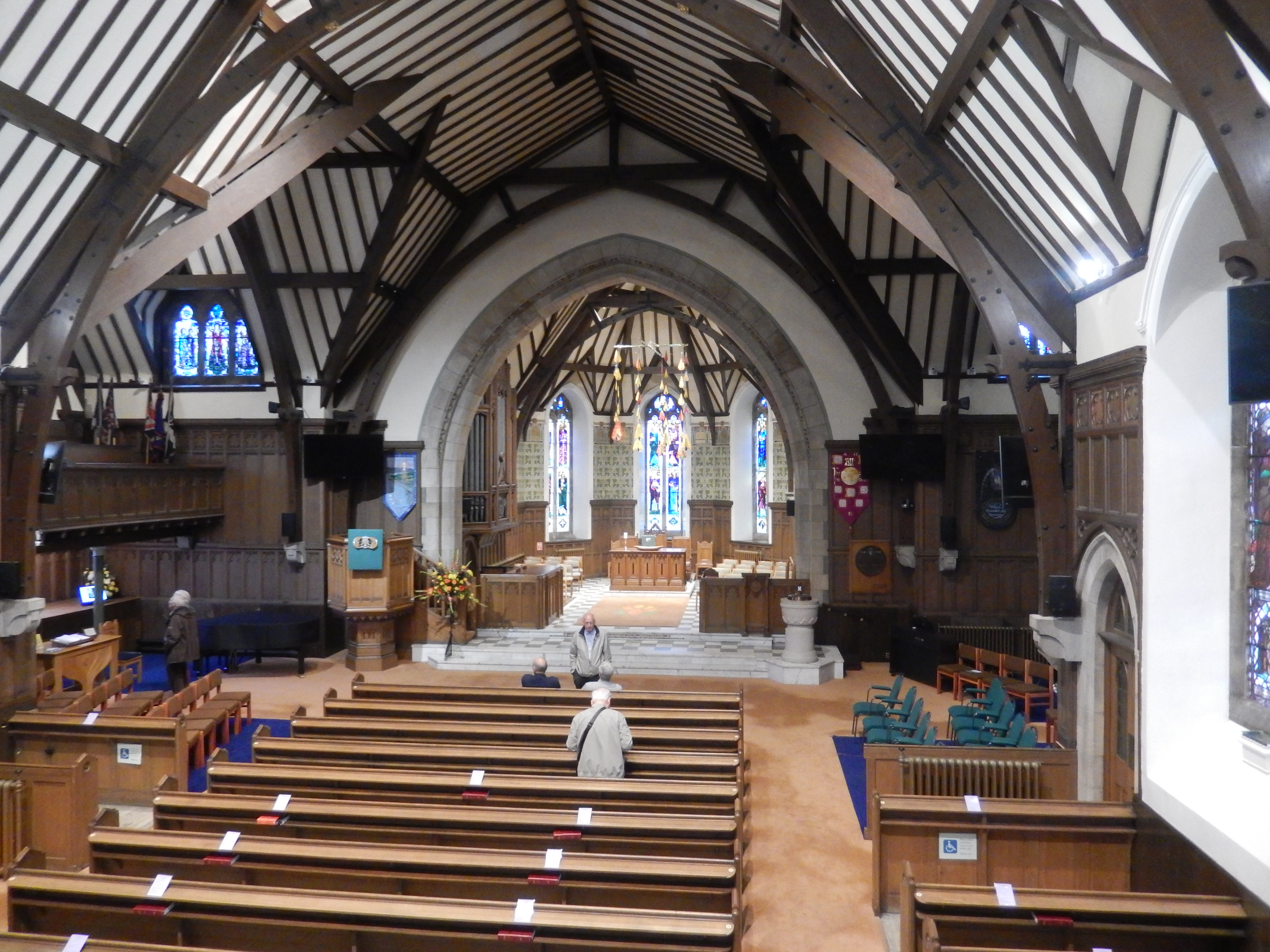
Interior of Helensburgh Parish Church

The West Kirk (since 2015 called Helensburgh Parish Church) is a Church of Scotland parish church on Colquhoun Square in Helensburgh, Argyll, Scotland. Designed by James Hay, in 1853, it is designated as a Category B listed building by Historic Environment Scotland.

In 2011 the church united with St Columba Church to become St Andrew's Kirk. The St Columba Church building became The Tower arts centre.

In 2015 St Andrew's Kirk united with Park Church to become Helensburgh Parish Church. In 2016 the Park Church building became the Buddhist Meditation Centre of Scotland.

In 2015, the Reverend David T. Young BA, BD Min (Hons), MTh became the first Parish Minister of Helensburgh Parish Church, later leaving to become a chaplain in the Royal Airforce.

In February 2025, the Reverend Susan Campbell MacGregor BD, MBA (formerly Associate Minister of Greyfriars Kirk in Edinburgh), took over the charge.
