= Jonathan Hulls =

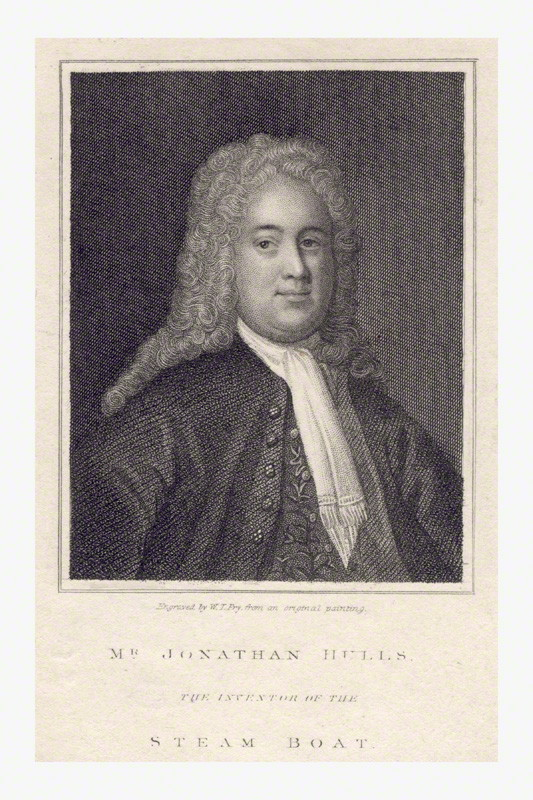
Jonathan Hulls

Jonathan Hulls or Hull (baptised 1699 – 1758) was an English inventor, a pioneer of steam navigation. Traditionally, he was recognised as the first person to make practical experiments with steam to propel a vessel; but evidence to substantiate the claim that he did more than propose a steam vessel on paper is lacking.

== Life ==
Hulls was born at Hanging Aston, Gloucestershire. It has been suggested that the background to the efforts of Hulls was the 1734 publication in the abridged Philosophical Transactions of a paper by the French engineer Monsieur Duquet on ships and mechanical propulsion. Duquet was a controversialist also active at that time in a debate on his ideas with Henri Pitot. He died in the middle of 1758 in Broad Campden, where he had lived almost all his adult life.

== Work ==
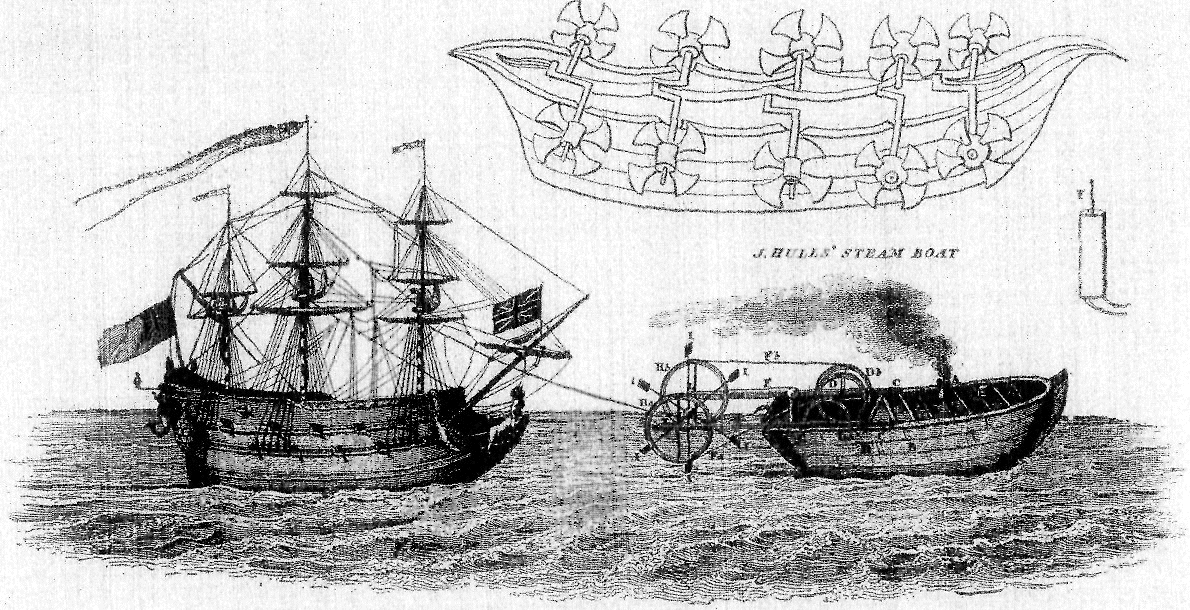
Hulls' 1736 proposal for a paddle-tug

The protection of his invention by Hulls depended on the financial support of his neighbour named Freeman at Batsford Park. The patent for the invention by Hulls is dated 21 December 1736, and his account of it appeared as Description and Draught of a new-invented Machine for carrying Vessels or Ships out of or into any Harbour, Port, or River against Wind and Tide, or in a Calm; for which his Majesty has granted Letters-patent for the sole benefit of the Author for the space of fourteen years (London, 1737). It was reprinted in facsimile in 1855.

A Newcomen engine was to be set up on a tow-boat in front of another vessel, connected by a tow-rope. Six paddles in the stern of the tow-boat were to be fastened to a cross axis connected by ropes to another axis which was turned by the engine. Hulls showed how to convert the rectilineal motion of a piston-rod into a rotatory motion.

The Oxford Dictionary of National Biography casts doubt on the traditional story about practical trials by Hulls. The Dictionary of National Biography first edition related that they were made on River Avon at Evesham in 1737; that they were a failure; and that Hulls was the butt of humour. This sentiment is displayed in a rhyme contrived by the people of Chipping Campden which was said to still be known in the area over 100 years after his passing:

Johnathan Hull
With his paper skull,
Tried hard to make a machine
That should go against wind and tide:
But he, like and ass,
Couldn't bring it to pass,
So at last was ashamed to be seen.

In 1754 Hulls published The Art of Measuring made Easy by the help of a new Sliding Scale; he also wrote the Maltmakers' Instructor.

== Influence ==
Augustus De Morgan says that Hulls's work very likely gave suggestions to William Symington; and that Erasmus Darwin was thinking of Hulls when he prophesied that steam would soon "drag the slow barge".

== Notes ==
Attribution

This article incorporates text from a publication now in the public domain: Lee, Sidney, ed. (1891). "Hulls, Jonathan". Dictionary of National Biography. Vol. 28. London: Smith, Elder & Co.
