= Scottish Submarine Centre =

Coordinates: 56.00532°N 4.73354°W

The Scottish Submarine Centre (SSC) is a submarine naval museum in west Scotland.

== History ==
It opened on 11 November 2017.

== Structure ==
It is situated on the A818.

== See also ==
- Royal Navy Submarine Museum in Gosport, Hampshire
