= Stalag II-B =

German WWII prisoner of war camp in Pomerania

- Hammerstein (Czarne), Pomerania
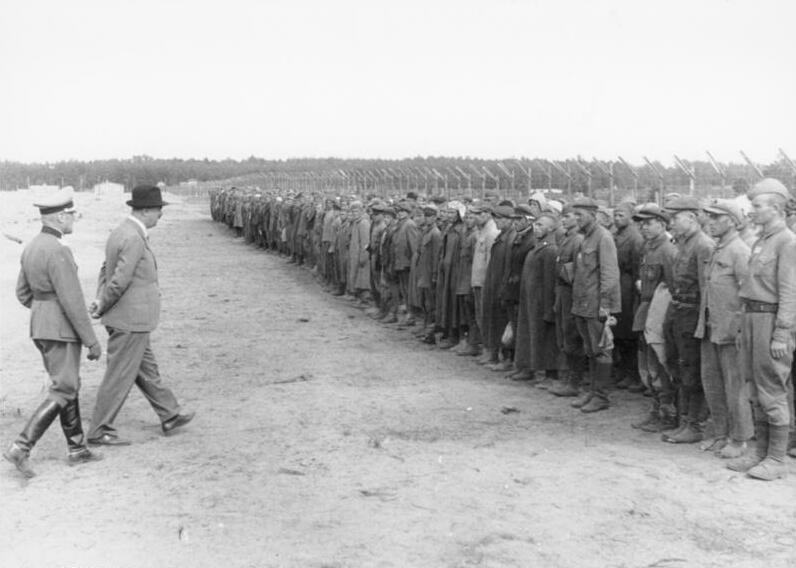
- A delegation of the International Red Cross led by Prof. Carl Jacob Burckhardt inspect POWs at Stalag II-B, 9 August 1941

Site information
- Type: Prisoner-of-war camp
- Controlled by: Nazi Germany

Location
- Hammerstein, Germany (pre-war borders, 1937) Stalag II-B (Germany)
- Coordinates: 53.6853°N 16.9096°E

Site history
- In use: 1939–1945
- Battles/wars: World War II

Garrison information
- Occupants: Polish, French, Belgian, Serbian, Dutch, Soviet, Italian, American, Senegalese, Malagasy, Tunisian, Moroccan, Algerian and other Allied prisoners of war

Stalag II-B was a German World War II prisoner-of-war camp situated 2.4 kilometres (1.5 mi) west of the town of Hammerstein, Pomerania (now Czarne, Pomeranian Voivodeship, Poland) on the north side of the railway line. It housed Polish, French, Belgian, Serbian, Dutch, Soviet, Italian and American prisoners of war.

== Camp history ==
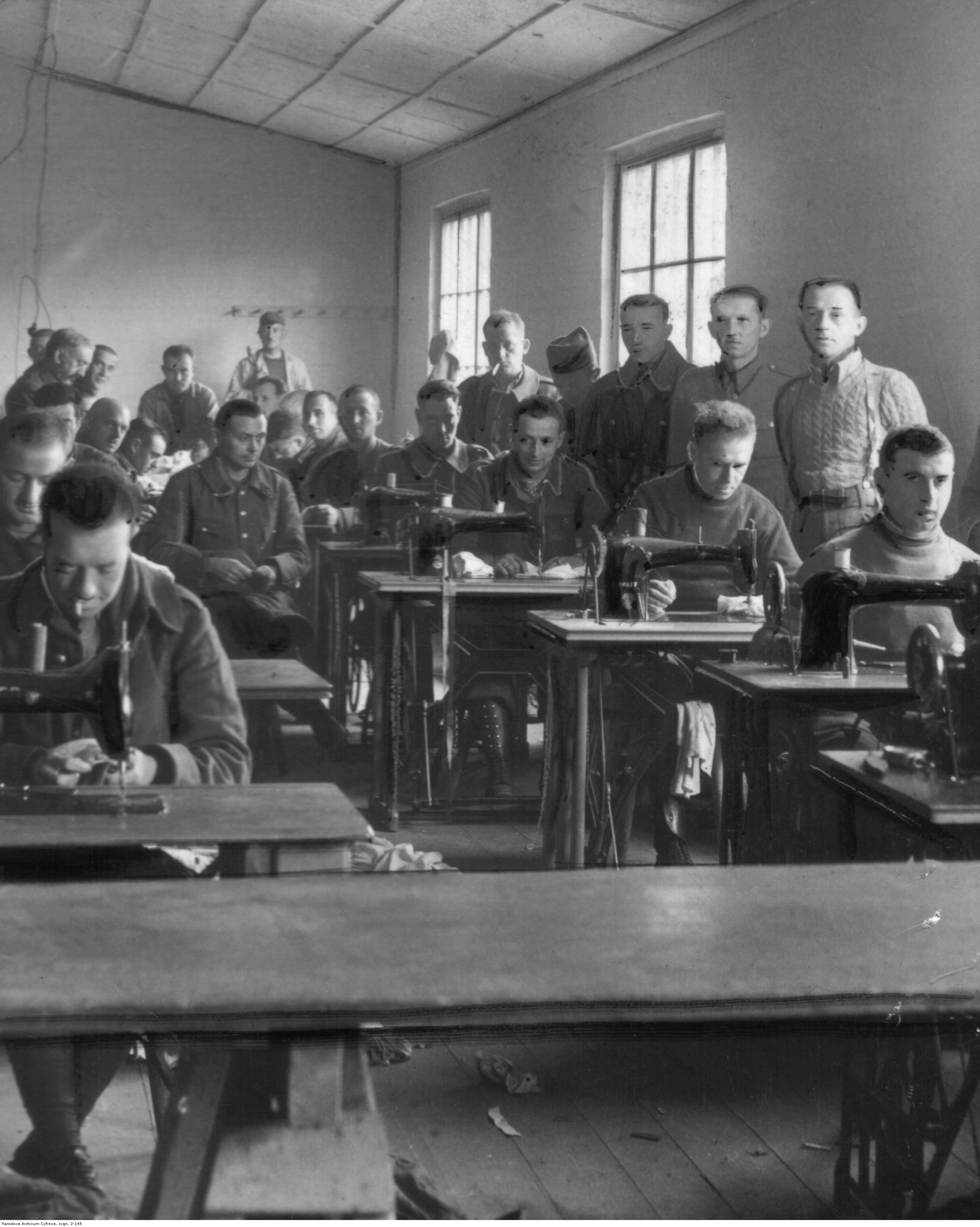
Polish POWs in Stalag II-B

The camp was situated on a former army training ground (Übungsplatz), and had been used during World War I as a camp for Russian prisoners. In 1933 it was established as one of the first Nazi concentration camps, to house German communists, however, it was dissolved after several months, and the prisoners were deported elsewhere. In late September 1939 the camp was changed to a prisoner-of-war camp to house Polish soldiers from the September Campaign, particularly those from the Pomorze Army. By mid-September 1939, there were some 3,000 Polish POWs in the camp, and the number further grew afterwards. At first they lived in tents, throughout the severe winter of 1939–1940, and construction of all the huts was not completed until 1941. Cold combined with poor sanitary conditions and food rations, resulted in widespread diseases and many deaths. In May–June 1940, during and following the German invasion of France and Belgium, French and Belgian prisoners began to arrive. To make room for them, many of the Poles were forced to relinquish their POW status to become civilian slave laborers, in a violation of the Geneva Conventions, and some were offered to sign on the Volksliste. Faced with poor results, the Germans subjected the Poles to starvation and terror, as well as deportations to heavy labor subcamps. Polish Jewish POWs were assigned to hard and humiliating work. In December 1940, 1,691 Polish prisoners were recorded as being there. Lack of warm clothing and malnutrition resulted in high mortality among POWs from Morocco, Algeria, Tunisia, Senegal, French Sudan, Madagascar and Indochina. In April 1941, Serbian POWs were brought to the camp.

Since October 1939, Polish POWs were sent to newly formed forced labour subcamps in the area, to work in forestry and agriculture. Eventually POWs of various nationalities were sent to numerous forced labour subcamps (Arbeitskommando) located in various cities, towns and villages in Pomerania and northern Greater Poland. Many POWs often recalled German abuse in the subcamps.

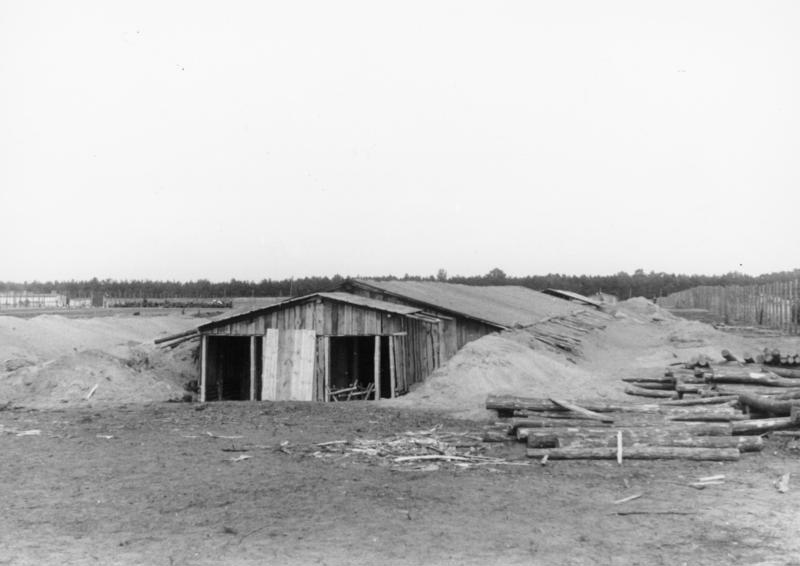
Barrack hut of Stalag II B under construction, 1941

On the initiative of the Polish POWs, a camp infirmary was organized, led by Polish doctor and POW Edmund Mroczkiewicz. The infirmary was also the focal point of the Polish resistance organization Odra, and Mroczkiewicz was its member. The organization was involved in intelligence, diversion and sabotage actions.

The construction of the second camp, Lager-Ost ("East Compound") began in June 1941 to accommodate the large numbers of Soviet prisoners taken in Operation Barbarossa, including ethnic Russians, Belarusians, Ukrainians, Lithuanians, Latvians, Estonians, Finns, as well as Polish civilians from Soviet prisons, often accidentally classified as POWs. It was located south of the railway tracks. In November 1941 a typhoid fever epidemic broke out in Lager-Ost, which lasted until March 1942, claiming some 40,000-50,000 victims. The Germans decided to treat the epidemic only when the first cases of disease occurred among German personnel. A total of 38,383 Soviet POWs were held Stalag II B.

There were attempts to escape from the camp or its subcamps. German guards shot at those escaping without warning, and POWs captured after a chase were either murdered or sent to penal subcamps and later to concentration camps, mainly Gross-Rosen and Stutthof.

In August 1943 the first American prisoners arrived, having been taken prisoner in the Tunisian campaign. From September 1943, also Italian POWs were brought to the camp. In April 1945 the camp was liberated by the Soviet Red Army.

== United States Army Official Report, 1 November 1945 ==
=== The prison ===
In August 1943 the Stalag was reported as newly opened to privates of the US ground forces with a strength of 451. The Hammerstein installation acted as a headquarters for work detachments in the region and seldom housed more than one fifth of the POWs credited to it. Thus at the end of May 1944, although the strength was listed as 4,807, only 1,000 of these were in the enclosure. At its peak in January 1945, the camp strength was put at 7,200 Americans, with some 5,315 of these out on 9 major Arbeitskommando ("Work Companies").

=== Description ===
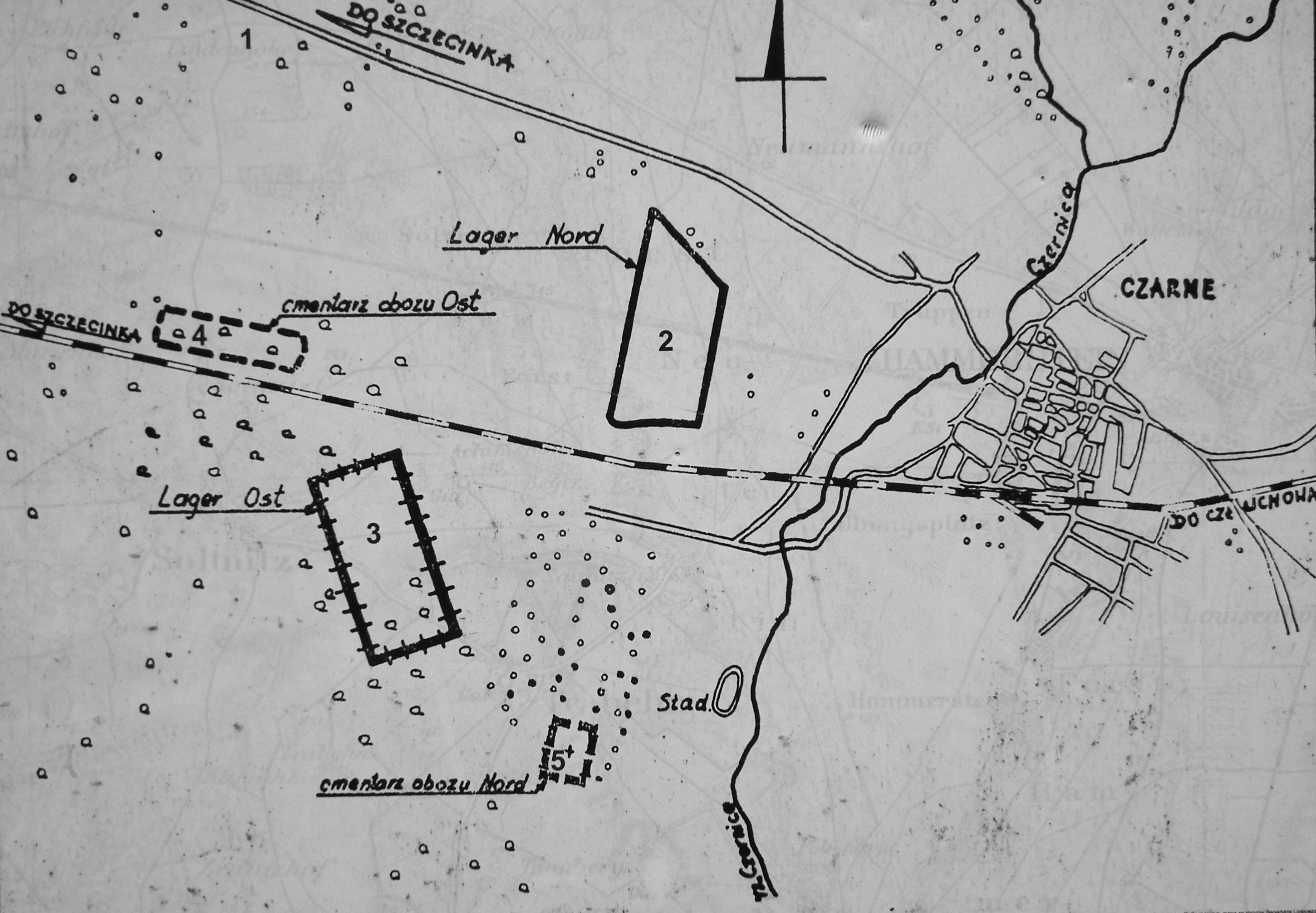
Map of the Stalag IIB POW compounds

The camp sprawled over 25 acres (10 ha) surrounded by the usual two barbed-wire fences. Additional fences formed compounds and sub-compounds. Ten thousand Russians were detained in the East Compound, while the other nationalities — 16,000 French, 1,600 Serbs, 900 Belgians — and the Americans were segregated by nationality in the North Compound. Within the American enclosure were the playing field, workshops and dispensary, showers, and delouser. At times more than 600 men were quartered in each of the three single-story barracks 45 feet (14 m) wide and 180 feet (55 m) long. Despite these extremely crowded barracks, conditions contrasted well with the Russian barracks which held as many as 1,000 POWs apiece. Barracks were divided in two by a centre washroom which had twenty taps. Water fit for drinking was available at all hours except during the last two months when it was turned off for part of the day. Bunks were the regulation POW triple-decker bunk beds with excelsior mattresses and one German blanket (plus two from the Red Cross) for each man. In the front and rear of each barracks was a urinal to be used only at night. Three stoves provided what heat there was for the front half of each barrack, and two for the rear half. The fuel ration was always insufficient, and in December 1944 was cut to its all-time low of 26 pounds (12 kg) of coal per stove per day. On warm days the Germans withheld part of the fuel ration.

=== German personnel ===
- Commandant - Oberstleutnant Von Bernuth
- Commandant - Oberst Von Keppler
- Executive Officer - Oberstleutnant Segars
- Kommando Officer - Hauptmann Springer
- Security Officer- Hauptmann Giesel
- Medical Officer- Hauptmann Wagner
- Chief Censor - Unteroffizier Krause
- Lager NCO - Feldwebel Kohler
- Kommando NCO - Unteroffizer Wendorf

=== Forced labor ===
Except for housekeeping chores benefiting POWs, no work was performed in the Stalag. All men fit to work were set out to Kommandos where conditions approximated the following: A group of 29 Americans were taken under guard to a huge farm 6 kilometres (3.7 mi) from Słupsk (then Stolp), where 12 French POWs were already working without guards. Americans were billeted in a section of a large brick-floored barn. Adjoining sections were occupied by pigs, cattle and grain. POWs slept on double-decker bunk beds under two blankets. The French had a small building of their own. Guards lived in a small room opening onto the Americans' quarters.

Each day the men rose at 06:00 and breakfasted on Red Cross food and potato soup, bread and hot water (for coffee) which they drew from the farm kitchen. At 06:30 they washed their spoons and enameled bowls and cleaned their barracks. They shaved and washed themselves in three large wash pans filled from a single spigot which gave only cold water. The outdoor latrine was a 3-seater. At 07:00 they rode out to potato fields in horse-drawn wagons driven by "coldly hostile German farmhands" who would welcome the opportunity to shoot a "kriege." Under the watchful, armed guards they dug potatoes until 11:30 when they rode back to the farm for the noon meal. This consisted of Red Cross food supplemented by German vegetable soup. Boarding the wagons at 13:00, POWs worked until 16:30. The evening meal at 17:00 consisted of Red Cross food and the farmers' issue of soup, potatoes and gravy. After this meal they could sit outdoors in the fenced-in pen of 30 feet (9.1 m) by 8 feet (2.4 m) until 18:30, after which the guard locked them in their section for the night.

On Sundays, the guard permitted POWs to lounge or to walk back and forth in the "yard" all day, but they spent a good deal of their time scrubbing their barracks and washing their clothing. Sunday dinner from the farm usually include a meat pudding and cheese. Once a month each POW received a large Red Cross food box containing four regulation Red Cross parcels. These were transmitted to distant Kommandos by rail and to nearby units by German Army trucks. Parcels were stored in the guards' room until issued. The average tour of duty on a farm Kommando lasted indefinitely. On other work detachments it lasted until the specific project had been completed.

=== Evacuation and liberation ===
On 28 January 1945, POWs received instructions to be ready to evacuate the camp at 08:00 hours the following morning. Upon receipt of these instructions, M/Sgt. John M. McMahan, the "Man of Confidence" (MOC) (a prisoner selected to liaise with the camp authorities) set up a plan of organisation based on 25-man groups and 200 man companies with NCOs in charge. On the day of the evacuation, however, POWs were moved out of camp in such a manner that the original plan was of little assistance. German guards ordered POWs to fall out of the barracks. When 1,200 men had assembled on the road, the remaining 500 were allowed to stay in the barracks. A disorganised column of 1,200 marched out into the cold and snow. The guards were considerate, and Red Cross food was available.

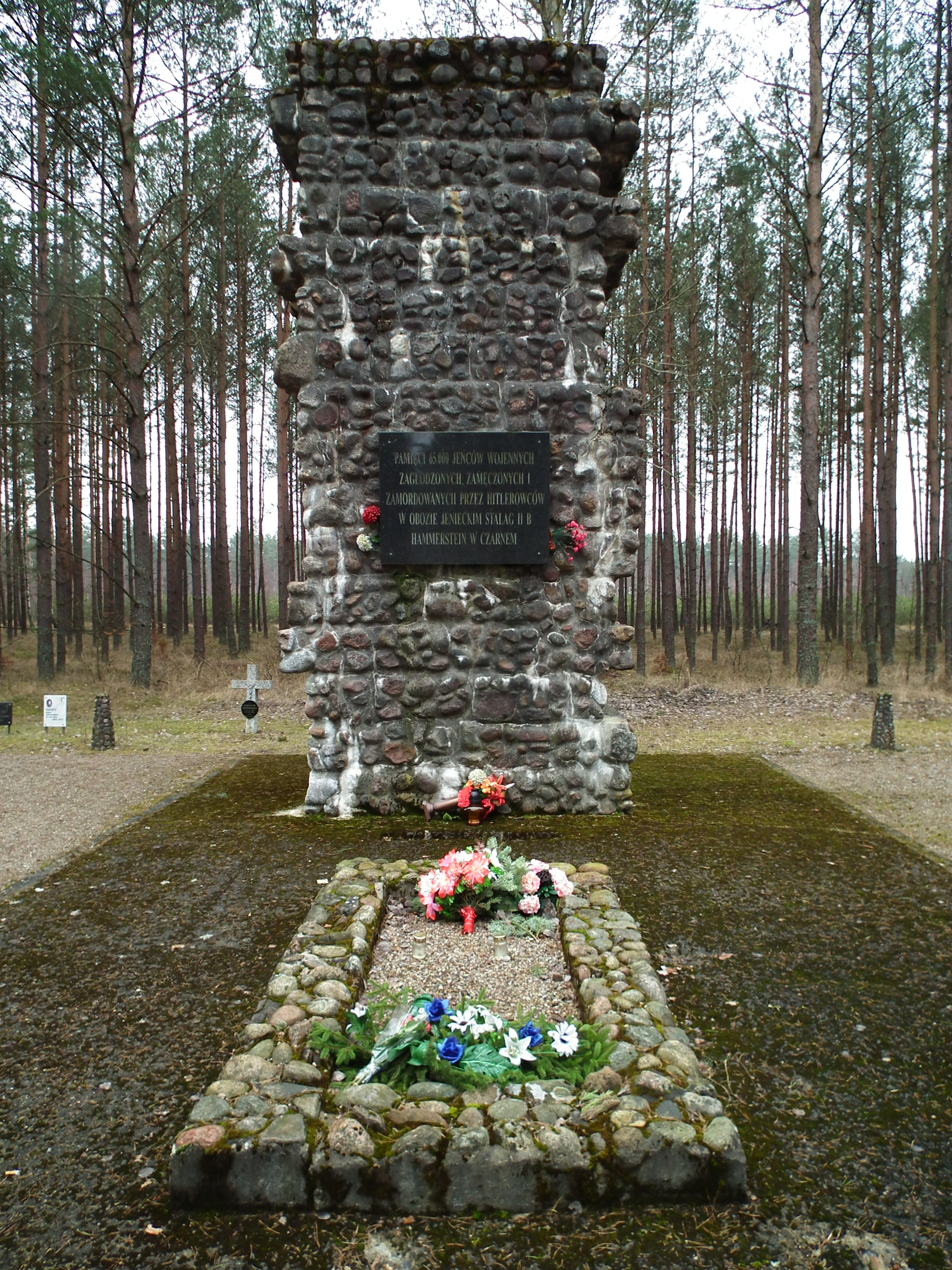
Memorial to 65,000 prisoners of war who died or were murdered by the Germans in Stalag II-B

After the first day, the column was broken down into three groups of 400 men each, with NCOs in charge of each group. For the next three months, the column was on the move, marching an average of 22 kilometres (14 mi) a day 6 days a week. German rations were neither regular nor adequate. At almost every stop McMahan bartered coffee, cigarettes, or chocolate for potatoes which he issued to the men. Bread, the most important item, was not issued regularly. When it was needed most it was never available. The soup was, as a rule, typical watery German soup, but several times POW got a good, thick dried-pea soup. Through the activity of some of the key NCOs, Red Cross food was obtained from POW camps passed by the column on the march.

Without it, it is doubtful that the majority of men could have finished the march. The ability of the men to steal helped a lot. The weather was atrocious. It always seemed to be either bitter cold or raining or snowing. Quarters were usually unheated barns and stables. Sometimes they slept unsheltered on the ground; sometimes they were fortunate enough to find a heated barn. Except for one period when Red Cross food was exhausted and guards became surly, morale of the men remained at a high level. Practically all the men shaved at every opportunity and kept their appearance as neat as possible under the circumstances. From time to time weak POWs would drop out of the column and wait to be picked up by other columns which were on the move.

Thus at Dahlen on 6–7 March the column dwindled to some 900 American POWs. On 19 March at Tramm, 800 men were sent to work on Kommandos, leaving only 133 POWs who were joined a week later by the Large Kommando Company from Lauenberg. On 13 April the column was strafed by four Spitfires near Dannenberg. Ten POWs were killed. The rest of the column proceeded to Marlag X-C, Westertimke, where they met the men they had left behind at Stalag II-B who had left on 18 February, reached Stalag X-B after an easy three-day trip, and then moved on to adjacent Marlag X-C on 16 April. Westertimke was liberated by the British on 28 April 1945.

== See also ==
- List of POW camps in Germany
