= Hugh Bruce =

British Army officer (1919–2003)

Hugh Glenrinnes Bruce
- Born: 26 January 1919; Mhow, India
- Died: 9 January 2003 (aged 83)
- Military career
- Allegiance: United Kingdom
- Branch: Royal Marines
- Service years: 1937–1957
- Rank: Major
- Unit: Royal Marines
- Commands: Special Boat Service
- Conflicts: Second World War: Defence of Calais; Cyprus Emergency
- Awards: Mentioned in Despatches (3)

Hugh Glenrinnes Bruce (26 January 1919 – 9 January 2003) was a prisoner of war in Colditz Castle and later commanding officer of the Special Boat Service.

== Early life ==
Hugh Glenrinnes Bruce was born at Mhow in India, where his father was serving with the Royal Army Medical Corps on attachment to the Indian Army. He was educated at Blundell's School in Tiverton.

== Military career ==
Bruce joined the Royal Marines in 1937. He was commissioned a year later, and served briefly in the battleship HMS Rodney before being selected for the Calais force.

=== Capture ===
Bruce was part of Captain Darby Courtice's company of 85 Royal Marines when it landed at Calais shortly after midnight on 25 May 1940. With one other officer, Lieutenant David Hunter, they were charged with helping French marines to defend the ancient citadel at the centre of the town. There they were attacked by the full might of XIX Panzer Corps and, by early evening, were surrounded and out of ammunition. They had fought with such vigour that the official German record read, "The enemy gives the impression of being fresh, and seems to have received reinforcements after two days of heavy fighting."

When Calais fell Bruce sought to escape but was captured and marched across northern France to the German frontier, and then on to Laufen camp in Bavaria. In the spring of 1941 he was moved to Stalag XXI-D (Posen), a punishment camp set up in response to the supposed ill-treatment of German prisoners in Canada. Here, Bruce and his comrades were kept underground in deplorable conditions, which resulted in Bruce contracting pompholyx, brought on by poor nutrition and lack of sunlight.

Then, after a short spell at Oflag V-B Biberach camp on the Swiss border, he was moved to the naval camp, Marlag, part of Stalag X-B at Sandbostel, from which he made a number of escapes. The first, with Flight Lieutenant Peter Wild, resulted in only 40 minutes of freedom after they had attached themselves to a working party, then run off while on a wood collecting trip in the forest. Hunter, Bruce's fellow Marine officer, was imprisoned with him and, over the winter of 1941–42, the two men became firm friends.

With a number of colleagues they conceived, designed and built by hand a masterpiece of British engineering – a 251-yard-long tunnel, complete with rest bay, electric lighting and air flow system, as well as a signalling device to warn of the approach of sentries. Over 100 tons of soil was excavated and concealed under a hut. On 7 April 1942 Bruce, Hunter and ten other officers made their escape.

After 12 days on the run Bruce and Hunter were captured near Flensburg, within a few hundred yards of the Danish border. After a brief spell back at Sandbostel, the pair escaped, this time by jumping aboard a prison lorry, but were recaptured at Hamburg railway station by the German police.

=== Colditz ===
In August 1942 Bruce and Hunter were imprisoned in Colditz Castle (then prisoner of war camp Oflag IV-C), where Bruce's skills were immediately put to good use (he was a talented lock-picker and at a reunion at Colditz 40 years later, he managed to pick the lock of his cell before a disgruntled East German guard was able to find the correct key).

The three Royal Marine officers (Captain Courtice, their company commander at Calais, was also at Colditz) had a reputation for bravery and good humour, and Bruce was always a willing volunteer for whatever was being planned. He was involved in a number of escape attempts, including a particularly bold one in which one of his comrades, Mike Sinclair, impersonated a senior German NCO. But all these attempts failed, and Bruce remained in Colditz until his release in April 1945.

=== Post-war ===
After the war Bruce continued in the Royal Marines, serving in British Columbia, Malta and Suez. He was second-in-command of 40 Commando, and joined the Special Boat Service in 1950, becoming its commanding officer in 1952. He was promoted to major 31 December 1953. Bruce was mentioned in dispatches three times: for his part in the defence of Calais in 1940; for the organisation of the Sandbostel tunnel; and for anti-terrorist operations against Grivas's EOKA in Cyprus whilst serving with 40 Commando.

Bruce retired from the Royal Marines in 1957.

== Civilian life ==
In 1951 he married Jean Rowland Farrant, then head model at the House of Worth.

Bruce set up Sea Services Shipping, which surveyed the proposed route of the Channel Tunnel, and provided supply ships to the oil industry. Bruce ran the company for nearly 30 years. Later he established Bruce Maritime, which specialised in deepwater buoys in the North Sea.

In addition to his interest in wildlife, shooting and fishing, Bruce was a keen yachtsman – while in Colditz, he had won third prize in a competition organised by the Royal Ocean Racing Club for prisoners of war to design an offshore racing yacht (the first prize went to another Colditz prisoner, Flight Lieutenant Welch).

Bruce competed in 10 Fastnet races (coming first of class in Uomie in 1953) and numerous Admiral's Cup regattas. A meticulous planner in every aspect of his life, Bruce became a much sought after navigator and tactician; in his sixties he was engaged by the Swiss Admiral's Cup team as tactician on their 1981 challenge. He also wrote extensively on race tactics and navigation.

Bruce also founded the Royal Marines' Canoe Club, and in 1952, with his Royal Marine colleague David Mitchell, broke the world record for crossing the English Channel in a two-man canoe.

Hugh Glenrinnes Bruce died in 2003 in North Walsham, Norfolk.

== Bibliography ==
- The Bruces of Kildrummy. 1992. ISBN 978-0-9518577-0-0

== Sources ==
- Extracted from the obituary of Major Hugh Bruce, The Daily Telegraph, 23 January 2003
