= Admiral Meyer =

Admiral Meyer may refer to:

- Hans Karl Meyer (1898–1989), German Kriegsmarine flotilla admiral
- Wayne E. Meyer (1926–2009), U.S. Navy rear admiral

== See also ==
- Alfred Meyer-Waldeck (1864–1928), Imperial German Navy vice admiral
