= Tirpitz Museum =

The Tirpitz Museum may refer to:

- Tirpitz Museum (Denmark), focused on the Atlantic Wall in Denmark.
- Tirpitz Museum (Norway), focused on the battleship of same name.
