= Godfrey Place =

Royal Navy officer and Victoria Cross recipient

Rear-Admiral Godfrey Place VC CB CVO DSC
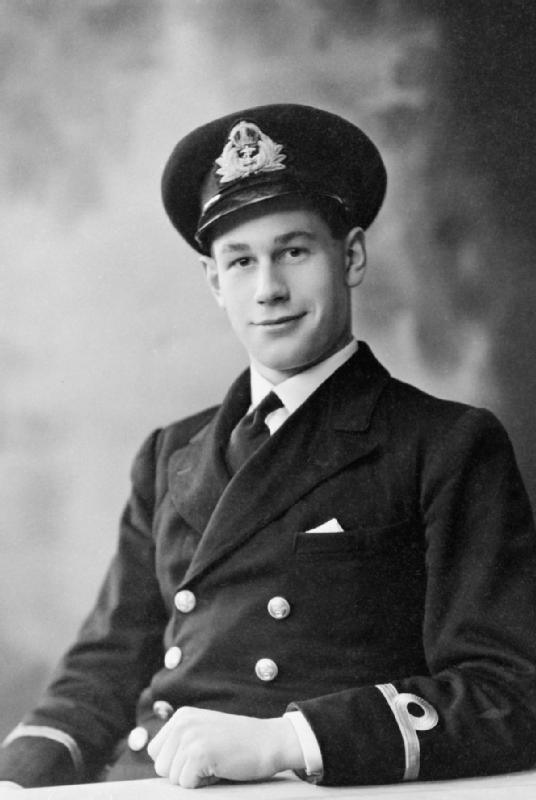
- Sub-Lieutenant Godfrey Place c. 1941
- Born: Basil Charles Godfrey Place; 19 July 1921; Little Malvern, Worcestershire
- Died: 27 December 1994 (aged 73); Holborn, London
- Burial place: Corton Denham Cemetery
- Military career
- Allegiance: United Kingdom
- Branch: Royal Navy
- Service years: 1935–1970
- Rank: Rear-Admiral
- Commands: HMS Albion (1966–67); HMS Ganges (1963–65); HMS Rothesay (1962–63); HMS Tumult (1955–56); HMS X7 (1943)
- Conflicts: Second World War: Battle of the Mediterranean; Operation Source; Korean War
- Awards: Victoria Cross; Companion of the Order of the Bath; Commander of the Royal Victorian Order; Distinguished Service Cross; Cross of Valour (Poland); Commander of the Military Order of Aviz (Portugal)
- Other work: Chairman of the Victoria Cross and George Cross Association (1971–94)

Rear-Admiral Basil Charles Godfrey Place, VC, CB, CVO, DSC (19 July 1921 – 27 December 1994) was an officer in the Royal Navy and a recipient of the Victoria Cross, the highest award for gallantry in the face of the enemy that can be awarded to British and Commonwealth forces.

== Naval career ==
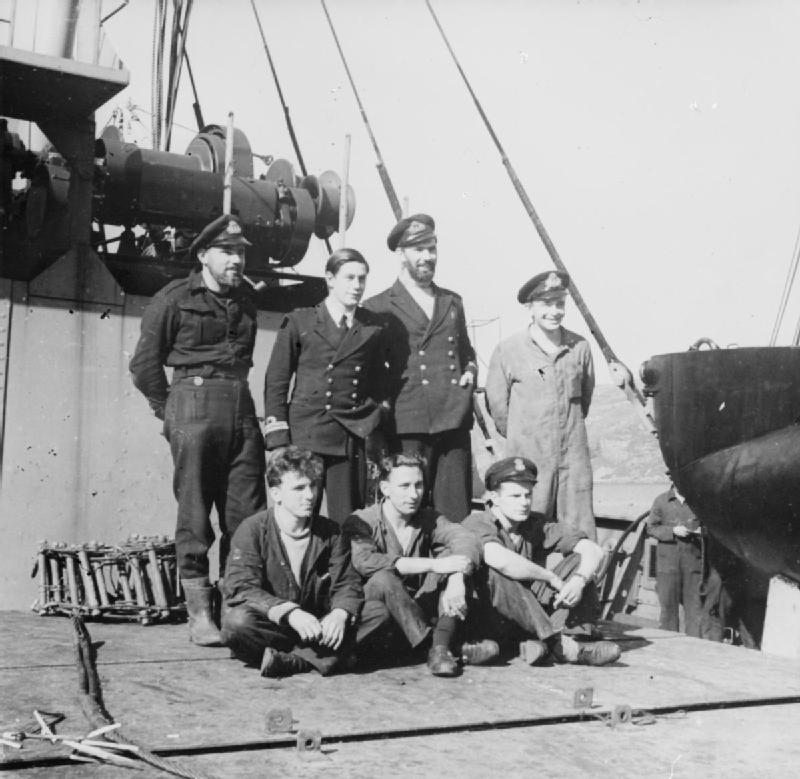
Place (standing, second from left) with other midget submarine personnel

Place was 22 years old, and a lieutenant in the Royal Navy during the Second World War, when the following deed took place for which he was awarded the VC. On 22 September 1943 at Kåfjord, North Norway, Lieutenant Place, commanding Midget Submarine X7, and another lieutenant (Donald Cameron) commanding Midget Submarine X.6, carried out a most daring and successful attack on the German Battleship Tirpitz. The two submarines had to travel at least 1,000 miles from base, negotiate a mine-field, dodge nets, gun defenses and enemy listening posts. Having eluded all these hazards they finally placed the charges underneath the ship where they went off an hour later, doing so much damage that Tirpitz was out of action for months.

Place and other five officers captured at Kåfjord were transferred to Marlag-O, the German prison camp for British naval officers at Westertimke.

The full citation was published in a supplement to the London Gazette of 18 February 1944 (dated 22 February 1944) and read:

ADMIRALTY.

Whitehall. 22nd February, 1944.

The KING has been graciously pleased to approve the award of the VICTORIA CROSS for valour to:

Lieutenant Basil Charles Godfrey Place, D.S.C., Royal Navy.

Lieutenant Donald Cameron, R.N.R.

Lieutenants Place and Cameron were the Commanding Officers of two of His Majesty's Midget Submarines X 7 and X 6 which on 22nd September 1943 carried out a most daring and successful attack on the German Battleship Tirpitz, moored in the protected anchorage of Kaafiord, North Norway.

To reach the anchorage necessitated the penetration of an enemy minefield and a passage of fifty miles up the fiord, known to be vigilantly patrolled by the enemy and to be guarded by nets, gun defences and listening posts, this after a passage of at least a thousand miles from base.

Having successfully eluded all these hazards and entered the fleet anchorage, Lieutenants Place and Cameron, with a complete disregard for danger, worked their small craft past the close anti-submarine and torpedo nets surrounding the Tirpitz, and from a position inside these nets, carried out a cool and determined attack.

Whilst they were still inside the nets a fierce enemy counter attack by guns and depth charges developed which made their withdrawal impossible. Lieutenants Place and Cameron therefore scuttled their craft to prevent them falling into the hands of the enemy. Before doing so they took every measure to ensure the safety of their crews, the majority of whom, together with themselves, were subsequently taken prisoner.

In the course of the operation these very small craft pressed home their attack to the full, in doing so accepting all the dangers inherent in such vessels and facing every possible hazard which ingenuity could devise for the protection in harbour of vitally important Capital Ships.

The courage, endurance and utter contempt for danger in the immediate face of the enemy shown by Lieutenants Place and Cameron during this determined and successful attack were supreme.

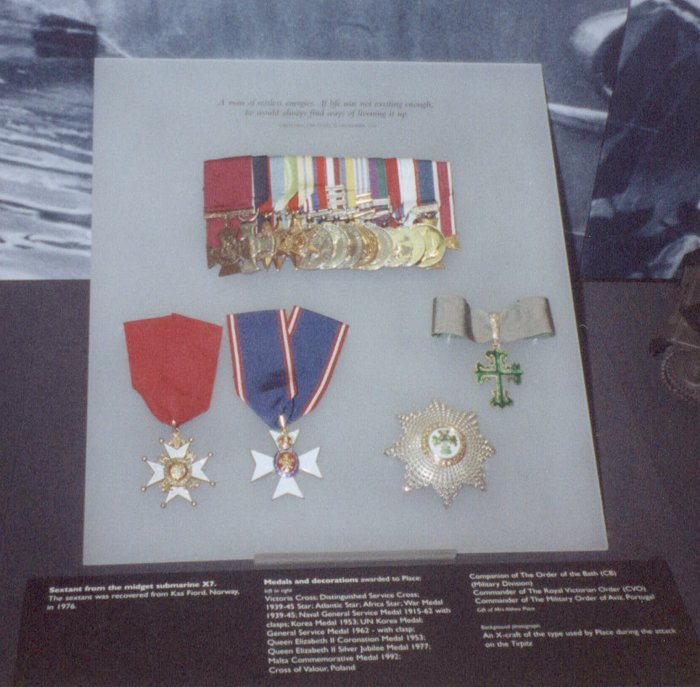
His Medal Collection at the Imperial War Museum

Place was awarded the Polish Cross of Valour for his service as liaison officer in the Polish submarine ORP Sokół and the Distinguished Service Cross for his role in the sinking of the Italian submarine Guglielmotti by HMS Unbeaten off Sicily in March 1942.

In 1950, Place took the unusual step for a submariner of transferring to the Fleet Air Arm, training as a pilot and gaining his "wings" in 1952. Later that year he saw action in the Korean War, flying the Sea Fury in 801 Squadron from the deck of the carrier HMS Glory. He later achieved the rank of rear admiral, and retired from the navy in June 1970.

== The medal ==
Place's Victoria Cross is displayed at the Imperial War Museum in London.
