= Donald Cameron (VC) =

Scottish recipient of the Victoria Cross (1916–1961)

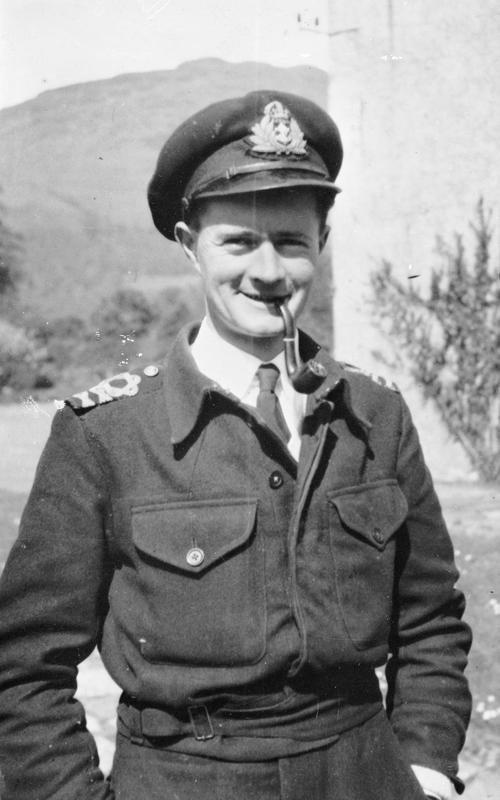
- Lieutenant Donald Cameron in September 1943
- Born: 18 March 1916; Carluke, South Lanarkshire, Scotland
- Died: 10 April 1961 (aged 45); Royal Hospital Haslar, Gosport, England
- Military career
- Allegiance: United Kingdom
- Branch: Royal Navy
- Service years: 1939–1961
- Rank: Commander
- Commands: HMS Tiptoe (P332); HMS Trump (P333); HMS Dolphin; HMS X6
- Conflicts: Second World War: Operation Source
- Awards: Victoria Cross

Commander Donald Cameron, VC (18 March 1916 – 10 April 1961) was a Scottish sailor and a recipient of the Victoria Cross, the highest award for gallantry in the face of the enemy that can be awarded to British and Commonwealth forces. He is one of three VC recipients from the small town of Carluke in South Lanarkshire (population 14,000). The Rotary Club of Carluke have erected a millennium stone in the town market place to commemorate this.

== Naval career ==
Cameron served in the Merchant Navy from the age of 17. He was 27 years old, and a lieutenant in the Royal Naval Reserve during the Second World War, when the following deed took place for which he was awarded the VC.

On 22 September 1943 at Kåfjord on the Altafjord, North Norway, lieutenant Cameron, commanding Midget Submarine X.6, and another lieutenant (Basil Charles Godfrey Place) commanding Midget Submarine X.7, carried out a successful attack on the German Battleship Tirpitz. The small submarines had to travel at least 1,000 miles from base, negotiate a minefield, dodge nets, gun defences and enemy listening posts. Having eluded all these hazards they finally placed the charges underneath the ship where they went off an hour later, doing so much damage that the Tirpitz was out of action for months.

Cameron and other five officers captured at Kåfjord were transferred to Marlag-O, the German prison camp for British naval officers at Westertimke.

The full citation was published in a supplement to The London Gazette of 18 February 1944 (dated 22 February 1944) and read:

ADMIRALTY.

Whitehall. 22nd February, 1944.

The KING has been graciously pleased to approve the award of the VICTORIA CROSS for valour to:

Lieutenant Basil Charles Godfrey Place, D.S.C., Royal Navy.

Lieutenant Donald Cameron, R.N.R.

Lieutenants Place and Cameron were the Commanding Officers of two of His Majesty's Midget Submarines X 7 and X 6 which on 22nd September 1943 carried out a most daring and successful attack on the German Battleship Tirpitz, moored in the protected anchorage of Kaafiord, North Norway.

To reach the anchorage necessitated the penetration of an enemy minefield and a passage of fifty miles up the fiord, known to be vigilantly patrolled by the enemy and to be guarded by nets, gun defences and listening posts, this after a passage of at least a thousand miles from base.

Having successfully eluded all these hazards and entered the fleet anchorage, Lieutenants Place and Cameron, with a complete disregard for danger, worked their small craft past the close anti-submarine and torpedo nets surrounding the Tirpitz, and from a position inside these nets, carried out a cool and determined attack.

Whilst they were still inside the nets a fierce enemy counter attack by guns and depth charges developed which made their withdrawal impossible. Lieutenants Place and Cameron therefore scuttled their craft to prevent them falling into the hands of the enemy. Before doing so they took every measure to ensure the safety of their crews, the majority of whom, together with themselves, were subsequently taken prisoner.

In the course of the operation these very small craft pressed home their attack to the full, in doing so accepting all the dangers inherent in such vessels and facing every possible hazard which ingenuity could devise for the protection in harbour of vitally important Capital Ships.

The courage, endurance and utter contempt for danger in the immediate face of the enemy shown by Lieutenants Place and Cameron during this determined and successful attack were supreme.

He assumed command of HMS Tiptoe (P332) in May 1947. After three years, he was posted back to HMS Dolphin, and in 1951 he took charge of the submarine HMS Trump (P333). His final return to HMS Dolphin came in 1955, when he was appointed Commander Submarines and was in charge of the submarine base at Fort Blockhouse. Despite undertaking several further assignments in the Submarine Service after the war, he did not fully recover from the effects of his captivity. His health, which had already been weakened before Operation Source, worsened during his time in prisoner-of-war camps.

During 1954 he acted as a naval advisor to the production of the British World War II film, Above Us the Waves, starring Sir John Mills, which is based on the midget submarine attack.

== Personal life ==
Cameron married WRNS's member Eve Kilpatrick in 1940 and they had four children. Cameron's health deteriorated in the last years of his life and he was eventually admitted to Royal Hospital Haslar, Gosport, where he died on 10 April 1961. He was buried at sea from submarine HMS Thule on 13 April 1961.
