= David Hunter (Royal Marines officer) =

Lieutenant-Colonel David Hunter MC
- Born: 24 November 1919; Stelling Minnis, Kent
- Died: 5 September 2001 (aged 81)
- Military career
- Allegiance: United Kingdom
- Branch: Royal Marines
- Service years: 1937–1967
- Rank: Lieutenant-Colonel
- Unit: Royal Marines
- Commands: 40 Commando
- Conflicts: Second World War: Defence of Calais; Malayan Emergency
- Awards: Military Cross; Mentioned in Despatches

Lieutenant-Colonel David Peter Lafayette Hunter MC (24 November 1919 – 5 September 2001) was a Royal Marines officer who was prisoner of war captive in Colditz Castle during the Second World War. He later served as the commanding officer of 40 Commando, and was a recipient of the Military Cross.

== Early life ==
David Peter Lafayette Hunter was born at Minnis Hall, Stelling Minnis, Kent on 24 November 1919. He was the third son of Major Edgar Lafayette Hunter MC and Dorothy Thompson.

He was educated at Shrewsbury.

== Military career ==
Hunter joined the Royal Marines in 1937 and passed out at Deal, Kent, just before the outbreak of World War II. On 2 Feb 1940 he was made probationary Lieutenant. He was posted to the heavy cruiser HMS Norfolk patrolling waters around Iceland. The Norfolk was bombed whilst at Scapa Flow on 16 March 1940 and sent to the Clyde for repair. Hunter was redeployed to Chatham, where he was selected for the Calais force as part of the BEF.

=== Calais ===
Hunter was part of Captain Darby Courtice's company of 85 Royal Marines which landed at Calais shortly after midnight on 25 May 1940. With one other officer, Lt Hugh Bruce, they were charged with helping French marines to defend the ancient citadel at the centre of the town. There they were attacked by the full might of XIX Panzer Corps and, by early evening, were surrounded and out of ammunition.

Hunter was later mentioned in dispatches for his "courage and devotion to duty" in racing up and down the beach to keep his unit's machine gun supplied with ammunition. They had fought with such vigor that the official German record read, "The enemy gives the impression of being fresh, and seems to have received reinforcements after two days of heavy fighting." Despite their efforts, within two days Calais had been surrendered to the Germans, and the British troops, including Hunter, taken prisoner.

=== Prisoner of war ===
The captured troops were marched through northern France, the Ardennes and Trier to Mainz. From there, they were moved on to Laufen camp in Bavaria, then transferred to Tittmoning. The Royal Marines officers were moved to Marlag und Milag Nord part of Stalag X-B at Sandbostel, where they soon started planning their escape. Bruce, Hunter's fellow Marine officer, was imprisoned with him and, over the winter of 1941–42, the two men became firm friends. With a number of colleagues they conceived, designed and built by hand a masterpiece of British engineering – a 251-yard-long tunnel, complete with rest bay, electric lighting and air flow system, as well as a signalling device to warn of the approach of sentries. Over 100 tons of soil was excavated and concealed under a hut. On 7 April 1942 Hunter, Bruce and 10 other officers made their escape.

After 12 days on the run, Bruce and Hunter were captured near Flensburg, within a few hundred yards of the Danish border. After a brief spell back at Sandbostel, the pair escaped, this time by jumping aboard a prison lorry, but were recaptured at Hamburg railway station by the German police. They were transferred to Stalag VIII-B in Lamsdorf, Silesia, a prison camp for "other ranks". Their stay lasted only a few months. Hunter was found dangling from a window within inches of a snarling guard dog, and two of Hunter's colleagues were also caught escaping. The miscreants were summarily banished to Colditz Castle.

=== Colditz ===
In early August 1942 Bruce and Hunter arrived at Colditz Castle (then prisoner of war camp Oflag IV-C), where fellow persistent escapees were highly engaged in planning more escapes, and Hunter was soon involved in the various projects. The three Royal Marine officers (Capt Courtice, their company commander at Calais, was also at Colditz) had a reputation for bravery and good humour, and Hunter was noted as being particularly outspoken, a persistent nuisance to his captors and equally amusing to his colleagues. He once stole the cap of the German officer who was expounding on the merits of Wagner during a musical evening. Another incident even made the Germans laugh when, late for a roll-call, he called languidly from a castle window to the parade below "I'll come down and join you all in a minute".

In October 1943 Mike Sinclair was caught during the daring Franz Josef escape. Although Sinclair had surrendered, he was shot at close range by a German officer. Hunter, along with many other witnesses, believed his friend to be dead and shouted "German murderers!". He was subsequently sentenced at a court martial to two months in Graudenz military prison. Forty years later, some 30 officers and their wives made a return visit to Colditz, and Hunter was seen by millions of television viewers standing in the courtyard and taking off the Commandant's "Call to Appell" at the top of his voice. Despite the many notable escape attempts from Colditz, Hunter remained in Colditz until release on 16 April 1945.

=== Post war ===
Following release he underwent a brief re-training period. He was appointed temporary captain 25 February 1946. Hunter was appointed officer commanding Royal Marines in Berlin. This was not a sensitive posting, and Hunter was soon returned to Britain.

He was next posted to the aircraft carrier, HMS Illustrious. Detecting a poor level of morale aboard, he and Donald Douglas, a former prisoner of the Japanese, determined to confront the ship's captain and insist on reasonable treatment. On entering the captain's cabin, Hunter declared "Look, Sir, we're here to tell you that we've both been b******d about as PoWs and we're not having any of it in peacetime!". Douglas was aghast, but to his surprise the captain replied, "All right, I hear you. Dismiss!". The ship's captain later confided to them "Lucky for you on the first day we met that I was reading a book on how to deal with ex-PoWs, or your fate might have been different."

Subsequent postings took him to Egypt, Aqaba, Hong Kong and, in 1950, Malaya. He was made Officer in Charge Cameron Highlands Jungle Operation, protecting planters from Communist guerillas during the Malayan Emergency. Not long after arriving, he was asked to take a Mr Justice Brown on a jungle patrol with 45 Commando. Whilst advancing up a hill at Ringlet they encountered six bandits, one of whom threw a grenade at the soldiers whilst they made their escape. In an act he later described as a "mental aberration", Hunter calmly covered the grenade with his hat and held it while his comrades ran to safety. Fortunately the grenade failed to detonate. Later, to Hunter's astonishment, he was awarded the Military Cross for his "vigor, determination and outstanding skill" in conducting operations against the bandits. He was promoted to major on 14 January 1955. In 1956 he became Amphibious Staff officer, 3 Commando Brigade at Suez.

There followed postings to the RN Staff College, Greenwich, and at Amphibious Warfare HQ, London, followed by a six-month Joint Training Course with the US Marines in San Diego. In 1961 his promotion to lieutenant colonel was confirmed. and he took command of 40 Commando until 1963. Based in Singapore, he was frequently employed in Borneo during the confrontation with the Indonesians following the Brunei Revolt of 1962. After a series of staff appointments, Hunter retired from the Royal Marines 3 March 1967.

== Civilian life ==
Hunter married WAAF officer, Barbara Lewis, in Brentford late in 1945. They had two sons.

Following his retirement from the Marines, Hunter and his family emigrated to Freeport, Bahamas. In 1967 Hunter joined the real estate company of McPherson & Brown.

Barbara died in 1971 and, in 1974 Hunter subsequently remarried to Suzanne Twiston-Davies, a journalist with the BBC.

In 1981, he and colleague, Hilary Jones, bought McPherson & Brown, changing its name to Churchill & Jones. In 1997 Hunter led Churchill & Jones into obtaining the franchise for the Northern Bahamas of RE/MAX, the international real estate conglomerate.

David Peter Lafayette Hunter died at the age of 81 on 5 September 2001.
