= Kåfjord, Alta =

Village in Alta Municipality, Norway

Kåfjord, Alta: Kåfjord (Norwegian); Gávvuonna (Northern Sami); Kaavuono (Kven)
- Village
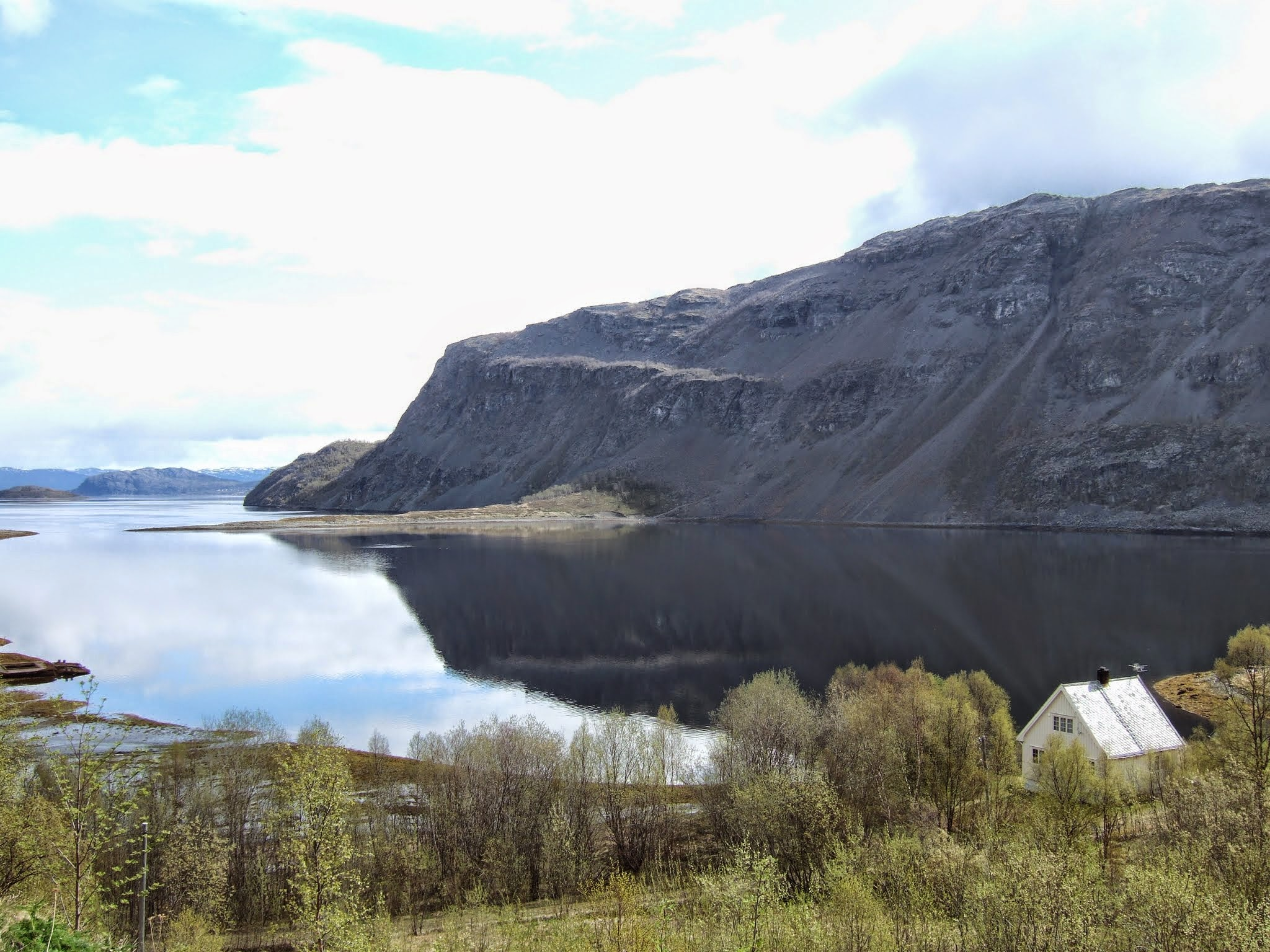
- Interactive map of Kåfjord, Alta
- Location within Finnmark Location within Norway
- Coordinates: 69°56′20″N 23°01′43″E
- Country: Norway
- Region: Northern Norway
- County: Finnmark
- District: Vest-Finnmark
- Municipality: Alta Municipality
- Elevation: 17 m (56 ft)
- Time zone: UTC+01:00 (CET)
  - Summer (DST): UTC+02:00 (CEST)
- Post Code: 9518 Alta

Kåfjord (Norwegian), Gávvuonna (Northern Sami), Kaavuono (Kven) is a village in Alta Municipality in Finnmark county, Norway. The village is located along the Kåfjorden, about 18 kilometres (11 mi) west of the town of Alta along the European route E6 highway. The village of Kvenvik lies about 3 kilometres (1.9 mi) to the east, also along the E6 highway.

At the summit of Mount Haldde, about 9 kilometres (5.6 mi) by a track from Kåfjord, is a restored Northern Lights Observatory, established by Kristian Birkeland in 1899 and operational until 1926, when it was transferred to Tromsø.

== History ==
Copper ore was mined at Kåfjord between 1826 and 1909. A mining company, Alten Copper Mines, was founded by two Englishmen in 1826. By the 1840s, the village had grown to become the largest settlement in Finnmark county, with over 1,000 inhabitants, including Englishmen from Cornwall. The copper works are now closed and derelict.

In 1837, the British built Kåfjord Church, which was restored in 1969.

During the Second World War, the German battleship Tirpitz used Kåfjord as a harbour, and she was damaged there by British aircraft and by Royal Navy midget submarines in Operation Source. Six midget submarines or X-Craft were used but only two successfully laid charges (under the Tirpitz). Crafts X6 and X7, commanded by Lt Donald Cameron and Lt Godfrey Place, respectively, were successful. Tirpitz was badly damaged, crippled, and out of action until May 1944; it was destroyed on 12 November 1944 by Avro Lancaster bombers, during Operation Catechism in Tromsø, Norway.

The Tirpitz Museum in the village is devoted to the Tirpitz.

== Notable Person ==
Notable people that were born or lived in Kåfjord include:

- Henry Woodfall Crowe (1832–1865), British-Norwegian interpreter, translator, and author
