= Marlag und Milag Nord =

WWII German prisoner-of-war camp complex

- Westertimke, Lower Saxony

Site information
- Type: Prisoner-of-war camp
- Controlled by: Nazi Germany

Location
- Westertimke, Germany (pre-war borders, 1937)
- Location within Germany
- Coordinates: 53.230162°N 9.126327°E

Site history
- In use: 1942–1945
- Battles/wars: World War II

Garrison information
- Occupants: Mostly British Merchant Navy and Royal Navy personnel

Marlag und Milag Nord was a Second World War German prisoner-of-war camp complex for men of the British and Canadian Merchant Navy and Royal Navy. It was located around the village of Westertimke, about 30 km (19 mi) north-east of Bremen, though in some sources the camp's location is given as Tarmstedt, a larger village about 4 km (2.5 mi) to the west. There were also American merchant seamen detained here as well as some U.S. Navy personnel.

== Status of merchant seamen ==
Of more than 5,000 Allied merchant seamen captured by the Germans during the war, most were held at Marlag-Milag. As civilian non-combatants, according to Section XI, Article 6, of the 1907 Hague Conventions, merchant seamen "...are not made prisoners of war, on condition that they make a formal promise in writing, not to undertake, while hostilities last, any service connected with the operations of the war." The Germans, however, always treated Merchant Navy seamen as POWs (as did the British from 1942). In 1943 the Germans suggested an exchange of equal numbers of Merchant Navy prisoners, but this offer was refused by the First Lord of the Admiralty A. V. Alexander on the grounds it would be more to Germany's benefit, as it would provide them with a large number of men suitable to be used as U-boat crews, of which they were desperately short.

== Camp history ==
=== Stalag X-B ===
Initially, prisoners from the Merchant and Royal Navy were confined in several camps in Northern Germany. In April 1941 they were gathered together at Stalag X-B at Sandbostel and housed in two compounds designated "Ilag X-B" (German: Internierungslager, lit. 'Internment camp') and "Marlag X-B" (Marinelager, lit. 'Navy camp'). At the instigation of the U.S. and Swiss governments, the International Committee of the Red Cross put pressure on the German government not to keep civilian non-combatants in a POW camp. The Germans complied, selecting what was originally a small Luftwaffe training camp consisting of six barracks and a small airfield at Westertimke. In July 1941 the prisoners of Ilag X-B were set to work dismantling their barrack huts at Sandbostel, then rebuilding them at Westertimke, finally completing the Milag camp in February 1942. Marlag camp was not completed until July 1942.

=== Marlag and Milag Nord ===
Marlag, the Royal Navy camp, was divided into two compounds; "O" housed officers and their orderlies, while "M" held petty officers and ratings. The majority of prisoners were British, but there were also small numbers of other Allied nationalities. In late 1942 all the ratings were sent to Stalag VIII-B at Lamsdorf and assigned to Arbeitskommando (lit. 'Work details'), and "M" housed only NCOs.

Milag (Marineinterniertenlager, lit. 'marine internment camp'), the Merchant Navy camp, was 300 m (980 ft) to the east of Marlag. This also divided into two separate compounds for officers and men. The area in between contained the guard house, a prison block, fuel bunker, and the camp hospital.

Just outside the gates of Milag was the Kommandantur (lit. 'headquarters') and accommodation for the guards. In between the camps there was a large shower block which was used by men of both camps.

Each camp contained a number of single-story wooden huts; 29 in Marlag and 36 in Milag. Most of them were barracks, while the others contained kitchens, dining rooms, washrooms, guard barracks, storehouses, a post office and other administrative buildings. The barracks were divided into rooms each accommodating 14 to 18 men who slept in two and three-tiered bunks.

The POWs occupied themselves in various ways. There was a camp theatre in Marlag and the POWs performed concerts and plays. Each camp had its own sports field and there was also a library with around 3,000 books. Prisoners ran courses in languages and mathematics, as well as commercial, vocational, economic and scientific subjects. Sports equipment and textbooks were obtained from the Red Cross and YMCA. POWs were allowed to send two letters and four postcards each month. There were no restrictions on the number of letters a POW could receive. Naturally all incoming and outgoing mail was censored. A popular diversion was provided by the "Milag Jockey Club" which held race meetings every Saturday evening. The "horses" were wooden models that raced on a 36-foot (11 m) track, controlled by dice. The POW bet on the races, and money was raised and donated to the Red Cross.

Under normal conditions the camps had a capacity of 5,300. According to official figures in April 1944 there were 4,268 men held there. Initially the camp was guarded by Naval troops. Later they were replaced by Army reservists.

=== Other camps ===
The German navy also operated a Dulag (Durchgangslager, lit. 'transit camp') in Wilhelmshaven, where newly arrived prisoners were processed before being sent to other camps. After the Allied bombing raids on Wilhelmshaven in February 1942 this facility was moved to Westertimke. The camp Dulag Nord was located between Marlag and Milag.

In September 1943, 630 merchant seamen from India, China, Burma and Aden were moved out of the Milag into a new camp, Milag (Inder) (known as the Inderlager, lit. ' Indian camp') west of Westertimke. To the north and east of the village three smaller camps were also built. The Kommandatur contained the headquarters and administration buildings, while the Stabslager and the Wache contained accommodation for the administrative personnel and the camp guards.

=== Liberation ===
At the end of 1944 prisoners evacuated from other camps began to arrive, resulting in overcrowding, and a reduction in food rations. On 4 February 1945 some 3,000 men evacuated from Stalag Luft III arrived at Marlag-Milag. In order to accommodate them the entire population of Marlag "M" was moved into "O".

On 2 April 1945 the Commandant announced that he had received orders to leave the camp with most of his guards, leaving only a small detachment behind to hand over the camp to Allied forces, who were already in Bremen. However that afternoon a detachment of over a hundred SS-Feldgendarmerie entered the camp, mustered over 3,000 men and marched them out, heading east. The next day, at around at 10:00 a.m., the column was strafed by RAF aircraft, and several POWs were killed. Over the next few days the column was attacked from the air several times. Finally the Senior British Naval Officer offered the Germans the POWs parole, in return for being allowed to rest during the day and march at night. The Germans agreed.

On 9 April 1945 the guards at Milag-Marlag moved out and were replaced by older men, presumably local Volkssturm. Meanwhile, the column slowly headed east, finally crossing the River Elbe, north of Hamburg, on 18 April.

On 19 April units of the 15th Panzergrenadier Division positioned tanks and artillery next to the camps. The remaining prisoners responded to the threat of a pitched battle on their doorstep by digging slit trenches. The artillery fired from the positions next to the camps, but fortunately had moved away by the time the British Guards Armoured Division liberated the camps on 27 April 1945.

The next day, 28 April, the column finally arrived at Lübeck on the Baltic coast. They were liberated by the British 11th Armoured Division on 1 May 1945.

=== Post-war use ===
After the German surrender Marlag-Milag was used by the British occupation authorities to house German prisoners-of-war. Marlag "O" was designated "Civil Internment Camp No. 9" and housed high-ranking party officials and suspected war criminals. In 1946 Marlag "M" was used as a location to film Basil Dearden's POW drama The Captive Heart.

Between 1952 and 1961 Milag was used as accommodation centre for female refugees from East Germany. The northern part of Milag was eventually built over with new housing, while the southern half is now heavily wooded.

The Bundeswehr took over the site of Marlag, and from March 1963 as the Timke-Kaserne (lit. 'Timke barracks') it was the headquarters of the Flugabwehrraketenbataillon 31 (lit. '31st Anti-aircraft Missile Battalion') of the 4th Luftwaffe Division, operating the MIM-23 Hawk surface-to-air missile. The division left the site in 1993, since when it has been redeveloped as a business park.

== Escapes ==
Several escape tunnels were dug from Milag. The first was about 12 m (40 ft) long, built from March to August 1943. Twelve prisoners escaped, though all were recaptured within two weeks. A second tunnel, about 40 m (130 ft) long, was built from April to August 1944. Five men escaped, but again were soon recaptured. Another tunnel built by Norwegian prisoners was discovered before its completion. In addition, another tunnel was dug to store contraband.

Two officers; Lieutenant Denis Kelleher RNVR, and Lieutenant Stewart Campbell, FAA, escaped from Marlag in early 1944, wearing blue overalls to cover their uniforms, and managed to reach Britain within 22 days, having been smuggled to neutral Sweden on a ship from Bremen.

Another successful escaper from Marlag was Lieutenant David James, RNVR. In December 1943 James slipped out of the shower block, but was arrested at the port of Lübeck. In late 1944 he escaped again and this time made it to Sweden.

== Notable prisoners ==
- Lieutenant David Hunter RM, captured at Calais in May 1940, he twice escaped from Marlag X-B at Sandbostel, and ended the war at Colditz.
- Lieutenant Ivan Ewart RNVR, captured in January 1942 after his MTB was sunk off Boulogne. After two escape attempts from Milag-Marlag, he was transferred to Colditz.
- Captain Micky Burn, No. 2 Commando, captured in March 1942 after the St Nazaire Raid.
- Able Seaman Bjørn Egge, later a major general of the Norwegian Army, captured in April 1942 after an attempt by Norwegian merchant vessels at Gothenburg, Sweden, to reach Britain. ("Operation Performance").
- Lieutenants Donald Cameron RNR, and Godfrey Place RN, commanders of the X class submarines X-6 and X-7, captured in September 1943 after the attack on the Tirpitz.
- Lieutenant John Worsley RN, captured in November 1943 during a landing on Lussinpiccolo. Also an official war artist, Worsley painted several portraits of his fellow POWs, and made sketches of the camp, as well as creating "Albert R.N." a life-sized dummy, that ensured that any escaper would not be missed in the daily head-counts.
- Captain Peter J. Ortiz USMC, serving with the OSS, he was captured in France in August 1944.
- 2nd Lieutenant Walter W. Taylor USMCR, another member of the OSS, also captured in France in August 1944.
- SS-Hauptsturmführer Alexander Piorkowski, Commandant of Dachau concentration camp, 1939-42, held by the British in 1945.
- Kenji Takaki, merchant sailor, a naturalized British subject born in Japan. Became a theatrical and film actor following the war.
- Victor George Marks, 1941-1945, Engineer on the Triadic, captured December 1940 off Nauru. Captained Australia in a series of cricket "tests" held at the camp.
- Pat Landy, ML306, Royal Australian Navy.
- Leslie McDermott-Brown (1925-1993), a merchant marine cadet, was the UK's youngest POW in 1940, captured age 15 after his ship the SS Kemmendine, which had sailed from the Clyde, was sunk by the German surface raider Atlantis in the Bay of Biscay. Leslie spent the next five years in captivity in Germany, aged 15-20, finally being liberated from Milag Nord in 1945. Despite this set-back in life, Leslie went on to be a managing director of hotel company in Plymouth Devon during the 1950s to 1980s and is survived by his three sons.

== See also ==
- Laws of war
- List of prisoner-of-war camps in Germany
- The March (1945)
