= Operation Source =

Second World War Royal Navy midget submarine attacks on heavy German warships in Norway

- Part of World War II
- Tirpitz c. 1941
| Date | 20–22 September 1943 |
| Location | Altafjord, Norway |
| Result | Allied partial success |

Belligerents
| United Kingdom; Norway; Australia | Germany |

Commanders and leaders
| Claud Barry; Donald Cameron (POW); Godfrey Place (POW); Henty Henty-Creer † | Hans Meyer |

Strength
| 6 midget submarines 6 conventional submarines | Battleship Tirpitz; Heavy cruiser Lützow |

Casualties and losses
| 6 midget submarines sunk; 9 killed; 6 captured | Tirpitz damaged |

Operation Source was a series of attacks to neutralise the heavy German warships – Tirpitz, Scharnhorst, and Lützow – based in northern Norway, using X-class midget submarines.

The attacks took place in September 1943 at Kåfjord and succeeded in keeping Tirpitz out of action for at least six months.

== Background ==
On September 12, 1943, in conditions of low clouds and rain, Soviet pilot Leonid Elkin found the Tirpitz anchorage in Altenfjord, descended under the edge of the clouds and passed above it three times under heavy anti-aircraft fire at an altitude of 50 meters, achieving high-quality photography of the target. The resulting photographs were immediately transferred to the British Admiralty, which, based on them, prepared a new operation.

The concept for the attack was developed by Commander Cromwell-Varley, with support of Max Horton, Flag Officer Submarines, and Prime Minister Winston Churchill.

The operation was directed from Royal Navy shore establishment HMS Varbel, located in Port Bannatyne on the Isle of Bute. Varbel (named after Commanders Varley and Bell, designers of the X-Craft prototype) was the headquarters for the 12th Submarine Flotilla (midget submarines). It had been the Kyles Hydropathic Hotel, a luxury 88-bedroom hotel, and had been requisitioned by the Admiralty to serve as the flotilla's headquarters. All X-craft training and preparation for X-craft attacks was co-ordinated from Varbel.

Intelligence contributing to the attack on Tirpitz was collected and sent to the Royal Navy by the Norwegian resistance, especially brothers Torbjørn Johansen and Einar Johansen.

== Attack ==
Six X-craft were used. X5, X6 and X7 were allocated the battleship Tirpitz, in Kåfjord. X9 and X10 were to attack the battleship Scharnhorst, also in Kåfjord. X8 was to attack the heavy cruiser Lützow in Langfjord. The submersibles were towed to the area by conventional submarines (HMS Truculent (X6) Syrtis (X9), Sea Nymph (X8), Thrasher (X5), Stubborn (X7), and Sceptre (X10)) and manned by passage crews on the way. Close to the target, the operation crews would take over.

X9, probably trimmed heavily by the bow in the heavy sea for the tow, was lost with all three crew on the passage when her tow parted and she suffered an abrupt plunge due to her bow-down trim. (Note: The passage crew were Harry Harte, Able Seaman, George Hollett, Stoker and Irishman, Edward Kearon, Sub-Lieutenant)X8 (passage crew commanded by Lieutenant Jack Smart) developed serious leaks in her side-mounted demolition charges, which had to be jettisoned; these exploded, leaving her so damaged she had to be scuttled.

The remaining X-craft began their run in on 20 September, and the attacks took place on 22 September 1943 starting at 7:00 pm (1900 hours) that evening. Scharnhorst was engaged in exercises at the time, and hence was not at her normal mooring, X10's attack was abandoned due to mechanical and navigation problems, and the submarine returned to rendezvous with her 'tug' submarine. X10 was scuttled on the way back to Scotland when the tow rope broke.

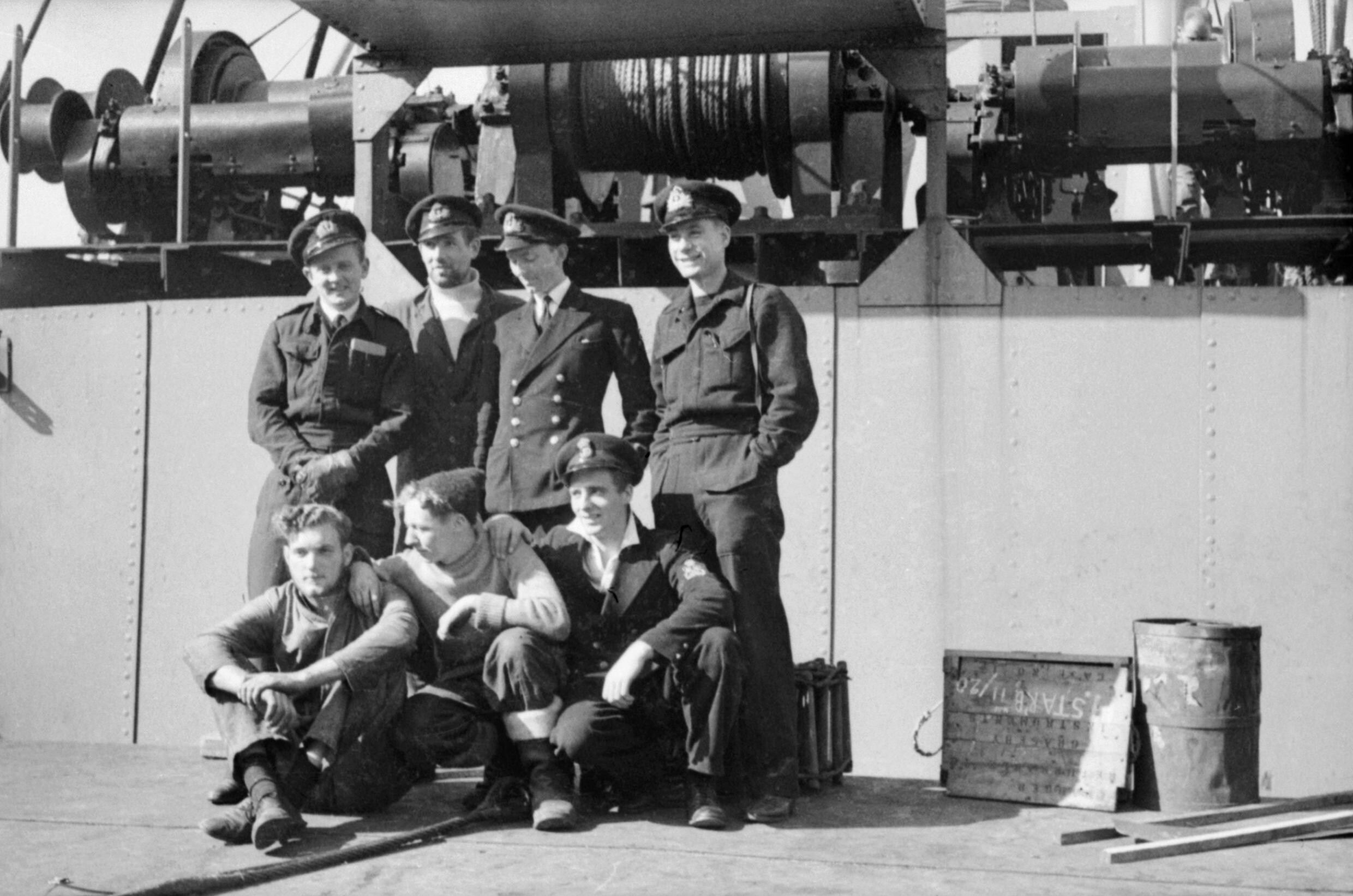
Lt. Henty-Creer and the crew of X5

X5, commanded by Lieutenant Henty-Creer, disappeared with her crew during Source. She is believed to have been sunk by a direct hit from one of Tirpitz's 105-millimetre (4.1 in) guns before placing demolition charges. There was a possibility X5 had also successfully planted side charges before being destroyed, but this was never conclusively proven. An expedition jointly run by the late Carl Spencer (Britannic 2003), Bill Smith (Bluebird Project) and the Royal Navy using the mine hunters HMS Quorn and HMS Blyth in 2006 mapped the north and south anchorages used by Tirpitz and proved the charge was well inside the net enclosure of the north anchorage and therefore most likely from X6.

X6 and X7 managed to drop their charges under Tirpitz, but were unable to escape as they were observed and attacked. Both were abandoned and six crewmen captured. Upon capture, the crewmen informed the German captain Hans Meyer that there would be explosions under Tirpitz within an hour. Meyer quickly attempted to move the ship away from the charges, but was unable to do so before the charges exploded.

== Aftermath ==
Tirpitz was heavily damaged. While not in danger of sinking, she took on over 1,400 tons of water and suffered significant mechanical damage. The first mine exploded abreast of turret Caesar, and the second mine detonated 45 to 55 m (148 to 180 ft) off the port bow. A fuel oil tank was ruptured, shell plating was torn, a large indentation was made in the bottom of the ship, and bulkheads in the double bottom buckled. Some 1,430 t (1,410 long tons) of water flooded the ship in fuel tanks and void spaces in the double bottom of the port side, which caused a list of one to two degrees, which was balanced by counter-flooding on the starboard side. The flooding damaged all of the turbo-generators in generator room No. 2, and all apart from one generator in generator room No. 1 were disabled by broken steam lines or severed power cables. Turret Dora was thrown from its bearings and could not be rotated; this was particularly significant, as there were no heavy-lift cranes in Norway powerful enough to lift the turret and place it back on its bearings. The ship's two Arado Ar 196 floatplanes were thrown by the explosive concussion and completely destroyed.

Repairs were conducted by the repair ship Neumark; historians William Garzke and Robert Dulin remarked that the successful repair effort was "one of the most notable feats of naval engineering during the Second World War." Repairs lasted until 2 April 1944; full-speed trials were scheduled for the following day in Altafjord.

Just after repairs concluded, Tirpitz was damaged by British carrier-launched dive bombers in Operation Tungsten on 3 April 1944.

On 12 November 1944, the ship was sunk by Avro Lancaster bombers in Operation Catechism.

== X-craft and crews ==
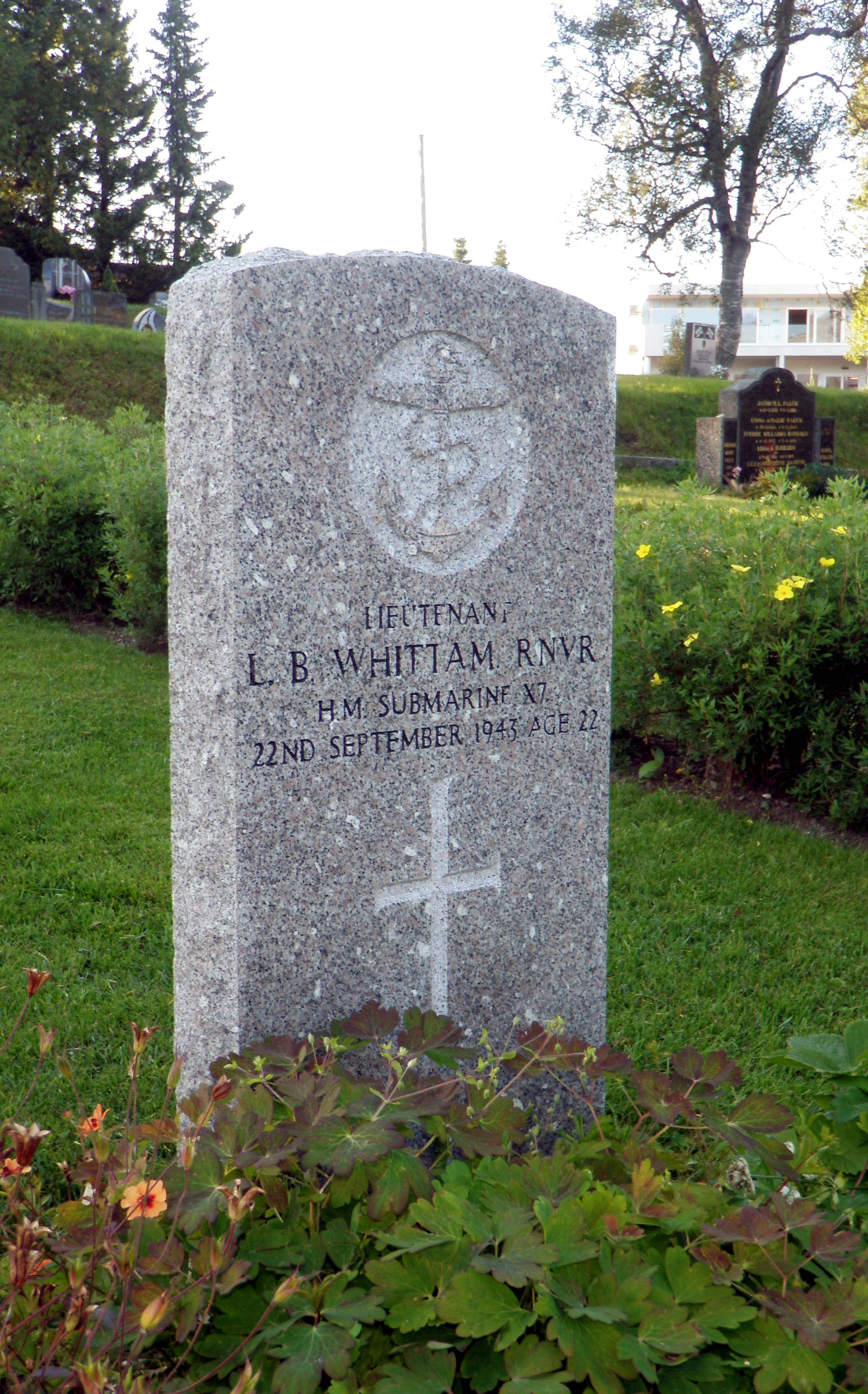
The grave of Lieutenant Lionel Barnett Whittam at the Commonwealth War Graves section of Tromsø's main cemetery

- X-5: Unofficially named Platypus, Passage crew Lt Terry-Lloyd, L. Seaman Element and Stoker (1st Class) Garrity, operational crew Lt Henty-Creer, Sub-Lt Malcolm, Sub-Lt Nelson and ER Artificer (Engine Room Artificer, i.e. engineer) Mortiboys. Henty-Creer, Nelson, Malcolm, and Mortiboys were killed in the attack, though X-5's exact fate is unknown.
- X-6: Named Piker II, Passage crew Lt Wilson, L. Seaman McGregor and Stoker (1st Class) Oakley, operational crew Lt Donald Cameron, Sub-Lt Lorimer, Sub-Lt Kendall and ER Artificer Goddard. Cameron earned a Victoria Cross (VC), Lorimer and Kendall the Distinguished Service Order (DSO), Goddard a Conspicuous Gallantry Medal (CGM).
- X-7: Unofficially named Pdinichthys, Passage crew Lt Philip, Able Seaman James Joseph Magennis and Stoker (1st Class) Luck, operational crew Lt Godfrey Place, Sub-Lt Whittam, Sub-Lt Aitken and ER Artificer Whitley. Place also earned a VC, Aitken the DSO, while Philip was appointed a Member of the Order of the British Empire (MBE); Whittam and Whitley were killed as they were unable to exit the craft when it sank.. After the attack, the stern section of X-7 was recovered for study by the Germans. The bow and battery section were re-discovered in 1974 by a diving club searching for the wreckage of X-5, and salvaged in 1976. The wreckage is currently preserved and on display at the Imperial War Museum, London
- X-8: Passage crew Lt Smart, L. Seaman Pomeroy and Stoker (1st Class) Robinson, operational crew Lt McFarlane, Lt Marsden, Sub-Lt Hindmarsh and ER Artificer Murray. X-8 was scuttled on 18 September 1943, after being verified she could now serve no useful purpose in the operation due to water leaking into the side charges.
- X-9: Passage crew Sub-Lt Edward Kearon, Able Seaman Harry Harte and Stoker George Hollett, operational crew Lt Martin, Sub-Lt Brooks, Lt Shean and ER Artificer Coles. Kearon, Harte and Hollet died when it foundered on 16 September 1943 after the tow rope parted.
- X-10: Unofficially named Excalibur. Passage crew Sub-Lt Page, Petty Officer Brookes and ER Artificer Fishleigh, operational crew Lt Hudspeth, Sub-Lt Enzer, Sub-Lt Harding and ER Artificer Tilley. X-10 was scuttled on 23 September 1943 (after rendezvousing with her parent submarine and recovering the crew), because the chances of her being able to be towed home in a heavy gale were very slight.

For this action, the commanders of the craft, Lieutenants Donald Cameron (X6) and Basil Place (X7), were awarded the Victoria Cross, whilst Robert Aitken, Richard Haddon Kendall, and John Thornton Lorimer received the Distinguished Service Order and Edmund Goddard the Conspicuous Gallantry Medal. The commander of X8, John Elliott Smart, was appointed a Member of the Order of the British Empire (MBE). Henty-Creer of X5 was not decorated, but was mentioned in dispatches.

== In popular culture ==
- The operation was later portrayed in the 1955 war film Above Us the Waves, featuring John Mills, which was based on both Operation "Source" and the earlier Operation Title human torpedo attack on Tirpitz.
- The 1969 war film Submarine X-1 is loosely based on Operation "Source".
- A facsimile of the operation is featured in the 2003 video game Hidden & Dangerous 2 as a campaign mission.

== See also ==
- XE-class submarine
- Operation Struggle, another midget submarine attack
