= Tirpitz Museum (Norway) =

War museum in Norway

Coordinates: 69.9315°N 23.0150°E

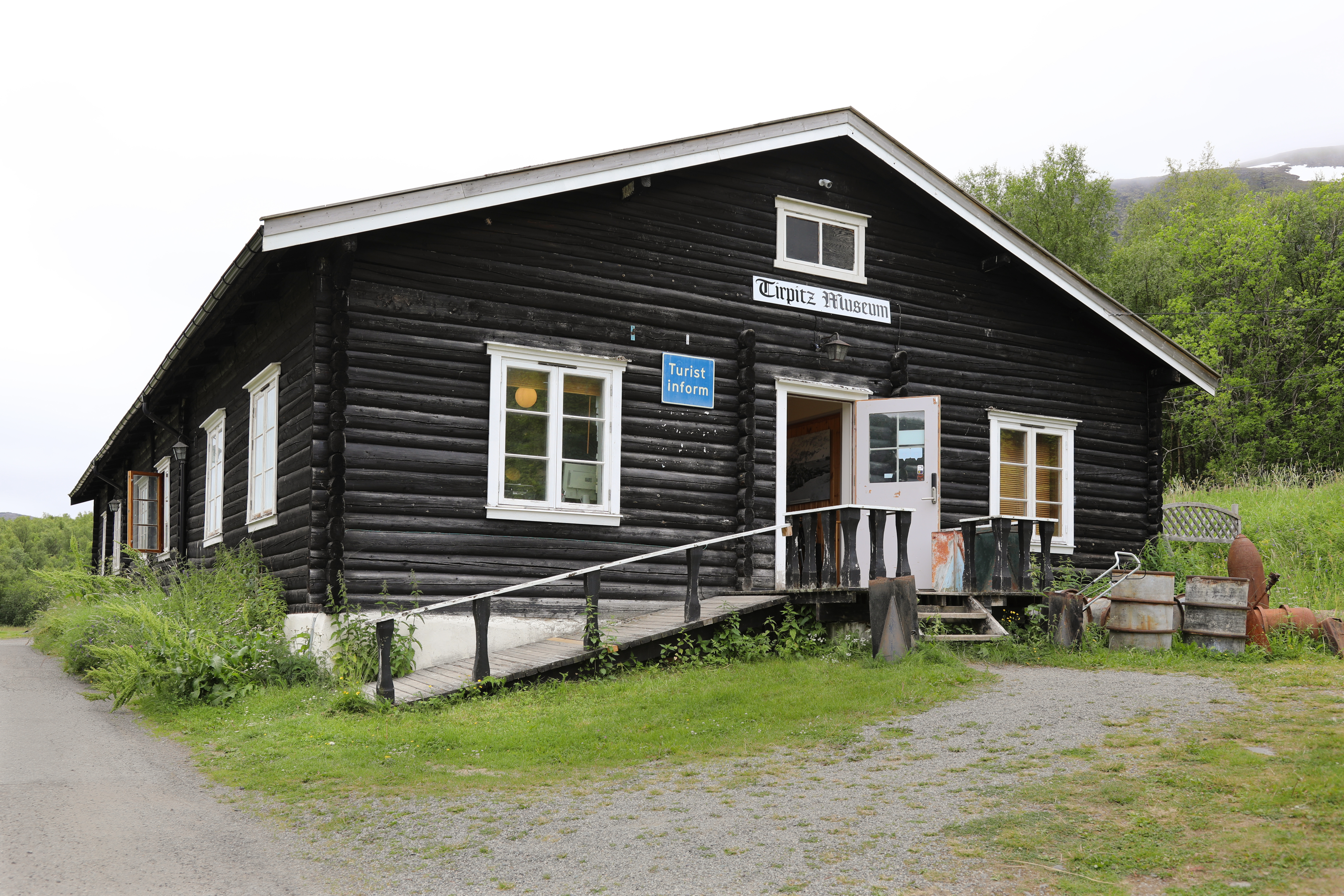
Tirpitz Museum (Norway)

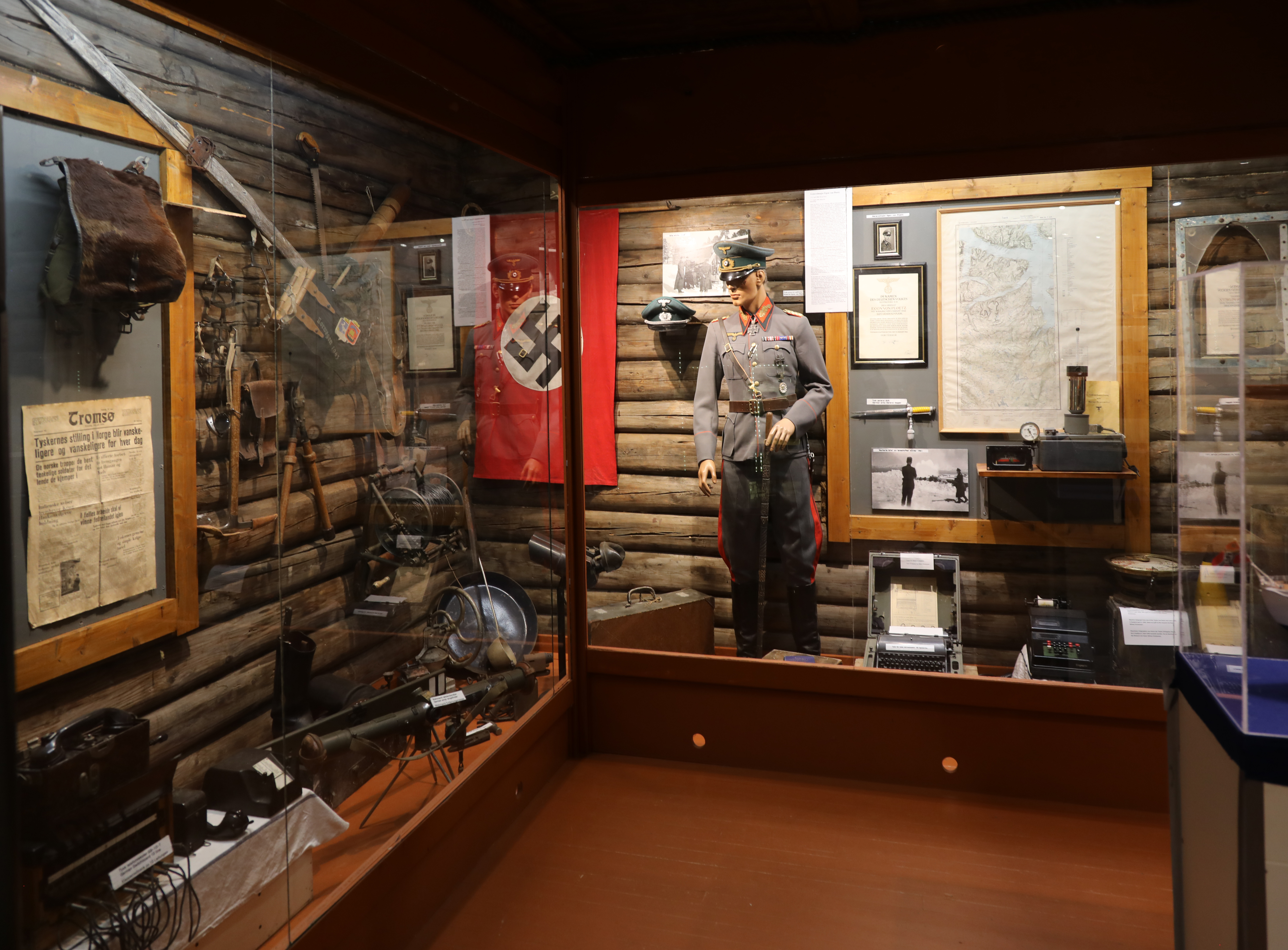
Part of the museum's exhibition

Tirpitz Museum is a war museum that is located in the village of Kåfjord in Alta Municipality in Finnmark county, Norway.

== History ==
The museum has one of the largest collections of photos and artifacts from the battleship Tirpitz, a Bismarck-class battleship built for the German Kriegsmarine during World War II. The battleship Tirpitz had served as one of the main threats against supply convoys sailing to Murmansk. During the occupation of Norway by Nazi Germany, a German naval base was established in the Altafjord to prevent convoys from the Western Allies from delivering supplies to the Soviet Union. These supplies were deemed critical to the outcome of the war on the Eastern Front.

The Alta area was one of Germany's largest naval bases during the war. Tirpitz, which was one of the world's largest and most powerful battleships, was anchored for nearly two years in Kåfjord. Altafjord was also a base for many other German warships, among them the battleship Scharnhorst and the heavy cruiser Lützow, as well as dozens of German destroyers and supply ships. On 12 November 1944, Tirpitz was hit by bombs and capsized in the bay outside Tromsø.

The timber building that the Tirpitz Museum is located in dates from approximately 1880. It was originally built in Lillehammer. It was taken down and sent to Alta in 1946 as part of the effort to help rebuild the war-ravaged region. Initially the building served as the first nursing home in Finnmark. It remained in use until the new nursing home in Kåfjord was built in 1961.

== See also ==
- List of Allied attacks on the German battleship Tirpitz

== Other sources ==
- Brown, David (1977) Tirpitz: the floating fortress (Naval Institute Press) ISBN 978-0-85368-341-4
- Kennedy, Ludovic Henry Coverley (1979) The death of the Tirpitz (Little Brown) ISBN 978-0-316-48905-8
- Peillard, Leonce (1983) Sink the Tirpitz! ( Academy Chicago Publishers) ISBN 978-0-583-12384-6
- Sweetman, John (2004) Tirpitz: Hunting the Beast (Gloucestershire: Sutton Publishing Limited) ISBN 0-7509-3755-6
- Zetterling, Niklas; Tamelander, Michael (2009) Tirpitz: The Life and Death of Germany's Last Super Battleship (Havertown, PA: Casemate) ISBN 978-1-935149-18-7.
