= Hans Karl Meyer =

German naval officer (1898–1989)

- Hans Meyer during his navy career
- Born: 1 December 1898; Stolzenhagen, German Empire
- Died: 23 January 1989 (aged 90); Hamburg, West Germany
- Military career
- Allegiance: Germany; West Germany
- Branch: Kriegsmarine; German Navy
- Service years: 1919–1945; 1957–1975
- Rank: Flotilla admiral
- Commands: Köln; Tirpitz
- Conflicts: World War II

Hans Karl Meyer (1 December 1898 – 23 January 1989), was a German naval officer and Konteradmiral in the Kriegsmarine during World War II and later Flotilla admiral of the German Navy. Meyer was most notable for being commander of the battleship Tirpitz, of 1/Seekriegsleitung (SKL) Operations of Naval Command and being one of six Kriegsmarine admirals who were subordinated after World War II in the new German Navy.

== Life ==
On 2 January 1917, during World War I, Meyer volunteered for the Imperial German Navy, with the prospect of naval officer career. Meyer completed his basic education and training on the cruiser SMS Freya, before being transferred to the Battlecruiser, SMS Seydlitz in June 1917, where he was subordinated until the end of the war. His accomplishments were honoured by the award of the Iron Cross 2nd Class and the Wound Badge in Black. On 16 November 1917, Meyer was promoted to Fähnrich zur See.

After the end of World War I, Meyer was initially made available for training by the Imperial German Navy and from mid-December 1918 to early February 1919 was posted on leave. He initially joined the Freikorps until the end of May 1919 and was then again posted on leave. On 10 September 1919, Meyer was subordinated to the III. Naval Brigade under Corvette Captain Wilfried von Loewenfeld and participated in fighting in the Ruhr area. Due to a severe wound, he lost his left arm.

Meyer was subordinated for a few months to the Ships Cadre Detachment of the Baltic Sea, and again was promoted on 20 July 1920 to Leutnant zur See and transferred on 24 October 1920 as Ordonnanzoffizier to the staff of the Naval Station of the Baltic Sea. From 30 June 1921 onwards Meyer was posted as Watch-Officer, Wachoffizier with the 2nd Torpedo-Boat-Half-Flotilla in Swinemünde. On 1 April 1923, Meyer received a promotion to Oberleutnant zur See. From 29 December 1924 to 5 January 1925, Meyer was posted to the SMS Hessen as part of the Ships Cadre. During his time there Meyer served as an Adjutant and radio officer, undergoing continuous training including takfoing several training trips, to Spain, Canary Islands and Portugal. On 1 October 1928, Meyer was transferred to the 1st Torpedo Boat Half-Flotilla, where he subsequently commanded Torpedo Boats G 10 and T 185. On 1 January 1930, Meyer was promoted to Kapitänleutnant.

The battleship Tirpitz, which Meyer commanded for a period in 1943

From 29 September 1930 to 29 September 1933 Meyer was an Advisor to the Torpedo and Mining Inspectorate in Kiel and then completed his Führergehilfenausbildung at the Naval Academy. After successful training, Meyer was appointed the director of the 2nd Torpedo Boat Flotilla and promoted on 1 October 1935 to Korvettenkapitän. From 15 July 1937, he served for two years as a military teacher at the Naval Academy and was then transferred as the 1st Admiralstabsoffizier in the staff of the Marine Group Command West. In this function Meyer was promoted on 1 August 1939 to Fregattenkapitän and on 1 February 1941 to Kapitän zur See. In the course of the World War II on 6 June 1941 Chief of Staff of the Naval Group Command West. On 13 December 1942 he took over as commander of the light cruiser Köln. After a submarine attack, the ship had to be decommissioned for repairs, and Meyer then gave up his command and was subsequently appointed on 25 February 1943 to command of the battleship Tirpitz. From 1 May 1944, he was briefly available to the Naval Command of the Baltic Sea and the Seekriegsleitung, later being promoted to Konteradmiral on 1 June 1944 and appointed on 29 June 1944 to Chief of Operations Division of the Naval Warfare Command of the Oberkommando der Marine. Meyer held this post beyond the end of the war until July 22, 1945 and was subsequently taken prisoner of war, from which he was released on 24 February 1946.

After being released Meyer worked in a hotel for a number of years.

Meyer was one of the six naval Admirals who were transferred to the German Navy. On 16 April 1957, he served as Flotilla admiral in the Federal Ministry of Defence, where he was commanded to instruct the Naval Department from September 1957. It was followed by a one-year period as commander of the Naval Academy. After its integration into the Military Academy of the German Armed Forces in Hamburg.

Meyer later worked from 21 October 1966 until 31 March 1975 as deputy Federal Commissioner for the Services.
