= Stalag X-B =

World War II German prisoner-of-war camp in Lower Saxony, Germany

- Sandbostel
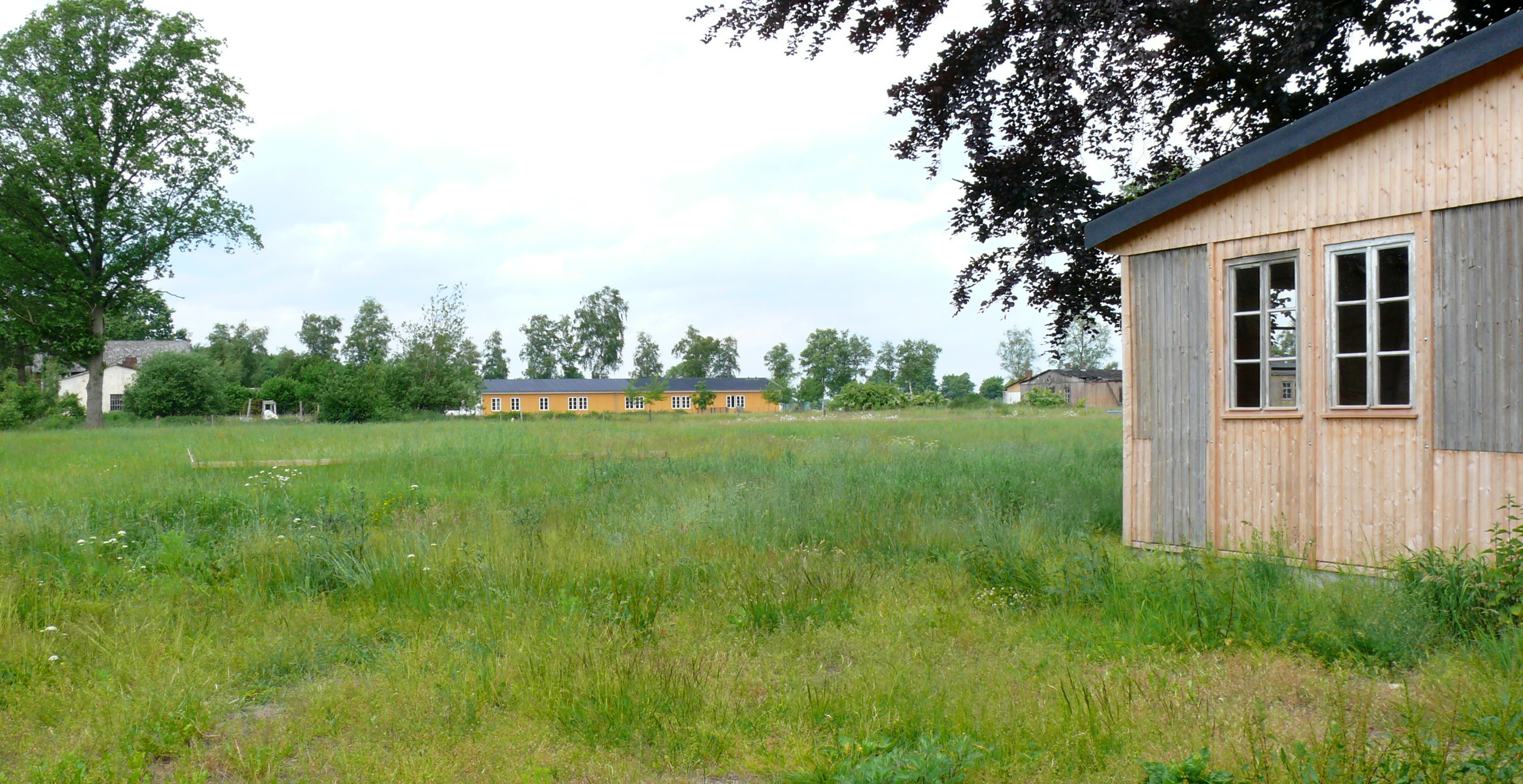
- Camp huts housing the exhibition, 2013

Site information
- Type: Prisoner-of-war camp
- Owner: Stiftung Lager Sandbostel
- Controlled by: Nazi Germany
- Open to the public: yes

Location
- Location within Germany
- Coordinates: 53.399642°N 9.109811°E

Site history
- In use: (as POW camp) 1939–1945
- Demolished: 1945
- Battles/wars: World War II

Garrison information
- Occupants: Polish, Belgian, French, Soviet, British, Italian, Serbian, American and other Allied POWs

Stalag X-B was a World War II German prisoner-of-war camp located near Sandbostel in Lower Saxony in north-western Germany. Between 1939 and 1945 over 300,000 POWs of 55 nations passed through the camp. Due to the bad conditions in which they were housed, thousands died there of hunger, disease, or were killed by the guards. Estimates of the number of dead range from 8,000 to 50,000.

== Establishment and operation ==
Sandbostel lies 9 km south of Bremervörde, 43 km northeast of Bremen. In what was then the Province of Hanover, the camp was opened by the Arbeitsdienst Niedersachsen e. V. in November 1932. One year later, in May 1933, the Arbeitsdienst der NSDAP took over the camp, and in June 1935, it was transferred to the Reichsarbeitsdienst.

In August 1939, a commission of Heeresbauamt Bremen (military construction department) decided to create a Mannschafts-Stammlager (POW camp) for the local Wehrkreis X. In September, construction of the camp began between the village of Sandbostel and the Arbeitsdienstlager in the Teufelsmoor. The latter area was now used as barracks to house the Wehrmacht guards.

Beginning in September 1939, Polish POWs were used to expand the camp. Initially, huts for around 10,000 prisoners were built. Once it began operating, the camp was divided into several sub-camps:

- a Stalag holding enlisted men from the occupied countries (Poland, Belgium, the Netherlands, France, Southeastern Europe and Italy after the armistice)
- an officers' camp (Oflag) for officers from the occupied countries. In 1941, this part of the camp was merged with Oflags elsewhere
- a Marinelager (Marlag), controlled by the Kriegsmarine, holding British sailors, marines and officers. In the fall of 1941, this part of the camp was moved to Westertimke
- an Internierungslager (Ilag), or internment camp for civilian citizens of enemy nations, including members of the British Merchant Navy. This section was also moved in 1941 to Westertimke (see: Marlag und Milag Nord)

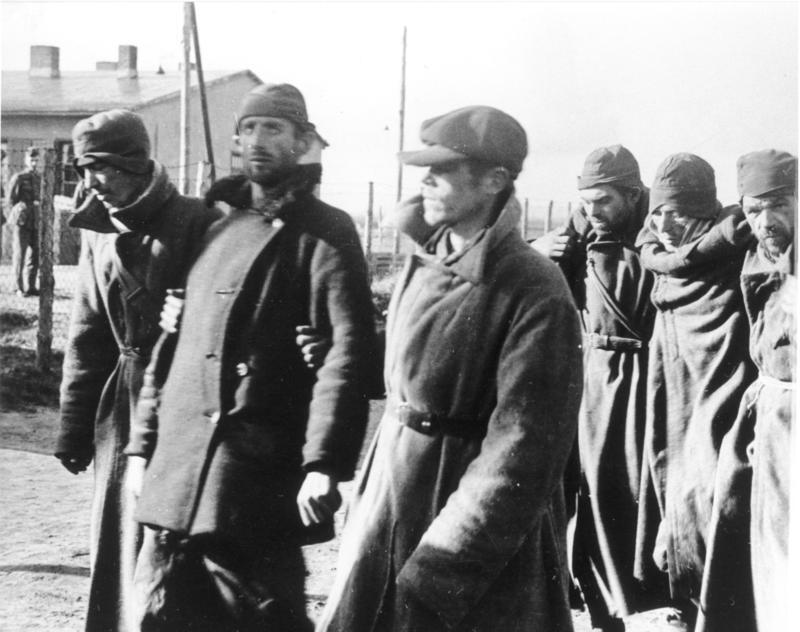
POW's in Sandbostel 1941 - 1943

At first, prisoners were housed in tents, but from spring 1940 inmates constructed masonry huts. Later, prefabricated wooded huts were added. By 1941, there were over 100 huts housing prisoners as well as latrines, kitchens, buildings for punishment confinement and the commandant's office. In addition, there was a hospital (Reservelazarett X-B) and a punishment work camp of two huts inside the moor. By 1940, after the German victory over France, the camp was filled beyond capacity. Stalag X-B was then expanded to house a total of 30,000 prisoners.

From the fall of 1941, sections of the camp were cleared or moved to make room for Soviet prisoners taken during "Operation Barbarossa". The camp now administered hundreds of Arbeitskommandos each made up of around 30 forced labourers. These were supplied to local farmers and industry.

There was a clear hierarchy among prisoners. At the top were British and American POWs, generally treated correctly according to the Geneva Convention and receiving numerous aid packages from the International Red Cross. As a consequence, they were well-fed until the very end of the war, when transportation and supply links broke down. Prisoners from western Europe (French, Belgians) were also treated as POWs but received less outside help and were not as well-nourished. However, they were in contact with international help organisations. Serbian and Polish nationals were denied access to outside observers. Italians, who came here after September 1943, were deemed traitors by both the German guards and the other prisoners and were at the low end of the hierarchy. They were ill-fed and from the fall of 1944 forced to work with the Wehrmacht or be treated as civilian forced labour. Worst off of all were the Soviet POWs. They were denied POW status, received no outside food and were not allowed access to international observers. Guards had a special shoot-to-kill policy for them. Due to the ill-treatment of the Soviets and a lack of shelter, several epidemics broke out among them. Thousands of them died from disease, starvation and brutal treatment by guards. They were buried in mass graves on the camp graveyard (today's war cemetery).

Among the Italian prisoners, who were mostly soldiers who did not surrender to the German army after the Cassibile armistice, was journalist and writer Giovannino Guareschi, who wrote La favola di Natale ("A Christmas Fable") there on Christmas 1944. The Canadian Neurologist Charles Miller Fisher, who served as a Lieutenant Commander in the Canadian navy, was interned in this camp after being torpedoed and rescued by a German ship.

In August 1944, all POW camps were removed from Wehrmacht control and were assigned to Heinrich Himmler's Schutzstaffel (SS). Although this was without immediate consequences at Sandbostel, in January 1945 POWs were evacuated here from other camps closer to the frontline. On 28 March 1945, a German-organised march of Polish prisoners of war from the Oflag II-D camp reached Stalag X-B and the Poles were interned in the camp. In the final phase of the war, concentration camp prisoners were relocated to Sandbostel. Around 9,000 former inmates of Neuengamme concentration camp and its subcamps were transferred to Stalag X-B in April 1945. They were housed in the former Marlag and guarded well but otherwise left to their own devices: they received no medical help despite rampant diseases, sanitary conditions were dire and the inmates went virtually without food. On 19 April a hunger revolt broke out in one of the kitchens. Its suppression claimed over 300 lives. One day later on 20 April, most of the SS members guarding that section of Stalag X-B marched out of the camp with several hundred prisoners. After that, the POWs were allowed to help the remaining former concentration camp inmates with some of their own food.

== Liberation ==
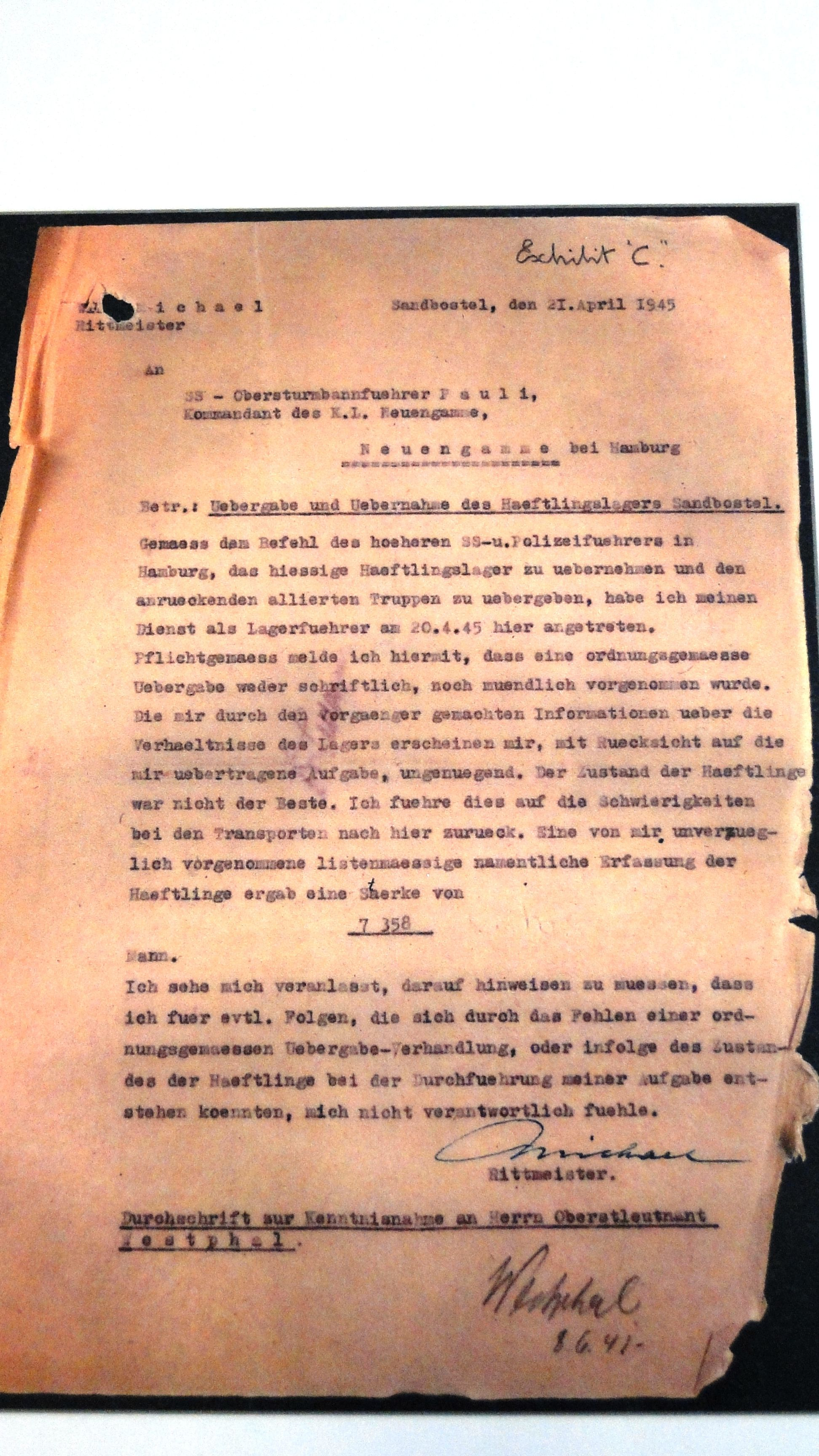
Letter dated 21 April 1945 about the handover of the camp, exhibited at Neuengamme concentration camp.

The camp was liberated on 29 April 1945 by the British Armed Forces of XXX Corps following fighting with the German 15th Panzergrenadier-Division. The camp commandant, however, realizing that the end of the war was close, had already agreed to hand over control of the camp to the prisoners, led by the French Colonel Marcel Albert. On 21 April, the same day that the officer ordered to take control of the camp complained to his superiors about conditions there (see picture), two prisoners carried the call for assistance from the camp to the Guards Armoured Division at Zeven. Two armoured units were sent to Sandbostel but fighting delayed their arrival until 29 April.

The British discovered around 15,000 surviving POWs in the camp, as well as around 8,000 former Konzentrationslager (KZ) Neuengamme inmates.

The camp was divided into three sections when liberated. The first contained allied prisoners in unsatisfactory conditions, but generally in compliance with the International Red Cross Convention. Soviet prisoners, without the Convention's protection, were in substantially worse conditions. In the third section were around 8,000 civilian prisoners in appalling conditions, described in the Army medical history as "utterly horrifying"; "everywhere the dead and dying sprawled amid the slime of human excrement." According to members of the British forces present at the liberation, conditions were so bad, they referred to the Stalag as "a minor Belsen" in a reference to the Bergen-Belsen concentration camp.

The commander of the British Forces in north-western Germany, General Brian Horrocks, was called in and ordered local German civilians and medical orderlies to help with the clean-up, and to bury the numerous dead bodies. Like at Bergen-Belsen, despite the best efforts of the British, hundreds of inmates died every day immediately following the liberation as a result of starvation, typhus and other diseases. Estimates of the total number of people who died here in 1939-45 range between 8,000 and 50,000. There is evidence of at least 5,162 dead. Claims of up to 46,000 killed Soviets alone were made by the Soviet Union but are considered to be exaggerated.

Inmates were cleaned and transferred to an improvised hospital outside the camp and thence to convalescence camps. The former Marlag was burned between 16 and 25 May to prevent a typhus epidemic and the last 350 patients left the hospital on 3 June.

Other, more serviceable, huts were used by the British to house imprisoned Nazis and SS members, who were awaiting trial.

== Cemeteries ==
POW camps were required by Wehrmacht regulations to have a cemetery close by. Initially, the dead of Stalag X-B were buried in the war cemetery at Parnewinkel, where a World War I POW camp had been located previously. As the number of dead rose in 1940, a second cemetery was established near Sandbostel, about 1.2 kilometres from the camp.

Non-Soviet and Soviet POWs were treated differently even in death. The former were buried with military honours in individual graves, the latter in 70 mass graves.

At Sandbostel, the cemetery has two sections. Gräberfeld 1 includes the mass graves. In 1954-56 Gräberfeld 2 received the roughly 2,400 dead among the former concentration camp inmates who could not be identified.

== Post-war use ==
=== British internment camp ===
As early as 8 July 1945, the British military authorities established one of nine civilian internment camps in a part of the former Stalag X-B. At "No. 2 Civil Internment Camp" or "No. 2 CIC" around 5,000 males, including SS members, were interned. Soon, inmates were subject to "re-education", intended to turn Nazi supporters into democrats. To further this goal, internees were allowed to publish their own newspaper Der Windstoss.

In June 1947, the trials began at the Spruchkammergericht at Stade. Internees were not charged with individual crimes but with membership in a criminal organisation, as defined by the Nuremberg trials. The court handed down 3,500 verdicts, ranging from several months to six years' imprisonment. However, the time of internment was counted as time served, so many of the defendants were released immediately following the trial.

After the last inmates were released on 9 March 1948, the British closed the camp on 1 August 1948.

=== Prison ===
In March 1948, the Justice Department of the State of Lower Saxony established the Strafgefängnis Lager Sandbostel at the site of the Stalag. This prison soon housed around 600 male inmates, imprisoned for periods between two months and two years, mostly for property-related crimes, in six large huts.

The prison featured a small hospital, workshops and a Protestant church. Around 110 people worked there, mostly German refugees from the eastern territories lost after WW II. In 1952, the prison was dissolved due to falling numbers of the incarcerated.

=== Camp for refugees from the GDR ===
Beginning in 1952, parts of the camp were used as an emergency reception centre for refugees from Communist East Germany or GDR. On 1 April 1952, the Federal Ministry for Refugees established the Notaufnahmelager Sandbostel for young male refugees aged 15 to 24. In September 1952, a similar camp for women was established at the site of the POW camp at Westertimke. These two camps were under the supervision of the Durchgangslager Uelzen-Bohldamm and a committee decided on individuals' admission to West Germany or to West Berlin. Refugees also received help in finding jobs or apprenticeship positions. Most of the young people were in the camp for just one or two weeks. At Sandbostel, their number averaged around 800, at Westertimke around 300. Daily intake at Sandbostel was up to 100, with roughly the same number leaving each day. In total, around 250,000 young men and 80,000 young women passed through the camps. This use ended around 1960.

=== Bundeswehr and business park ===
In 1963, the German armed forces took over the remaining huts of the camp and used them to store medical supplies. Ten years later, in 1973, the Bundeswehr stopped using the facility. The Ministry of Defence for a while considered building a barracks at the site, but eventually chose Seedorf as the location.

In 1974, the business park "Immenhain" was established in the area of the camp not given over to agricultural use. Businesses set up there included a horse-riding establishment, a reject shop, a militaria shop and a brothel. This use of the former camp area only ended with the establishment of the memorial in the 2000s.

== Memorial ==
A Soviet memorial erected at the cemetery site in 1945 was removed in 1956 by order of the state government of Lower Saxony, due to the memorial's excessive claims regarding the number of victims. Its inscription had read "Hier ruhen 46.000 russische Soldaten und Offiziere, zu Tode gequält in der Nazigefangenschaft" ("Here lie 46,000 Russian soldiers and officers, tortured to death in Nazi imprisonment"). Instead, a new memorial consisting of three steles with the inscription "Euer Opfer | Unsere Verpflichtung | Frieden" ("Your Sacrifice | Our Commitment | Peace") was erected.

Another memorial was erected 1945 or 1946 near the graves of the Polish POWs. Its original Polish inscription can no longer be fully reconstructed today. Alleging dilapidation, this monument was removed in the 1960s and was replaced with a stone high cross and two steles.

The remains of most non-Soviet POWs were repatriated to their countries of origin. The Italians were reinterred at the Italian war cemetery at Hamburg-Öjendorf. Only around 170 individual graves of POWs from Poland, Yugoslavia or of unknown nationality remain in the graveyard at Sandbostel.

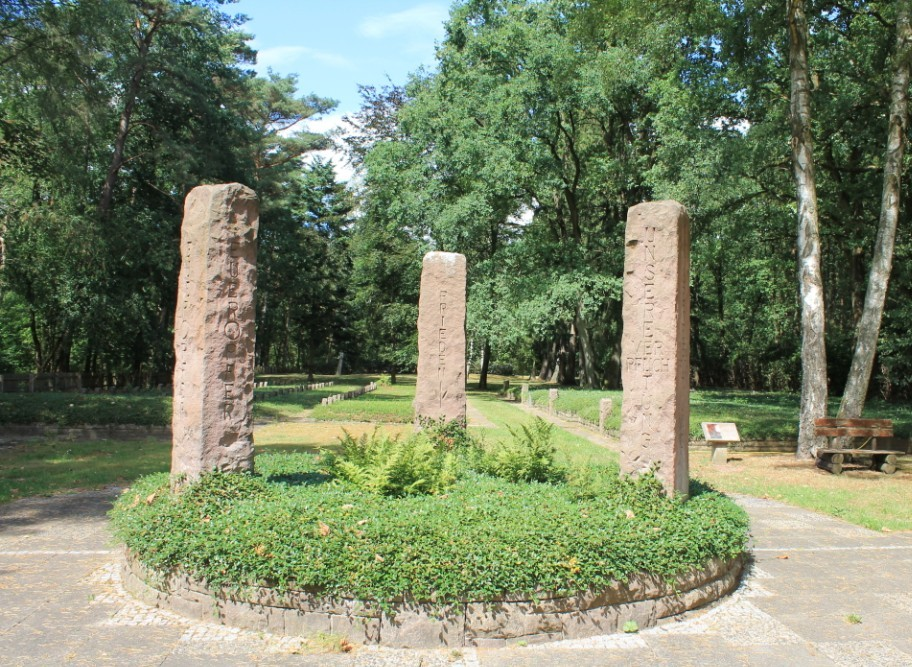
The New Memorial

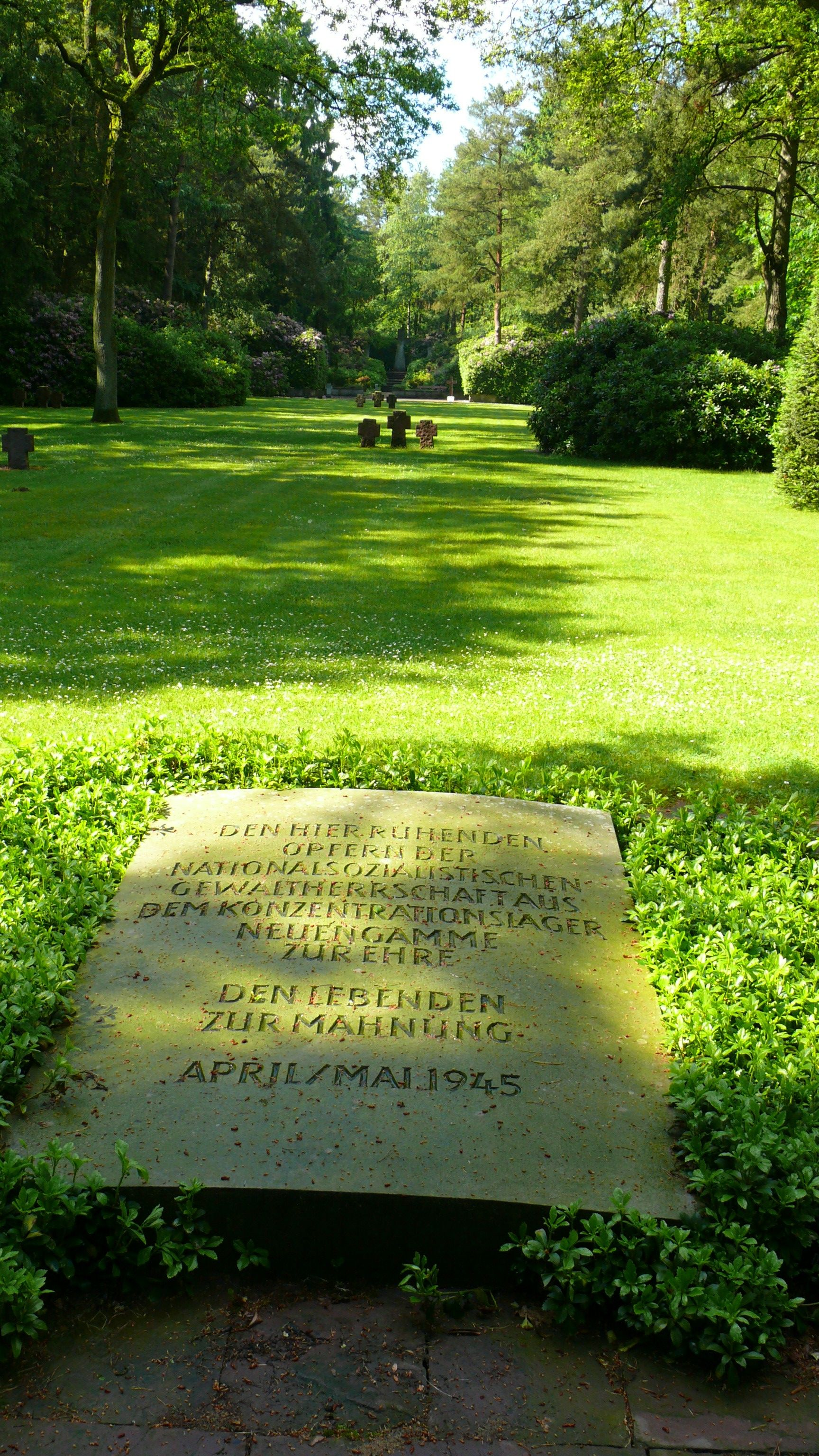
The Concentration Camp Prisoners' Graves

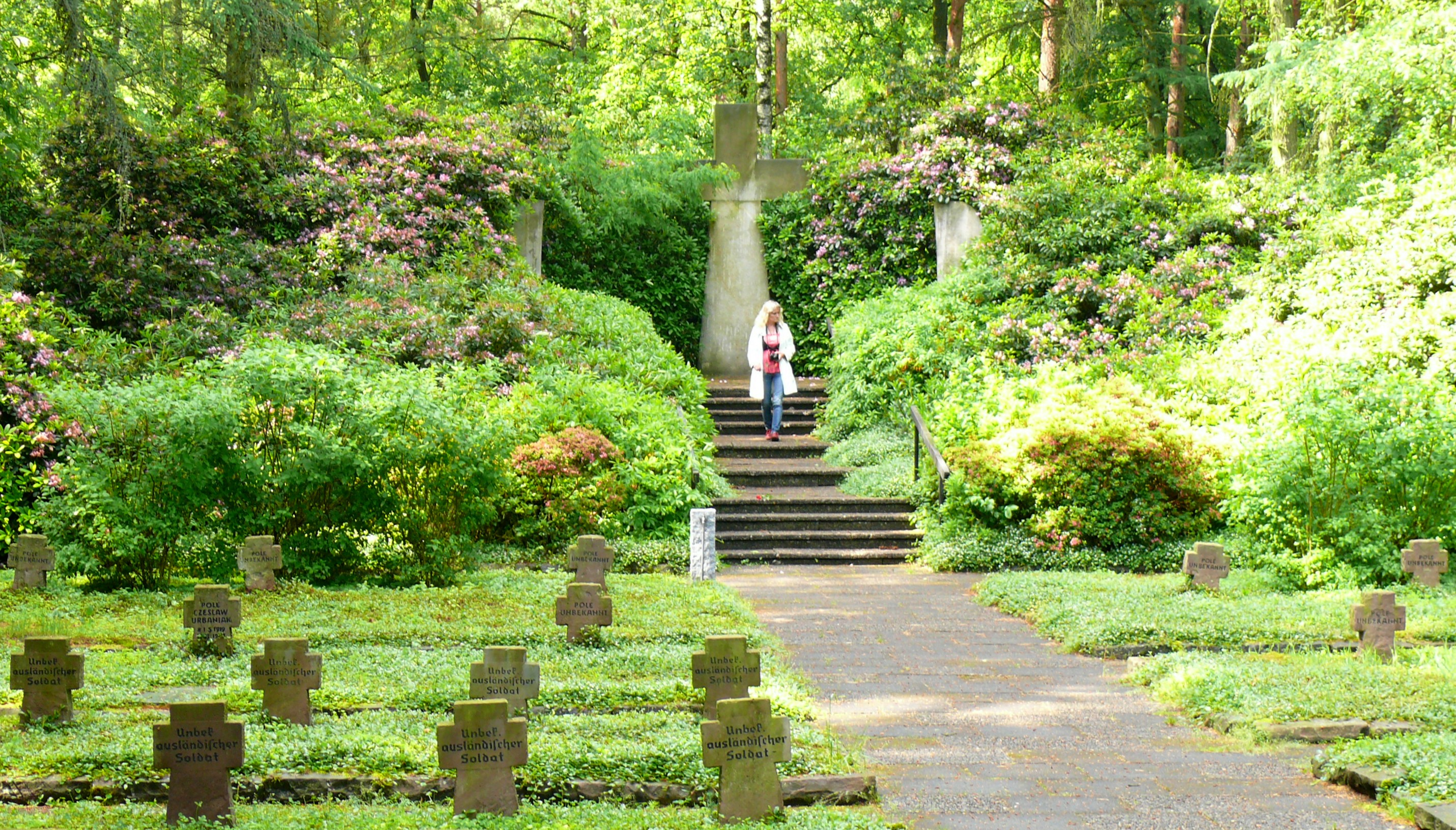
Graves of Polish POWs and the High Cross

A private club was founded in 1992 to work for the maintenance of the camp site. Since that year, most of the huts were treated as listed or protected buildings. The creation of a memorial at the site of the former camp met with substantial local opposition. In 2004, a foundation (Stiftung Lager Sandbostel) was established. Following three years of preparations, the Gedenkstätte Sandbostel was opened in 2007. In April 2013, the permanent exhibition was opened. It consists of two parts: the first covers the POW camp, while the second one spans the period from the camp's liberation through its post-war use to the establishment of the memorial. Out of a total of around 150 huts, more than 20 remain (largely in the area that used to house the Soviet prisoners). Some appear mostly as they did in the 1940s, others have been altered to serve changing needs in the post-war period. In September 2026, the memorial received a grant notification of €4.3 million from the program "Erinnern.Invest – Niedersachsen stärkt Gedenkorte". The funds will be used to renovate the huts and develop a new permanent exhibition by September 2029.

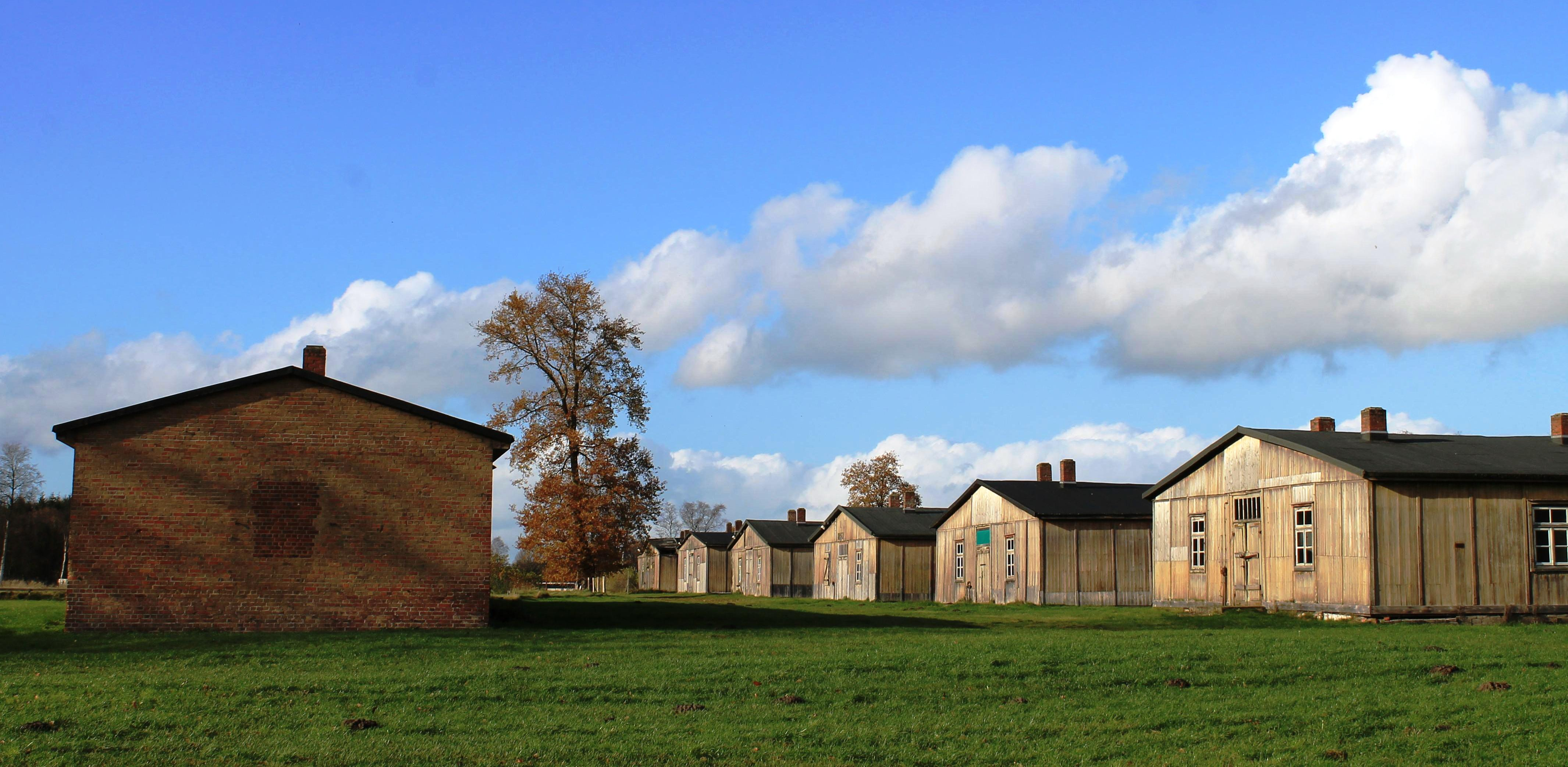
View of the surviving wooden barracks

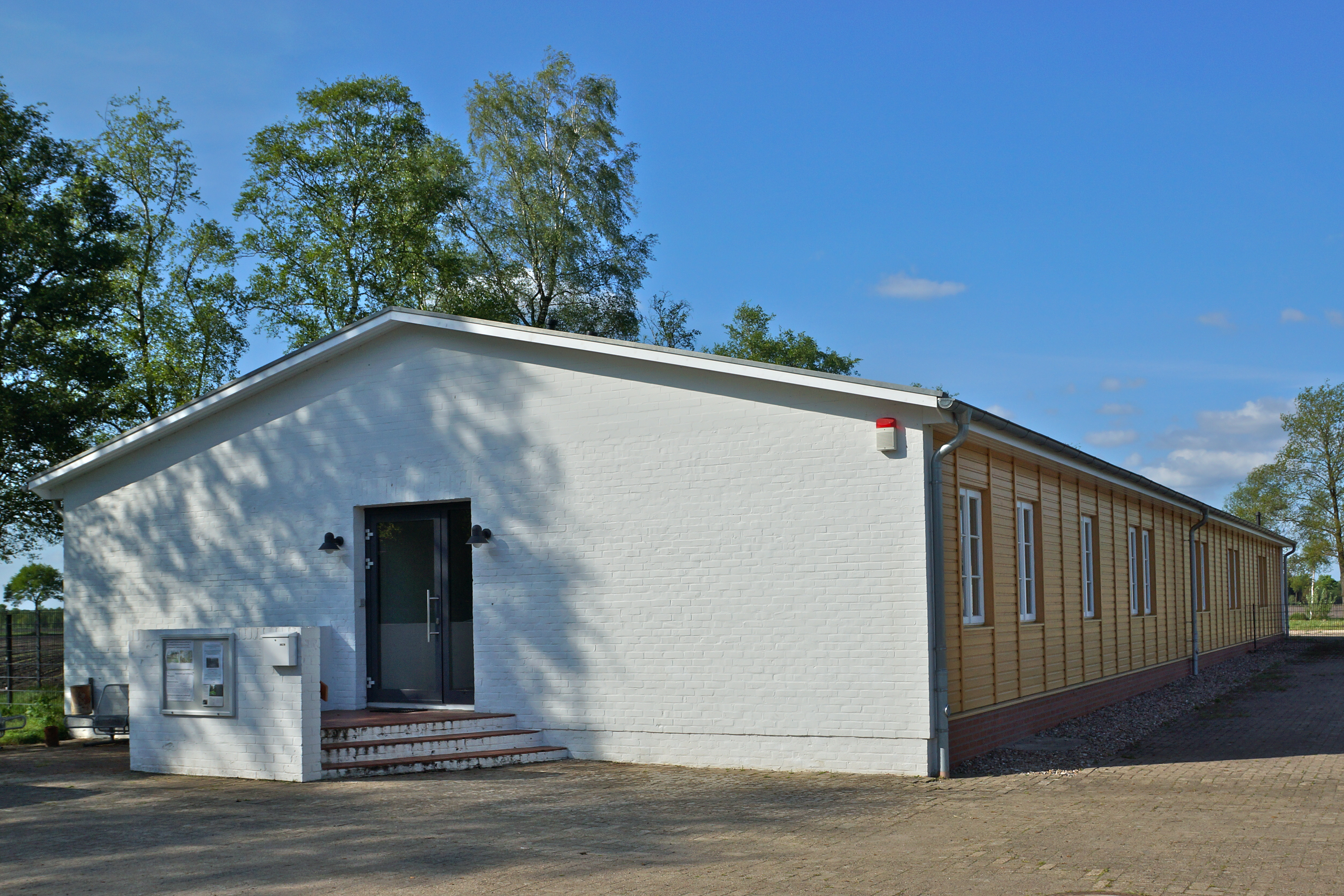
Barrack housing the visitor center and the first part of the permanent exhibition

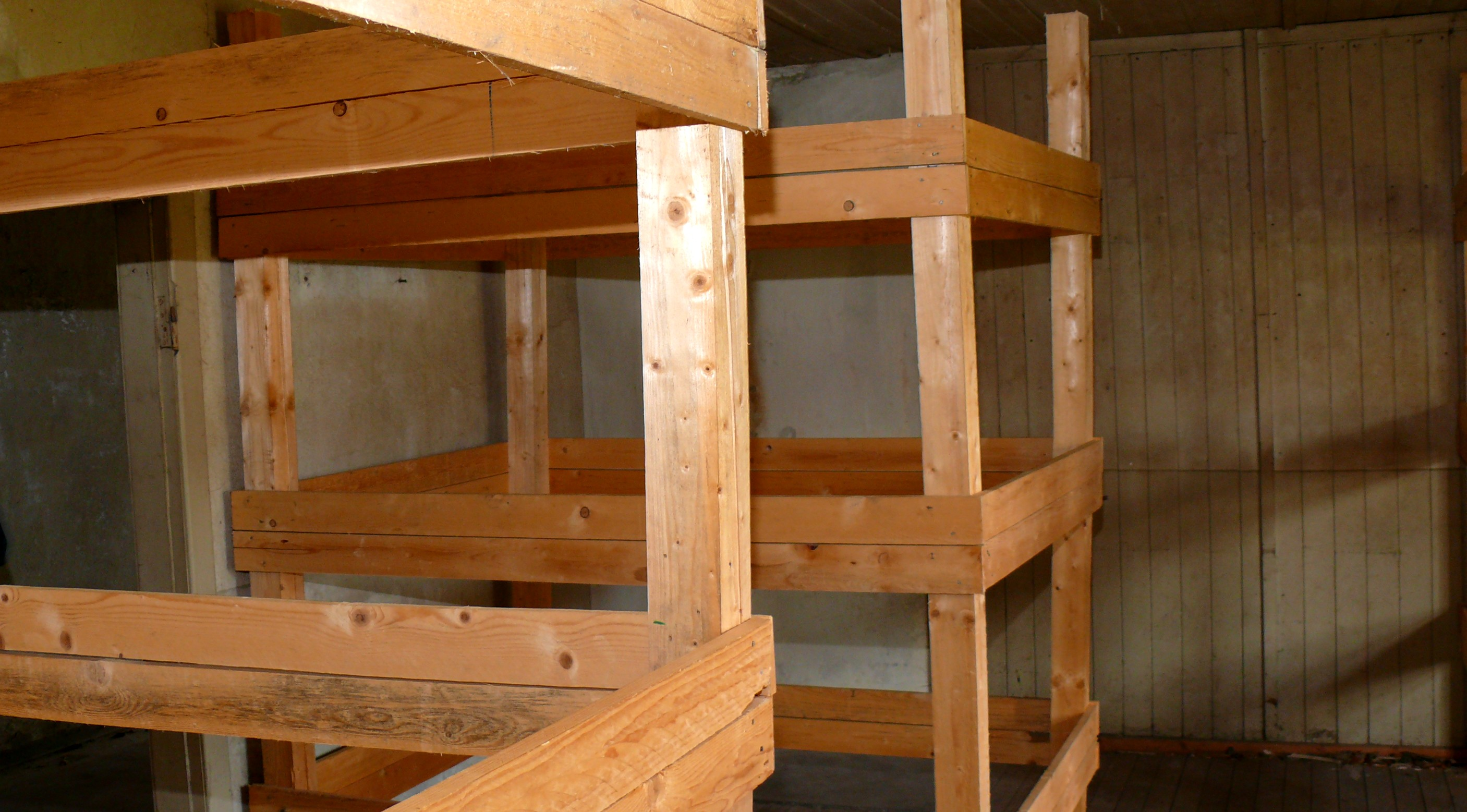
Reconstruction of the sleeping platforms (each for 2 prisoners) inside a barracks building

Former Catholic church, now Bernard Le Godais-Saal

Protestant church

== See also ==
- List of German World War II POW camps
- List of POW camps in Germany
