= Challenge of the North =

Book by Ion Idriess

- First edition
- Author: Ion Idriess
- Language: English
- Publisher: Angus and Robertson
- Publication date: 1969
- Publication place: Australia
- Pages: 153

Challenge of the North: Wealth from Australia's Northern Shores is a 1969 book by Ion Idriess. It was Idriess' final book and contained his ideas for developing Australia's north. He had earlier written about this topic in The Great Boomerang (1941) and Onward Australia (1943).
