= Forty Fathoms Deep =

Book by Ion Idriess

- First edition
- Author: Ion Idriess
- Cover artist: Edgar A. Galloway
- Language: English
- Publisher: Angus and Robertson
- Publication date: 1937
- Publication place: Australia
- Pages: 343 pp
- Preceded by: The Cattle King
- Followed by: Over the Range

Forty Fathoms Deep: Pearl Divers and Sea Rovers in Australian Waters is a 1937 book by Ion Idriess about pearl divers.

It featured characters like Old Con, a British West Indian who lived in Broome, Western Australia.

== Critical reception ==
A reviewer in The Canberra Times noted this as a"unique book": "Mr. Idriess reveals to the reader the technique of pearling with him, the reader boards the lugger for the pearling grounds, makes the acquaintance of skipper and crew, dons the diving dress and descends to the sea floor, sees the wonders of a new and beautiful, fascinating and frightful world, shares the divers' dangers, gathers the shell, opens it on the lugger, thrills at the sight of baroque and pearls, sells them to the dealer and watches as the rough pearl is transformed by delicate and skilful hands into a thing of exquisite loveliness"

In The Sydney Morning Herald the reviewer found a novel trying to cover a lot of ground: "But if his book seems to meander a little, and sometimes lose its way, there can be scarcely a doubt about the sheer power, and often beauty, of certain chapters and passages. Qualities of Mr. Idriess's, such as his extraordinary thoroughness in inquiry, his determination to master every branch of a subject, his almost microscopic accuracy of observation, and his almost poetic gift of natural description-not to speak of narrative power often seen in harmonious combination with this cannot be too often insisted upon as positive and peculiar merits."
