= Charles Eaton (1833 ship) =

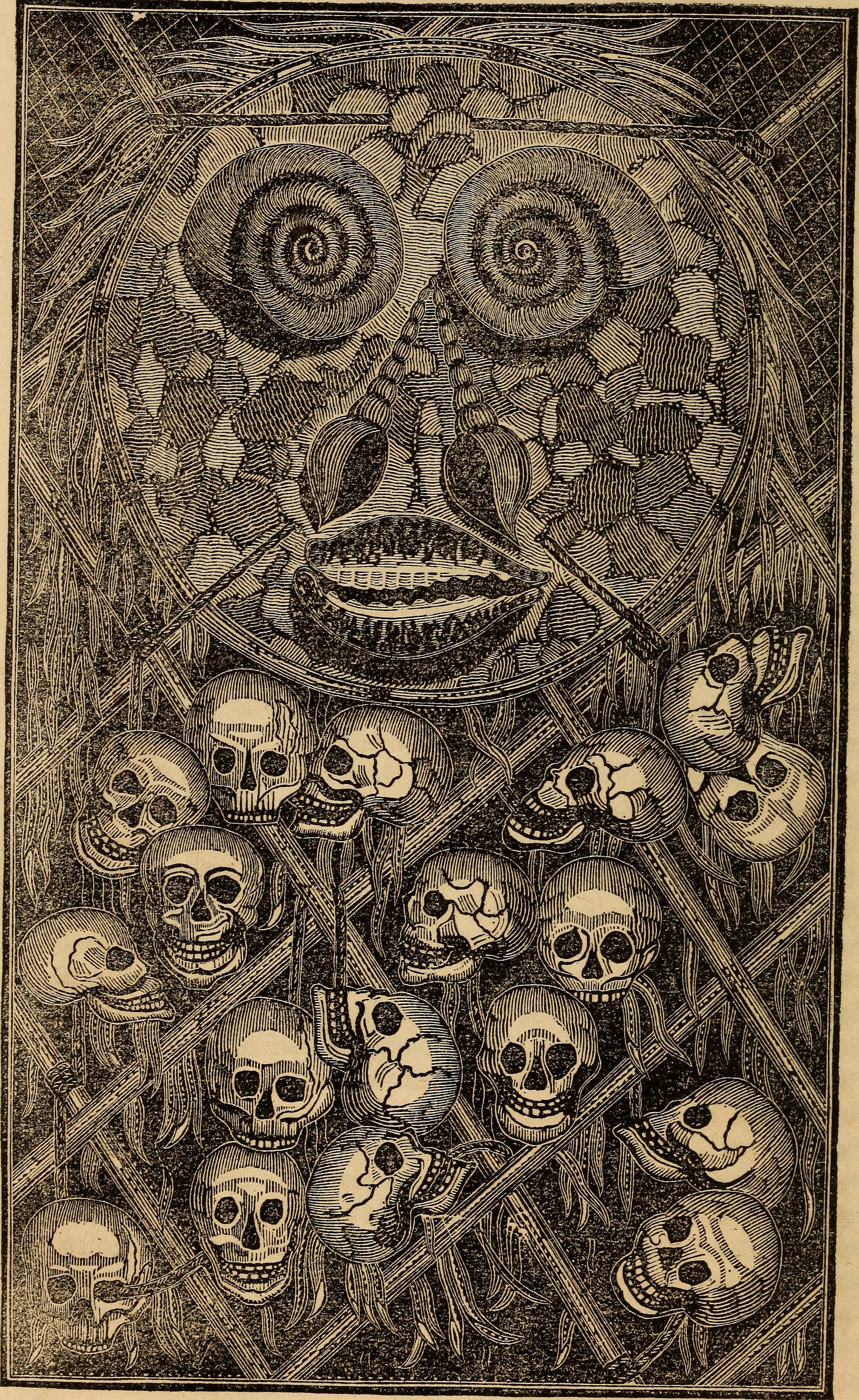

History

United Kingdom
- Name: Charles Eaton
- Namesake: Charles Eaton, former Port Master of Coringa
- Builder: William Smoult Temple, Coringa, near Madras, India
- Launched: 1833
- Fate: Wrecked 1834

General characteristics
- Tons burthen: 350, or 400 (bm)
- Sail plan: Full sail

Charles Eaton was a barque, launched in 1833 for use as a merchant ship. Whilst under the command of Captain Fowle, she was wrecked in 1834 among the Torres Strait Islands, off the northern coast of Queensland, Australia, and her passengers and crew attacked and nearly all killed by Torres Strait Islanders on Mer Island. A cabin boy and small child survived and lived with the islanders until being rescued by Captain Lewis and crew on Isabella in June 1836, who also found skulls of some of the murdered people on a nearby island and took them back to Sydney for burial.

== Career ==
Reputedly a fine-looking wooden barque, she was built in a shipbuilding yard at Coringa, near Madras in India, where she was launched in January 1833. Registered in London at 313 tons to carry 350 tons burden, she was built of the best teak, and had two flush decks, forecastle, bust head, and quarter galleries. She was coppered to the wales in chunam and felt.

She was named after a Captain Charles Eaton, a former ship's captain, trader and owner of several ships, who gave up the sea to settle ashore as the Port Master of Coringa, a town to the north of Madras. He died there in 1827. One of his daughters, Sophia, married William Gibson, at one time the manager of a shipbuilding yard in the region. Eaton's son, Captain Charles W. Eaton, took over his father's role as Coringa's Port Master from 1828 to 1838, and was the part-owner of at least three merchant ships.

Charles Eaton, under the command of Captain Fowle, arrived in London with 1000 chests of indigo worth about £45,000. On 14 June 1833 Lloyd’s Shipping List had noted that: "The cargo saved from the James Sibbald, built in Bombay, and wrecked on reefs off Coringa in 1832, has been reshipped per Charles Eaton".

Gledstanes & Co. had recently purchased the ship, for use as a sailing ship usable for general purposes and passengers.

Her first trading voyage from Saint Katharine's Dock in London was to the Australian penal colonies. Her passengers included an Irish lawyer called George Armstrong and 40 pauper children from the Children's Friend Society. Also on board was a young ship's boy called John Ireland, the only member of the crew who lived to tell the story of what happened to the Charles Eaton. She cleared the Thames River on 20 December 1833, and set sail the next day with favourable winds. After a stopover at The Downs to collect more passengers from the village of Deal, she collided with another vessel. She left Falmouth, England for good on 5 February 1834 with sundry cargo, including calicoes and lead.

== The wreck ==
Charles Eaton was en route from Sydney to Singapore by way of the Torres Strait. She had made two stopovers in Australia, at Hobart Town and Sydney. At Hobart Town she obtained new passengers returning to India after two years' sick leave: Captain Thomas D'Oyly of the Bengal Artillery, his wife Charlotte, his two sons George and William, and their Indian ayah (nurse). The barque left Sydney on 29 July 1834 and was wrecked on the Great Barrier Reef near the Sir Charles Hardy Islands on 15 August 1834.

Five of the crew took one of the quarter boats and set out for Timor but were subsequently taken captive at an island then called Timor Laut, but now called Yamdena, part of the Tanimbar group of islands.

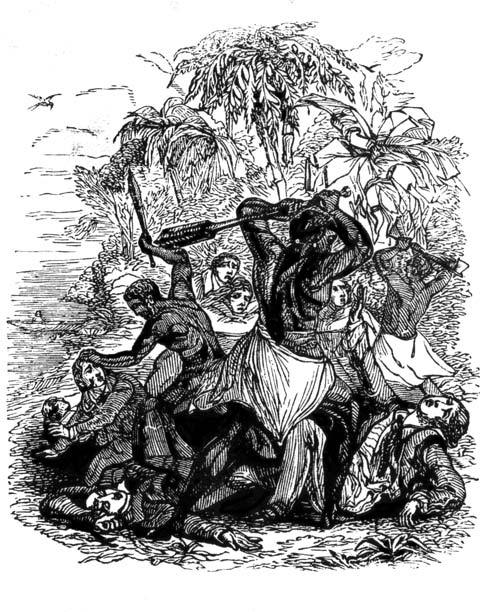
Image from John Ireland’s book The shipwrecked orphans: A true narrative of shipwreck and sufferings of John Ireland and William Doyly (Teller's amusing, instructive and entertaining tales).

Those remaining at the wreck made two rafts, the first of which set sail with all the passengers, Captain Moore, surgeon Grant, steward Montgomery and two strong sailors to man the oars. They reached a small sandy cay now called Boydang, inhabited at the time by visiting Torres Strait islanders, who killed all the adults and kept their skulls for their daily ceremonial rituals. Only William and George D'Oyly were spared.

The second raft left Charles Eaton's wreck with the rest of the crew and they, too, were murdered and beheaded by the visiting party of islanders.

Of the 26 or 27 people and the ship's dog, Portland, remaining with the wreck, only four boys initially survived. The rest were killed by Torres Strait Islanders. They were the two young ship's boys, John Ireland and John Sexton, and the two D'Oyly children, George, aged seven, and William, aged three. Sexton and George D'Oyly died soon afterwards.

John Ireland and William D'Oyly lived with their captors for some months, and were eventually exchanged to a couple from Murray Island (local name Mer) in the Torres Strait, for a bunch of bananas.

The two boys were treated with kindness by the Murray Islanders, being renamed Wak and Uass, and lived with them from about September/October 1834 until June 1836.

== Rescue ==
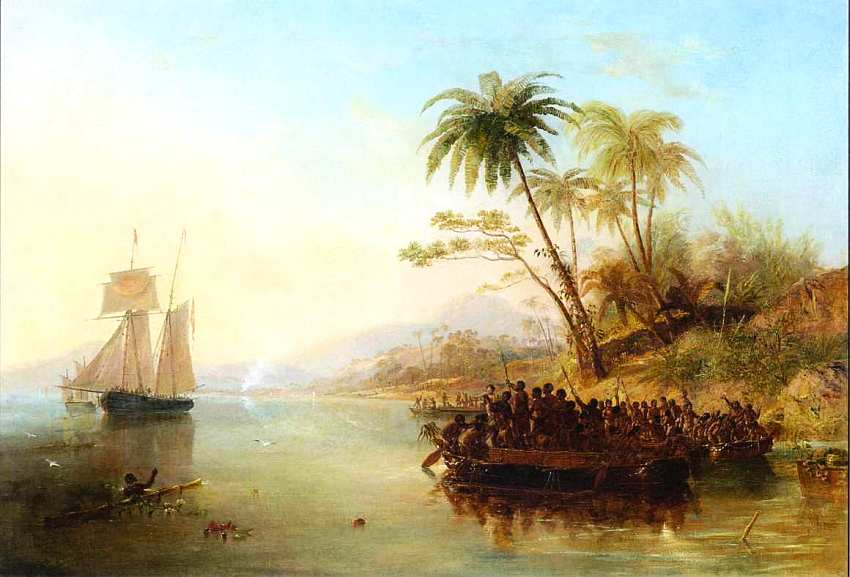
The rescue of William D'Oyly, 1841

On 3 June 1836 the 126-ton colonial schooner Isabella, commanded by Captain Charles Morgan Lewis, was dispatched from Sydney Cove to make a search for reported survivors of the Charles Eaton being held captive at Murray Island. The Isabella arrived at Murray Island on 19 June and the two survivors were handed over to Captain Lewis, after which Lewis and his crew took masks from Mer while interacting with the local people.

After being told by a group of locals on the island of Massid (Yorke Island, or Masig) that men from Aureed had taken skulls back to that island, Lewis went to explore the group of small islands that he called the "Six Sisters", one of which was Aureed. Anchoring there, armed men went on to the island and found it deserted, the village abandoned. After burning the village to the ground, the men found a dilapidated shed, and in it a huge mask made of a single decorated turtle shell surrounded by human skulls of Europeans. This was later identified as a "skull house" used by the followers of Kulka. Lewis and his men took the skulls and mask, and set fire to everything on the island, including plantations of tobacco. Lewis dubbed the island "Skull Island", although this name was not taken up.

== Aftermath ==
Apart from the surviving youths, Isabella also carried back artefacts collected by Lewis as well as the skulls that were found on the island of Aureed, 17 of which were believed to be those of the murdered passengers and crew, after being identified as European skulls by a surgeon in Sydney in November 1836. The skulls were buried on 17 November 1836 in a mass grave in the Devonshire Street Cemetery in Sydney, not far from the grave of the chief officer of Isabella, who had died about a week earlier from an illness brought on by the rescue voyage. A monument was erected in the form of a huge altar stone to record the manner by which they died. When the Devonshire Street Cemetery was resumed for the site of the Central Railway Station in 1904 the skulls and the monument were removed to Bunnerong Cemetery at Botany Bay in Sydney.

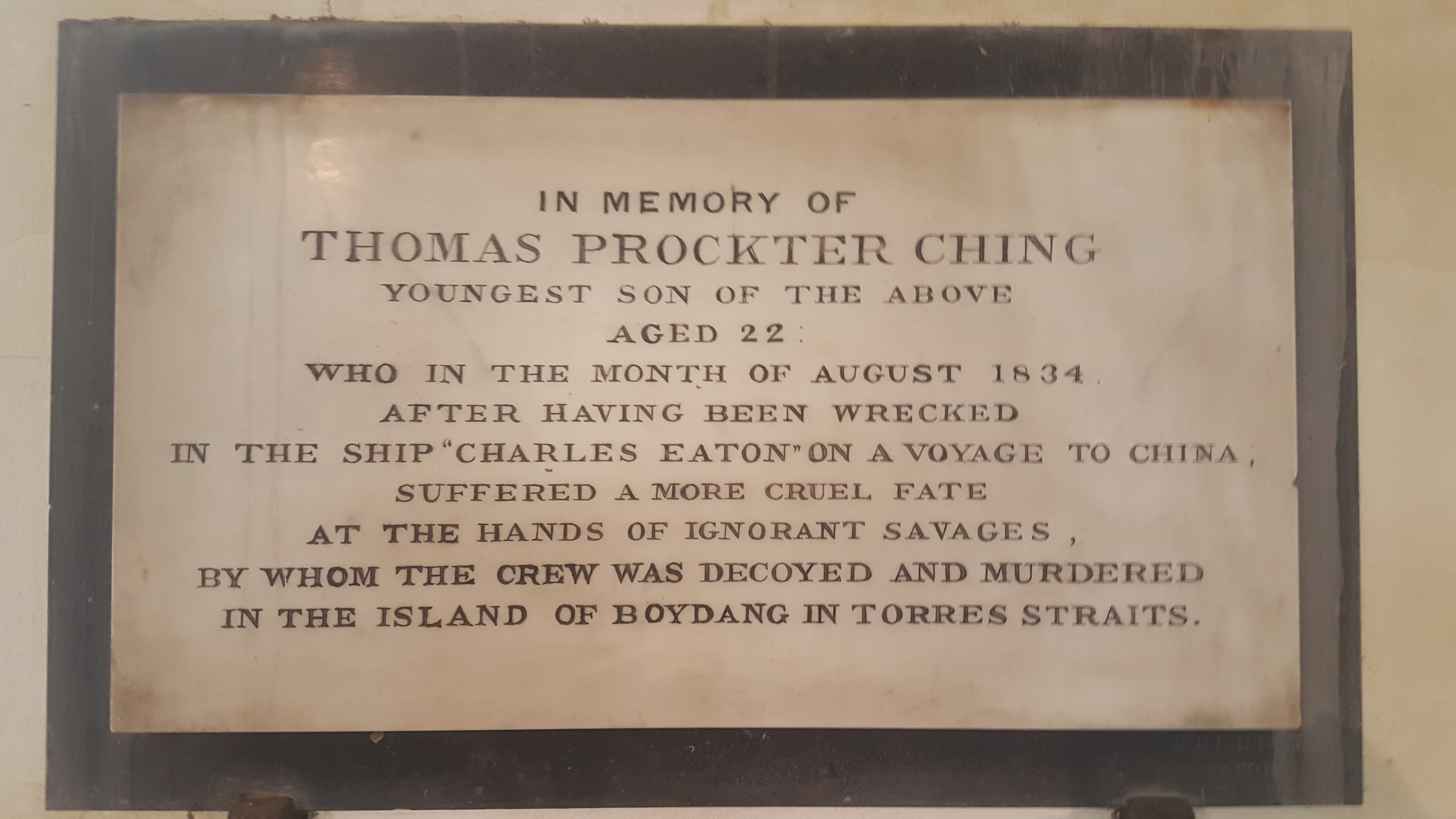
Memorial to Thomas Prockter Ching in St Mary Magdalene's Church, Launceston, Cornwall.

Captain Lewis took William D'Oyly to relatives in London, departing Sydney on HMS Buffalo (1813) on 13 May 1838. Lewis was appointed harbour master at Port Phillip in 1840, but later suffered from insanity and became destitute.

== In literature ==
The fate of the passengers inspired the book Drums of Mer (1933) by Ion Idriess, which he later reworked into a children's book, Headhunters of the Coral Sea.

The story has also been told in other works of historical fiction and non-fiction (see Further Reading below).

== The Lewis Collection ==
A collection of anthropological items collected in the Torres Strait Islands by Lewis was given to the Australian Museum in Sydney and became known as the Lewis Collection. This was the earliest collection of artefacts from the region held by any institution, and were the only objects held by that museum from that region. In 1882 a fire destroyed Sydney's Garden Palace building, as well as much of the museum's ethnological collection. However, a number of items had been transferred to Denmark's Nationalmuseet in Copenhagen some time before the fire, including a large mask which, it has been suggested, may be the mask from Aureed.
