= Barbara Thompson (castaway) =

Scottish shipwreck survivor (c. 1831 – 1912)

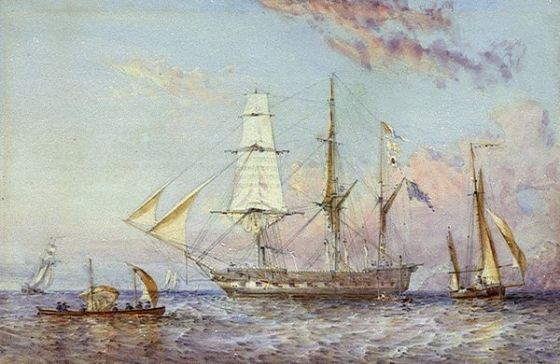
HMS Rattlesnake, which rescued Barbara Thompson, by Oswald Walters Brierly

Barbara Crawford Thompson (c. 1831–1912) was a Scottish woman who, as a teenaged girl, survived a shipwreck in the Torres Strait Islands of Australia and spent five years living with the local Kaurareg people. She was possibly the sole survivor of the November 1844 wreck of the cutter America, which ran onto Madjii Reef at Horn Island in Endeavour Strait near Cape York, Queensland.

== Early life ==
She was born Barbara Crawford in Dundee, Scotland. She emigrated with her family to New South Wales on the immigrant ship John Barry which reached Sydney on 13 July 1837. The occupation of her father Charles Crawford was given as tinsmith.

== Shipwreck ==
At the time of the shipwreck, Barbara Crawford Thompson had lived for twenty months in Brisbane with her lover Captain William Thompson as his de facto wife. The cutter America left Moreton Bay to salvage whale oil from the wreck of a whaler lost on the Bampton Shoal. Thompson is presumed to have died while trying to swim ashore after his cutter wrecked on a reef. Barbara survived and was rescued by Torres Strait Islanders. She was taken in by one of the clan leaders (buwai gizumabaigalai) of the Kaurareg people who believed that Barbara was the returned spirit (markai) of his recently deceased daughter.

Barbara lived on Prince of Wales Island (Muralug) for five years and was called "Gioma" or "Giom" by her adopted family.

== Rescue ==
On 16 October 1849, Barbara/Gioma managed to make contact with the British survey ship HMS Rattlesnake at Evans Bay near Cape York, and left with the ship. The Rattlesnake's artist, Oswald Walters Brierly, made detailed notes of her stay with the Kaurareg. Rattlesnake moored back in Sydney in February 1850, and Thompson was reunited with her family.

Little is known about her later life. It is believed she remarried at least once and died in 1912.

== Books ==
Thompson's story is fictionalised in the 1947 book Isles of Despair by Ion Idriess.

Raymond J. Warren documents the events in the book Wildflower: The Barbara Crawford Thompson Story.
