= Man Tracks =

Book by Ion Idriess

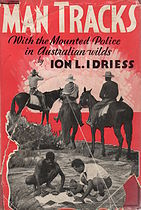
- First edition
- Author: Ion Idriess
- Language: English
- Genre: historical
- Publisher: Angus and Robertson
- Publication date: 1935
- Publication place: Australia

Man Tracks, with the mounted police in the Australian Wilds is a 1935 book by Australian author Ion Idriess about the mounted police in north west Western Australia.

It includes profiles on Aboriginal outlaws and leaders such as Joe Flick, Nemarluk and Minmara; the murder of Traynor and Fagan off Woodah Island; the spearing of Constable McColl; the ambushing of Hemming's patrol; the killing of the Japanese of the luggers' Ouida, The Myrtle, The Olga and the Raff; the spearing of Stephens and Cobb.

Idriess later wrote a follow-up, Nemarluk: King of the Wilds (1941).
