= Drums of Mer =

1933 novel by Ion Idriess

- First edition
- Author: Ion Idriess
- Language: English
- Genre: novel
- Publisher: Angus and Robertson
- Publication date: 1933
- Publication place: Australia

Drums of Mer is a 1933 Australian novel by Ion Idriess set in the Torres Strait in present-day Queensland, Australia.

== Background ==
It was based on a true story about the survivors of the wrecked ship the Charles Eaton. The characters were composites of real people.

Idriess later called the book "a blood-thirsty thing, and it's told from the angle of the Torres Strait islanders. There are killings and wars and all sorts of horrible things in it, but it seems to appeal. I was a bit frightened at first, that the womenfolk would not like it. They seem to want it, however." The book was a best seller in Australia.

Idriess later reworked the same material in a children's book, Headhunters of the Coral Sea.

== Reception ==
The Daily Telegraph wrote "Mr. Idriess is writing romance, not history, and very good romance, too, if his style were better. But, since he quotes authorities, why not be right about easily-ascertained facts?"

The Newcastle Sun declared "The faults in the book... are almost entirely confined to the fiction part of it. Mr. Idriess has succeeded admirably in his description work."

The Sydney Morning Herald wrote "the book is highly interesting. The information given is valuable, and the author states that in all essentials it is fact, both historically and ethnologically. He tells the incidents with vigour and high dramatic colouring."

The Argus thought "Mr Idriess his seized upon the most colourful aspects of this decayed civilisation before it has been completely lost to livIng memory and has dramatised them with his uncanny gift for realistic narrative writing."

The Sydney Sun argued "this book is different from the author's previous works in all save quality, in that he has dipped far into the past for story and setting; and the result is a work of rugged strength. Literary faults are found, but they are of the kind that seem characteristic of the writer. They are not the faults of a labored search for expressive phrases, but rather the evi dence of an Imagination that hastens enthusiastically ahead of the facts marshalled in long, painstaking historical research."

The Australian Women's Weekly wrote that the book "though excellent reading, just falls short of the high standard one is beginning to expect from this writer and it misses, for lack of careful sub-editing."

== Proposed film adaptation ==
In the 1930s Claude Flemming attempted to make a film version.

Sandy Harbutt planned to make a film version of it in the late 1970s with his then-wife Helen Morse as associate producer. Research trips were undertaken to various locations in 1977. In October 1977 Harbutt was reportedly writing a script in the New Hebridies and hoped to start filming in April 1978. In 1999 Harbutt said he still intended to make the movie. However no film resulted.

== Dance adaptation ==
In 1996 the Aboriginal Islander Dance Theatre presented a theatre production based on the novel.
