= In Crocodile Land =

Book by Ion Idriess

- First edition
- Author: Ion Idriess
- Language: English
- Genre: non-fiction
- Publisher: Angus and Robertson
- Publication date: 1946
- Publication place: Australia

In Crocodile Land is a 1946 Australian book by Ion Idriess about life in the Northern Territory.
