= Australian Guerilla series =

Series of books by Ion Idriess

- cover
- Author: Ion Idriess
- Language: English
- Publisher: Angus and Robertson
- Publication date: 1942–43
- Publication place: Australia

The Australian Guerilla series was a series of 6 handbooks published in World War II by Ion Idriess. Idriess had been a sniper during World War I. The books were written when Australia was under threat of invasion during World War II.

== Books in the series ==
- Australian Guerilla – Book 1 – Shoot to Kill (1942) – how to become an expert rifleman. According to the Sydney Morning Herald:

This book is written in the author's own inimitable, man-to-man style. Mr. Idriess here reveals the secrets of the dead shot. What to do and what not to do, are impressed upon the budding rifleman. He brings out clearly the importance of apparently trifling points. No more opportune book could have been published. Australia — for the first time in its history — has been bombed. Invasion now looms on our northern frontier. The imperative need now is for rifles—and more rifles. Here is a book that should be in the hands of every able-bodied – Australian. The motives that have lnspired the writing of it are— the author says— twofold: 'The consciousness that hundreds of thousands of Australians have not even a rudimentary knowledge of how to effectively use and care for the Service Rifle; and the conviction— gathered from forty years' experience— that this handicap can be largely overcome by studying and grasping a few fundamental principles.' These principles are clearly and explicitly laid down, and- abundantly illustrated, in this manual.

- Australian Guerilla – Book 2 – Sniping (1942) – sniping. According to one review, "A believer in guerilla warfare in the open spaces of Australia, Mr. Idriess seeks, by thrilling narrative and advice, to teach young men and people of the back country how to use the rifle to the best advantage. To be a guerilla one has to be a good riflemen—a sniper—acting independently of other troops, clever at camouflage, with keen ears, and with eyes that are observant and sharp."
- Australian Guerilla – Book 3 – Guerilla Tactics (1942) – An illustrative detail of the technique of guerrilla warfare under Australian conditions
- Australian Guerilla – Book 4 – Trapping the Jap (1942) – To attack and to ambush, to snipe and raid is the job of the Australian Guerrilla
- Australian Guerilla – Book 5 – Lurking Death (1943) – True stories of snipers in Gallipoli, Sinai and Palestine
- Australian Guerilla – Book 6 – The Scout (1943)
