= My Mate Dick =

Book by Ion Idriess

- First edition
- Author: Ion Idriess
- Language: English
- Genre: autobiography
- Publisher: Angus and Robertson
- Publication date: 1962
- Publication place: Australia
- Pages: 244

My Mate Dick is an autobiographical 1962 book by Ion Idriess. It was based on his prospecting days and focuses on his adventures in Cape York Peninsula with his best friend the prospector-explorer, Dick Welsh.

Idriess had previously dedicated The Opium Smugglers to Welsh.
