= Nemarluk: King of the Wilds =

Book by Ion Idriess

- First edition cover design
- Author: Ion Idriess
- Language: English
- Genre: biography
- Publisher: Angus and Robertson
- Publication date: 1941
- Publication place: Australia

Nemarluk: King of the Wilds is a book by Ion Idriess about aboriginal warrior Nemarluk.

Idriess met Nemarluk twice and had previously written about him in a section of his 1935 book Man Tracks. Nemarluck died in August 1940 prompting Idriess to write a book focusing on him.

The Sydney Morning Herald wrote that:

Mr. Idriess has a good tale to tell—a tale of courage, animal cunning and resource, devotion to a dimly conceived ideal, and death. The confusion wrought in the aboriginal groups by the, to them, incredible treachery of the members of the tribe who accept money from the white man for information, and the use of that peculiar sensitiveness that makes the black man such an excellent "tracker", affords material for interesting conjecture. The reader who is quite unversed in aboriginal lore would, too, find much to interest him In the accounts of tribal customs and racial prejudices.
