= The Vanished People =

Book by Ion Idriess

- First edition
- Author: Ion Idriess
- Language: English
- Publisher: Angus and Robertson
- Publication date: 1955
- Publication place: Australia

The Vanished People is a 1955 historical book by Ion Idriess. It tells stories of northern Australia and New Guinea, including the saga of Mary Watson in 1881.
