= One Wet Season =

Book by Ion Idriess

- First edition
- Author: Ion Idriess
- Language: English
- Genre: travel
- Publisher: Angus and Robertson
- Publication date: 1949
- Publication place: Australia

One Wet Season is a 1949 book by Ion Idriess about life in the Kimberley region of Western Australia during the wet season of 1934. The book records true stories of the lives of the pioneers and Aboriginals of the Kimberley, centring predominantly on those living in the King Leopold Ranges and spending the wet season in the town of Derby, Western Australia.
