= The Nor'-westers =

Book by Ion Idriess

- First edition
- Author: Ion Idriess
- Language: English
- Publisher: Angus and Robertson
- Publication date: 1954
- Publication place: Australia

The Nor-'westers : Stories and Sketches of Life in Australia's "Out Back" is a 1954 book by Ion Idriess.

It consists of a series of sketches by Idriess about the north west of Australia, much of it autobiographical.
