= The Tin Scratchers =

Book by Ion Idriess

- First edition
- Author: Ion Idriess
- Cover artist: Clem Seale
- Language: English
- Genre: autobiography
- Publisher: Angus and Robertson
- Publication date: 1959
- Publication place: Australia
- Pages: 260 pp

The Tin Scratchers: The Story of Tin Mining in the Far North is a 1959 autobiographical book by Ion Idriess.

The book is an account of Idriess' attempts at making a fortune mining in the Cape York Peninsula and how he became involved in tin mining. "From his own memories, Idriess provides accounts of the outback characters who were individuals to a man."

== Reviews ==
In The Sydney Morning Herald, the reviewer noted: "That tireless narrator of frontierland tales, Ion Idriess, is still able to find vivid sources of reading interest in the remote outback." They went on that the novel "begins a little uneasily – due, one suspects, to some rather improbable conversations between the characters – but once it settles down to relate Mr Idriess' practical experiences it becomes increasingly interesting."
