= Men of the Jungle =

Book by Ion Idriess

- fourth edition (1933)
- Author: Ion Idriess
- Language: English
- Publisher: Angus and Robertson
- Publication date: 1932
- Publication place: Australia

Men of the Jungle is a 1932 book by Ion Idriess. It covered three years in the life of Idriess and his three companions as they worked in north-east Queensland.

== Reception ==
The book was published in September 1932 and had to be republished almost immediately.

Idriess later claimed the book was his favourite because it reminded him of the most idyllic time of his life.
