= Prospecting for Gold =

Book by Ion Idriess

- First edition
- Author: Ion Idriess
- Language: English
- Genre: non-fiction
- Publisher: Angus and Robertson
- Publication date: 1931
- Publication place: Australia

Prospecting for Gold is a 1931 nonfiction book by Ion Idriess. It is a guide on how to prospect for gold.

== Background ==
Idriess was doing odd jobs when he wrote the book. He says he was inspired to do so because it was the Great Depression, and he thought many unemployed people were interested in gold prospecting. He wrote the book relatively quickly and it was soon picked up for publication.

== Reception ==
It was the first of Idriess' books to sell a decent amount. The author later recalled, " People bought that prospecting book, and I made enough money out of it to pay rent to my Darlinghurst landlady, buy a new pair of shoes, and get some tucker." He was launched as a professional writer.

In 1939 it was reported the book sold just over twelve thousand copies in Australasia, "a world's record for a semi-technical book."

== Cyaniding for Gold ==
Cyaniding for Gold
- Author: Ion Idriess
- Language: English
- Genre: technical
- Publisher: Angus and Robertson
- Publication date: 1939
- Publication place: Australia

Cyaniding for Gold is a 1939 book by Idriess. It is a follow-up to Prospecting for Gold.

It focuses on the cyaniding process. It included a chapter on mining-engineer E. W. O'Brien's air-slaked lime discovery. According to the Adelaide Mail:

The pen that has written so many fine books of the Australian out back here makes a valuable contribution in a simple and detailed account intended especially for the working miner and small syndicate. The process is practically explained from A to Z, whether the reader can invest only £20 in a plant, or a syndicate or company can afford £2,000. Most of the material has been gathered from plants working profitably today, and from the experience of practical men well known in the Australasian cyaniding world, while numerous illustrations and diagrams further assist the reader. The result is a book that should be particularly valuable, even to non technical readers.

== Fortunes in Minerals ==
Fortunes in Minerals
- Author: Ion Idriess
- Language: English
- Genre: non-fiction
- Publisher: Angus and Robertson
- Publication date: 1941
- Publication place: Australia

Fortunes in Minerals is a 1941 book by Idriess about mining.

== Opals and Sapphires ==
Opals and Sapphires
- Author: Ion Idriess
- Language: English
- Genre: non-fiction
- Publisher: Angus and Robertson
- Publication date: 1967
- Publication place: Australia

Opals and Sapphires: How to Work, Mine, Class, Cut, Polish, and Sell Them is a 1967 book by Ion Idriess.
