= The Yellow Joss =

Collected stories by Ion Idriess

The Yellow Joss and Other Tales
- First edition cover
- Author: Ion Idriess
- Cover artist: Dorothy Wall
- Language: English
- Genre: short story collection
- Publisher: Angus and Robertson
- Publication date: 1934
- Publication place: Australia
- Pages: 266

The Yellow Joss: And Other Tales is a collection of short stories from Ion Idriess, first published in Australia by Angus and Robertson in 1934.

The collection consists of 28 short stories, originally published in a number of publications. They focus on life in North Australia.

== Contents ==
- "The Yellow Joss"
- "The Sniper"
- "The Cockatoo"
- "The Kings Colour"
- "The Piebald's Bell"
- "The Miracle"
- "The Squatting Devil of Samurai"
- "The Death Stone"
- "A Smile from Neptune"
- "The Cruise of the Greyhound"
- "The Booya"
- "The Bones of Leon Chang"
- "The Call of the Pack"
- "A Fisher of Maubiag"
- "The City of Silence"
- "The Sandalwood Getters"
- "The Yellow Lily"
- "The Pearls of Gungadool"
- "And God Gave Man Dominion"
- "The Castaway"
- "The Endless Mystery"
- "The Vanishing Dream"
- "The White Witch"
- "Golden Hair"
- "Account Rendered"
- "The Bridge"
- "The Rivals and a Devil-Fish"
- "The Woes of 'Scandalous' Graham"
