= Back o' Cairns =

Book by Ion Idriess

- First edition
- Author: Ion Idriess
- Language: English
- Genre: autobiography
- Publisher: Angus and Robertson
- Publication date: 1958
- Publication place: Australia

Back o' Cairns: The Story of Gold Prospecting in the Far North is a 1958 autobiographical book by Ion Idriess. It is based on his adventures looking for gold in the Cape York Peninsula.
