= The Great Trek (book) =

Book by Ion Idriess

The Great Trek: One of the Greatest Feats in Australian Exploration
- First edition
- Author: Ion Idriess
- Language: English
- Publisher: Angus and Robertson
- Publication date: 1940
- Publication place: Australia

The Great Trek: One of the Greatest Feats in Australian Exploration is a 1940 book by Ion Idriess about Francis and Alex Jardine's 1864 trek in the northern Cape York Peninsula, from Rockhampton to Somerset in 1864.
