= Lightning Ridge (book) =

Book by Ion Idriess

- First edition
- Author: Ion Idriess
- Language: English
- Genre: memoir
- Publisher: Angus and Robertson
- Publication date: 1940
- Publication place: Australia

Lightning Ridge is a 1940 book by Ion Idriess. It was an autobiographical account of part of his life, in particular his time in opal mining in Lightning Ridge.
