= The Desert Column =

1932 book by Ion Idriess

- First edition cover design
- Author: Ion Idriess
- Language: English
- Genre: War memoir
- Publisher: Angus and Robertson
- Publication date: 1932
- Publication place: Australia

The Desert Column: Leaves from the Diary of an Australian Trooper in Gallipoli, Sinai and Palestine is a book by Ion Idriess based on a diary he kept of his service during World War I.

== Background ==
Idriess kept a diary from the time he arrived on Gallipoli on 18 May 1915 until March 1918. He participated in the Gallipoli Campaign where he was wounded, then later fought in the Sinai and Palestine Campaign including the Battle of Beersheeba.

When Idriess returned from the war he put his diaries with his sister in Grafton. In 1929, when he was diagnosed with cancer, he gave up his wandering to concentrate on his writing. He retrieved his diaries, which were acclaimed by some observers as Australia's equivalent to All Quiet on the Western Front. (He later also claimed his sister sent the diaries to Angus and Robertson for publication without his knowledge.)

They were published in 1932 with Sir Harry Chauvel writing the introduction.

The Desert Column was one of his very early works. Sir Henry Georges Fauvel, a senior officer of the Australian Imperial Force noted in the foreword that it was the only book of the campaign that to his knowledge was ‘viewed entirely from the private soldier’s point of view’.

Idriess' original diaries are kept in the research collection of the Australian War Memorial.

== Reception ==
It went into a second edition within a week of publication.
