= Tracks of Destiny =

Book by Ion Idriess

- First edition
- Author: Ion Idriess
- Language: English
- Genre: travel
- Publisher: Angus and Robertson
- Publication date: 1961
- Publication place: Australia
- Pages: 228

Tracks of Destiny is a 1961 travel book by Ion Idriess.
