= Must Australia Fight? =

- First edition
- Author: Ion Idriess
- Language: English
- Genre: non-fiction
- Publisher: Angus and Robertson
- Publication date: 1939
- Publication place: Australia

Must Australia Fight? is a 1939 book by Ion Idriess. It dealt with whether Australia was prepared for invasion. In particular, it focuses on what might happen if the British fleet were not able to come to Australia's assistance.
