= Our Living Stone Age =

Book by Ion Idriess

- Author: Ion Idriess
- Language: English
- Publisher: Angus and Robertson
- Publication date: 1963
- Publication place: Australia

Our Living Stone Age is a 1963 book by Ion Idriess about Australia aboriginals.

== Our Stone Age Mystery ==
Our Stone Age Mystery
- Author: Ion Idriess
- Language: English
- Publisher: Angus and Robertson
- Publication date: 1964
- Publication place: Australia

Our Stone Age Mystery is a 1964 sequel to Our Living Stone Age.
