= Isles of Despair =

1947 novel by Ion Idriess

- First edition cover
- Author: Ion Idriess
- Language: English
- Genre: historical novel
- Publisher: Angus and Robertson
- Publication date: 1947
- Publication place: Australia

Isles of Despair is a 1947 historical novel by Ion Idriess based on the true story of Barbara Thomson, a white woman who was the sole survivor of a shipwreck and was raised by Coral Sea islanders, before being rescued in 1849.

It had a follow-up, The Wild White Man of Badu.

== Critical reception ==
A reviewer in The Western Herald newspaper noted that, although this novel is based on an historic incident, "first and foremost this is a story. It is told with the ease and vividness, the directness and feeling for drama that are the true requisites of the story-teller."
