= Gold Dust and Ashes =

Book by Ion Idriess

- First edition
- Author: Ion Idriess
- Language: English
- Publisher: Angus and Robertson
- Publication date: 1933
- Publication place: Australia

Gold Dust and Ashes is a book by Ion Idriess set in Bulolo in the New Guinea goldfields. It covers the history of gold exploration in the region, including occupation by the Germans, transfer to Australian governorship, the efforts of Cecil Levien to pioneer gold mining, and the role of New Guinea Airways in the industry.

In 1935-36 there was some discussion that the book would be filmed by Ken G. Hall for Cinesound. However no film resulted.
