= Joe Flick =

Indigenous Australian outlaw (c.1865–1889)

Joe Flick (c.1865 – 28 October 1889) was an Indigenous Australian outlaw famous for being one of the few people to have killed a Native Police officer. He also wounded Frank Hann in a shootout at Lawn Hill Station in the colony of Queensland.

== Early life ==
It appears that Flick was born in the Mehi River region of northern New South Wales around the year 1865. His father was Henry (Harry) Flick, a German-Australian stockman who worked at the Mungyer property near Mallowa. His mother was an Aboriginal woman, who was probably of the Gamilaraay people.

Due to his mixed Aboriginal heritage, Joe Flick was judged by colonial Australian society to be a half-caste or yellow boy, derogatory terms designed to belittle his worth as a human based upon his darker skin. Despite the social stigma, Flick was accepted as a legitimate son by his father and spent at least part of his childhood on Mungyer Station where he was taught how to be a stockman. At the age of 13, Flick was injured by a horse while mustering on the property, resulting in a broken femur. He was treated at the hospital in Narrabri, where he made a good recovery.

== Move to Queensland ==
Around 1880, Harry Flick took his Aboriginal wife and Joe north with him to the colony of Queensland, where they found work near Charleville, with Harry's wife presenting herself as a stockman. Harry soon assaulted and abducted an Aboriginal "half-caste" girl named Lizzie from the Mangalore homestead belonging to William Jenkins. Local policeman later caught Harry. He was found guilty of assault and sentenced to six months hard labour at the jail in Roma. Joe, who was around the age of 15 when this happened, was placed in the care of police at Charleville while his father was incarcerated.

In the early 1880s, after being released from prison, Harry Flick took his son Joe further north where they found employment on the Lawn Hill Station property of pioneer pastoralist Frank Hann. By this stage, Joe Flick had become an expert horseman, an excellent marksman and was well regarded in the region as a good worker.

== Arrest for attempted murder ==
However, in April 1888, trouble again occurred over the possession of another Aboriginal girl who went by the name of Kitty. While journeying to Burketown for supplies, a quarrel over Kitty happened at the Beames Brook Hotel which resulted in Joe Flick firing a shot at the hotel's proprietor James Cashman which narrowly missed him. Cashman made a complaint to the police, and Flick later gave himself up to Constable Henry Hasenkamp. Flick was arrested and sent to the jail at Normanton to await trial. However, when he found out that he would be tried for attempted murder, Flick made his escape over the prison wall.

== Escape and re-arrest in the Northern Territory ==
Flick stole some horses and made his escape hundreds of kilometres to the west into the Northern Territory which was then a frontier part of South Australia. Flick knew some of frontiersmen establishing grazing properties there and thought he could lay low out of trouble as an anonymous stockman. Conflict between the British colonists and the local Aboriginal people was ongoing at the time of Flick's escape and while travelling through the Gulf Country he had a skirmish with the Aborigines in which he was slightly injured.

Eventually he arrived at Hodgson Downs Station along the Hodgson River. The manager, James Crawford, allowed him to work as a stockman there. However, officers of the local mounted Native Police soon heard of Flick hiding out and in March 1889, a patrol led by Constable Robert Stott took him into custody at Hodgson Downs. Flick was chained with heavy irons and was led to Palmerston to be formally arrested. On the journey, Flick attempted to escape at Mount McMinn but was shot in the back and wounded by Stott before being recaptured.

Flick was held in remand at Fannie Bay Gaol in Palmerston until July 1889 when he was extradited to Queensland to face trial for the attempted murder of James Cashman. Constable Hasenkamp escorted Flick on a ship back to Normanton where he was again placed in jail awaiting trial.

== Fugitive after second escape ==
With the aid of an accomplice who somehow was able to provide him with a small saw-blade, Flick was able to cut through the timber floor of his cell at the Normanton jail and escape. He acquired a horse and some firearms and headed toward Turn Off Lagoon on the Nicholson River where there was a Native Police barracks. Flick knew that the officer and the Aboriginal troopers at the barracks would be used to track him down, so he went there and stole and shot their horses, and intimidated the troopers before fleeing to the south.

== Shootout at Lawn Hill ==
The Native Police officer at Turn Off Lagoon, Senior Constable Alfred Wavell, was able to procure some fresh horses and tracked Flick to Frank Hann's Lawn Hill station on 27 October 1889. On seeing the troopers, Flick shot one of their horses and under fire, fled to the dining hut located next to the homestead. Hann had been out the last few days hunting down "the blacks" who lived on what he regarded as his property. Consequently, he had lots of ammunition stored on site, and in the dining hut where Flick had now barricaded himself was around 250 cartridge rounds.

Wavell and his troopers then surrounded the hut. With his revolver in hand, Wavell approached the hut, but Flick was following his moments and with a single shot, hit Wavell in the chest, killing him instantly. Hann then called on Flick to surrender to which Flick responded that he would if Hann came up to the door of the hut. As soon as Hann opened the door, Flick shot him through shoulder. The wounded Hann, tried to shoot Flick but missed. Flick retreated to the hut, while Hann painfully made his way back to where the troopers were positioned. He then ordered the troopers to riddle the hut with bullets, which they continued to do for most of the rest of the afternoon.

In the evening, Hann ordered a ceasefire to see if Flick was dead, but a storm came up which provided cover for Flick to escape from the hut. On the following morning, the troopers searched the hut but only found a lot of Flick's blood. They tracked his trail of blood to a creek bank that was covered in tall grass. The troopers with Hann's "black boy" named Nym went to enter the grass, but Flick was waiting and shot Nym fatally through chest. Again Hann ordered the general bombardment of the area with rifle-fire which lasted for the rest of the day. One of the troopers claimed to have shot Flick through the head, but couldn't be sure. Hann then ordered the grass to be set alight to remove the cover and smoke Flick out if he was still alive.

== Death ==
Hann and the troopers watched the area around the creek all night but nothing of Flick was heard or seen. The next morning, they found that the fire had cleared most of the grass, Flick's dead corpse was soon located, riddled with bullet-holes. He was buried on the spot where he was found.

Flick's grave at Lawn Hill is marked by an iron framework. Nearby are the graves of Alfred Wavell and Nym, each with neatly carved headstones.

== Legacy ==
Joe Flick is regarded as one of the last great bushrangers and is a significant figure in that he was an Aboriginal man who killed an officer of the Native Police, a force which killed thousands of Indigenous people. His story has been made into two notable semi-fictional novels; Man Tracks by Ion Idriess and Outlaw by Greg Barron.

== See also ==
- List of Indigenous Australian historical figures
