= The Wild North (short story collection) =

1960 short story collection by Ion Idriess

- First edition
- Author: Ion Idriess
- Language: English
- Genre: short story collection
- Publisher: Angus and Robertson
- Publication date: 1960
- Publication place: Australia
- Pages: 229

The Wild North is a 1960 short story collection by Ion Idriess.

The collection contains 24 short stories and sketches about Cape York, some of which were written early in Idriess' career.
