= Outlaws of the Leopolds =

Book by Ion Idriess

- First edition
- Author: Ion Idriess
- Language: English
- Genre: history
- Publisher: Angus and Robertson
- Publication date: 1952
- Publication place: Australia

Outlaws of the Leopolds is a 1952 non-fiction history book by Ion Idriess. It concerned the aboriginal resistance leader Sandamara in the 1890s.

== Reception ==
The Adelaide News said "Idriess has handled his facts with imagination, has tried to interpret the native mind and outlook as well as the white. The result, is an interesting addition to the colorful history of the outback."

The Melbourne Herald declared "Just as there are batsmen who know nothing of footwork and style but can still connect with the ball, there are authors whose prose needs sandpapering, but who have their following as storytellers. Idriess fanciers are likely to be well content with his latest burst of tension and sudden death in the ranges."

The Sydney Morning Herald said "Even the most generous critic would have difficulty in maintaining that Jack Idriess is a literary stylist. His prose often gives the impression of having been shaped with a blunt adze rather than with the knife-edge of self-critical judgment. But the success of his many books... shows he has something that, within the limits of the stories he chooses to write, is a fair substitute for style: he is an honest reporter, with a keen eye for dramatic incident, and he knows his backgrounds intimately. In this book, anyway, the extraordinary drama of the real life theme transcends literary deficiences."

The Age declared Idriess gave the story "vitality in thrilling, free-moving narrative, that is sometimes crude, but never tedious."

The Bulletin said "Idriess again demonstrates his ability to put flesh on the skeleton and bring it to life."

== Film version ==
Producers Jon Noble and Alex McPhee spent several years trying to turn the book into a film. In the mid 1970s Noble made a documentary of the story.
