= Stone of Destiny =

Stone of Destiny may refer to:

== Monuments ==
- Stone of Scone, the coronation stone of Scottish monarchs
- Lia Fáil (Stone of Destiny), a monolithic stone in Ireland
- Pedra fadada (Stone of Destiny), stone that Goídel Glas chose as his seat in Hispania

== Media ==
- Stone of Destiny (book), 1940 book by Ion Idriess
- "Stone of Destiny", a 2001 musical composition by Maurice Lennon
- Stone of Destiny (2008 film), a film directed by Charles Martin Smith
- Stone of Destiny (2025 film), a short animation film
