= Flynn of the Inland =

Book by Ion Idriess

- First edition cover design
- Author: Ion Idriess
- Language: English
- Genre: biography
- Publisher: Angus and Robertson
- Publication date: 1932
- Publication place: Australia

Flynn of the Inland is a biography by Ion Idriess of John Flynn, founder of the Royal Flying Doctor Service.

It was one of his most successful books.
