= Across the Nullarbor =

Book by Ion Idriess

- First edition
- Author: Ion Idriess
- Language: English
- Genre: travel
- Publisher: Angus and Robertson
- Publication date: 1951
- Publication place: Australia

Across the Nullarbor is a 1951 book by Ion Idriess. It was based on a trip he took across the Nullarbor Plain.
