= Onward Australia =

1944 book by Ion Idriess

- First edition
- Author: Ion Idriess
- Language: English
- Genre: non-fiction
- Publisher: Angus and Robertson
- Publication date: 1944
- Publication place: Australia

Onward Australia is a 1944 book by Ion Idriess which proposes how Australia could be developed. It was part of the Battle for Australia series.
