= The Wild White Man of Badu =

Book by Ion Idriess

- First edition
- Author: Ion Idriess
- Language: English
- Genre: adventure
- Publisher: Angus and Robertson
- Publication date: 1950
- Publication place: Australia
- Pages: 232
- Preceded by: Isles of Despair

The Wild White Man of Badu is a 1950 novel by Ion Idriess. It was his 33rd book. The novel is allegedly based on a true story.

Wongai, a convict on Norfolk Island, steals a boat from an American ship with four other convicts. They travels to Badu Island on the Torres Strait, during the course of which Wongai and one convict kill and eat the other three, then Wongai kills the fourth convict. Wongai becomes a chief. He hears about the presence of a white woman on one of the islands, Barbara Thomson, and contemplates kidnapping her. (She was the subject of an earlier Idriess' novel Isles of Despair.) Eventually it is rumoured he is killed.

== Reception ==
The Adelaide Advertiser book critic felt the story was "mostly concerned with intertribal fights and massacres, murders and attempted murders, and Wongai's struggles against the wiles of the jealous witch doctors." They argued that at first "the book carries the interest and stirs the imagination, but the powers of the author then seem to falter and the end (there really is no end) is limping, inconclusive, and disappointing to a degree." The reviewer stated "the book is an adventure yarn founded on rather slim facts, of almost bloodcurdling intensity."

The Sun thought "Idriess over-writes at times but it does not prevent this book being an exciting adventure."

The Newcastle Morning Herald wrote "Wongai is founded on fact and, with the assistance of Ion Idriess's powerful imagination, he makes a fascinating story. At the end of the book, the white chief, shorn of all his glory, is still alive, and the author gives warning, or hope, depending on the readers' point of view, that there is ample scope for sequel."
