= The Great Boomerang =

Book by Ion Idriess

- 1949 edition
- Author: Ion Idriess
- Language: English
- Genre: non-fiction
- Publisher: Angus and Robertson
- Publication date: 1941
- Publication place: Australia

The Great Boomerang is a 1941 non-fiction book by Ion Idriess.

It contains his plans for developing the north of Australia. Idriess proposed diverting rivers from Queensland to create an inland sea.
