= Madman's Island =

Book by Ion Idriess

- First edition cover design
- Author: Ion Idriess
- Language: English
- Genre: novel
- Publisher: Cornstalk Publishing
- Publication date: 1927
- Publication place: Australia

Madman's Island is a 1927 novel by Ion Idriess set in northern Australia.

It was Idriess' first novel and was semi-autobiographical, although he invented the love interest at the insistence of the publisher.

== Plot ==
Jack Burnett decides to go prospecting on an uninhabited island in the Barrier Reef with a friend. The friend goes mad and tries to kill Jack. Jack discovers some opium stashed away by Japanese smugglers. Jack is rescued and sells the opium to a Chinese merchant in Cooktown.

In Cairns, Jack runs into the Japanese smugglers, but manages to escape with the help of a woman he has fallen in love with.

== Background ==
The book was based on a true incident that happened to Idriess. In 1923 he was marooned on Howick Island in Queensland with a friend he had gone prospecting with. The friend had a war injury which sent him mad and he tried to kill Idriess.

Idriess kept a diary of his time on the island and used it as the basis for the book. He sold it to a publisher in 1925.

Idriess fictionalised the story, including a subplot about opium smuggling.

== Reception ==
The book was not received particularly well.

== 1938 edition ==
Madman's Island
- First edition cover design
- Author: Ion Idriess
- Language: English
- Genre: non-fiction
- Publisher: Angus and Robertson
- Publication date: 1938
- Publication place: Australia

Idriess rewrote the book after he had achieved acclaim with his other writings. He removed the fictional elements and instead revised it as a memoir. It was republished in 1938 and was a large success, selling 70,000 copies.

== Radio adaptation ==
ABC Weekly 16 August 1941

The novel was serialised for radio in 1941, the first time one of his books was so adapted, and on which it was read by Ellis Price. It was adapted for radio again in 1949.
