= The Red Chief =

Book by Ion Idriess

- First edition
- Author: Ion Idriess
- Language: English
- Genre: historical novel
- Publisher: Angus and Robertson
- Publication date: 1953
- Publication place: Australia

The Red Chief: As Told By the Last of His Tribe is a 1953 book by Ion Idriess about Gambu Ganuurru or Red Kangaroo, a tribal leader in the Gunnedah region in the 18th century prior to European settlement.

== Plot ==
The young warrior Red Kangaroo becomes a chief of his tribe – the Red Chief of the Gunnedah district. His story is handed down through the generations of his tribe and given by the last survivor, Bungaree, to the white settlers of the district.

== Background ==
Bungaree reportedly told the story of the Red Chief to a police officer, Senior Sgt John Ewing in the early 19th century. Notes of this talk were taken by Ewin's son Stan and wound up in the possession of a historian, who sent them to Idriess, who decided to write the book.

== Reception ==
The Melbourne Argus said "There is always danger in trying to sentimentalise a savage, it leaves the reader with a double standard. Red Kangaroo's code, in the matter of homicide, pillage and wife-stealing is very different from ours, and his mental processes would be more realistic if they were not so close to those of a typical member of a junior chamber of commerce."

The Bulletin said "the aboriginal lore and the awkward reconstruction of tribal life soon give way to a really excellent yarn that redeems the whole book —it is worth waiting for. This is the story of Red Kangaroo’s winning himself a wife —or, rather, two wives...Mr. Idriess tells it with gusto and complete conviction.. Mr. Idriess has once more written his Christmas bestseller and at the same time has continued his invaluable services to the nation as an interpreter of the bush and the aborigines."

The book sold well.
