= Headhunters of the Coral Sea =

Book by Ion Idriess

- Original cover
- Author: Ion Idriess
- Language: English
- Genre: juvenile literature
- Publisher: Angus and Robertson
- Publication date: 1940
- Publication place: Australia

Headhunters of the Coral Sea is a 1940 book by Ion Idriess about Jack Ireland and Will d'Oyly, two survivors of the 1834 wreck, the Charles Eaton.

Idriess had previously written a version of this story in Drums of Mer.
