= HMS Rattlesnake (1822) =

Atholl-class corvette of Royal Navy

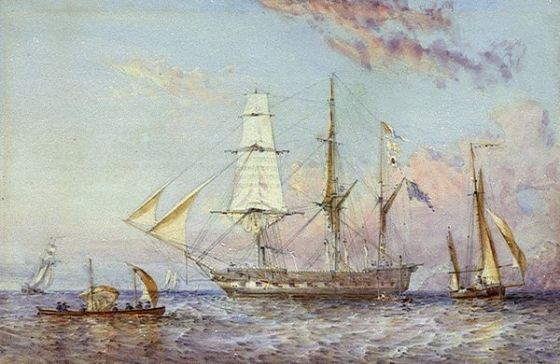
- Rattlesnake, painted by Sir Oswald Walters Brierly, 1853

History

United Kingdom
- Name: HMS Rattlesnake
- Ordered: 30 April 1818
- Builder: Chatham Dockyard
- Laid down: August 1819
- Launched: 26 March 1822
- Commissioned: 8 May 1824
- Reclassified: Troopship 1839; Survey vessel in 1845
- Fate: Broken up at Chatham in January 1860

General characteristics
- Class & type: Atholl-class 28-gun sixth-rate corvette
- Tons burthen: 499 91/94 bm
- Length: 113 ft 8 in (34.6 m) (gundeck); 94 ft 8 3/4 in (28.9 m) (keel)
- Beam: 31 ft 6 in (9.6 m)
- Depth of hold: 8 ft 9 in (2.67 m)
- Sail plan: Full-rigged ship
- Complement: 175
- Armament: Upper deck: 20 × 32-pdr (25cwt) carronades; Quarterdeck: 6 × 18-pdr carronades; Forecastle: 2 × 9-pdr guns

HMS Rattlesnake was an Atholl-class 28-gun sixth-rate corvette of the Royal Navy launched in 1822. She made a historic voyage of discovery to the Cape York and Torres Strait areas of northern Australia.

== Construction ==
Launched at Chatham Dockyard on 26 March 1822, Rattlesnake was 114 feet (34.7 m) long and 32 feet (9.7 m) abeam. She carried twenty 32-pounder carronades, six 18-pounder carronades and two 9-pounder long guns.

== Service in the Greek War of Independence ==
For most of the years 1827 to 1829 Rattlesnake was cruising off the coasts of Greece, under the command of Captain the Hon. Charles Orlando Bridgeman. During that period her log was kept by Midshipman Talavera Vernon Anson and survives in a collection at the New York Public Library. Both men went on to become admirals. On 31 January 1828, Rattlesnake was part of a force of five British and two French ships that attacked the Greek island of Gramvousa, used as a base for piracy. While most of the pirate's ships were destroyed by the Anglo-French force, the British frigate Cambrian ran aground after a collision with Isis and sank.

Sometime between 14 and 16 May 1830, Rattlesnake was driven ashore and damaged at Algiers in Ottoman Algeria. She was repaired and returned to service.

== Service in the East Indies and China Station ==
H.M.S. Rattlesnake and Bramble, 1852, by Oswald W. Brierly

Captain William Hobson was appointed command on 20 December 1834. Rattlesnake served in the Far East squadron, which was commanded by Admiral Sir Thomas Bladen Capel. In 1836, the Rattlesnake was ordered to Australia, arriving at Hobart on 15 August 1836 and in Sydney 23 August 1836 where 29 members of the 28th Regiment, 8 woman and 11 children disembarked. On 26 May 1837, the Rattlesnake sailed to the Bay of Islands, New Zealand, in response to a request for help from James Busby, the British Resident, who felt threatened by fighting between Māori tribes. In 1838 the Rattlesnake returned to England.

== Service in the First Anglo-Chinese War ==
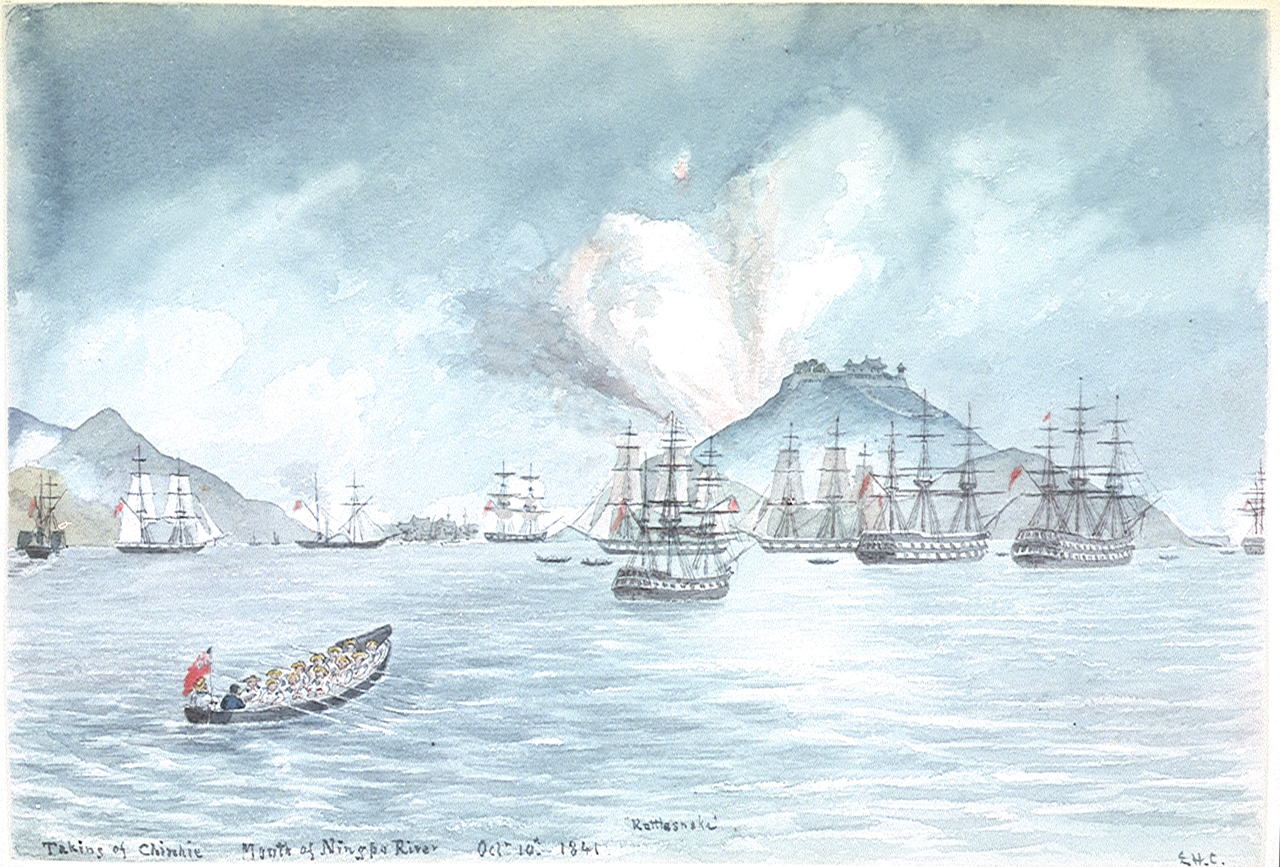
The capture of Chinhai on 10 October 1841, showing HMS Rattlesnake (centre)

Rattlesnake took part in the First Anglo-Chinese War (1839–42), known popularly as the First Opium War, taking part in the Capture of Chusan on 5–6 July 1840. During the period 1841–42 she was involved in actions off Canton in the fleet commanded by Sir William Parker in the First Anglo-Chinese War (1839–42), including the Battle of Chinhai on 10 October 1841 and the Yangtze river campaign in June–August 1842.

== Survey ship ==
She was converted to a survey ship in 1845.

== Australia and New Guinea ==
The captain on the voyage to northern Australia and New Guinea from 1846 to 1850 was Owen Stanley. Also aboard were John Thomson as Surgeon, Thomas Henry Huxley as Assistant Surgeon ("surgeon's mate", but in practice marine naturalist), John MacGillivray as botanist and Oswald Walters Brierly as artist. T. H. Huxley established his scientific reputation by the papers he wrote on this voyage, leading to his election as fellow of the Royal Society in 1851.

Rattlesnake was the ship that rescued Barbara Crawford Thompson, who had been shipwrecked on Prince of Wales Island, North Queensland, aged 13 in November 1844 and spent the next five years living with the local Kaurareg people.

== Fate ==
The ship was broken up at Chatham in January 1860.

== See also ==
- European and American voyages of scientific exploration
