= Collins Booksellers =

Australian book store chain

Collins Booksellers Pty Ltd

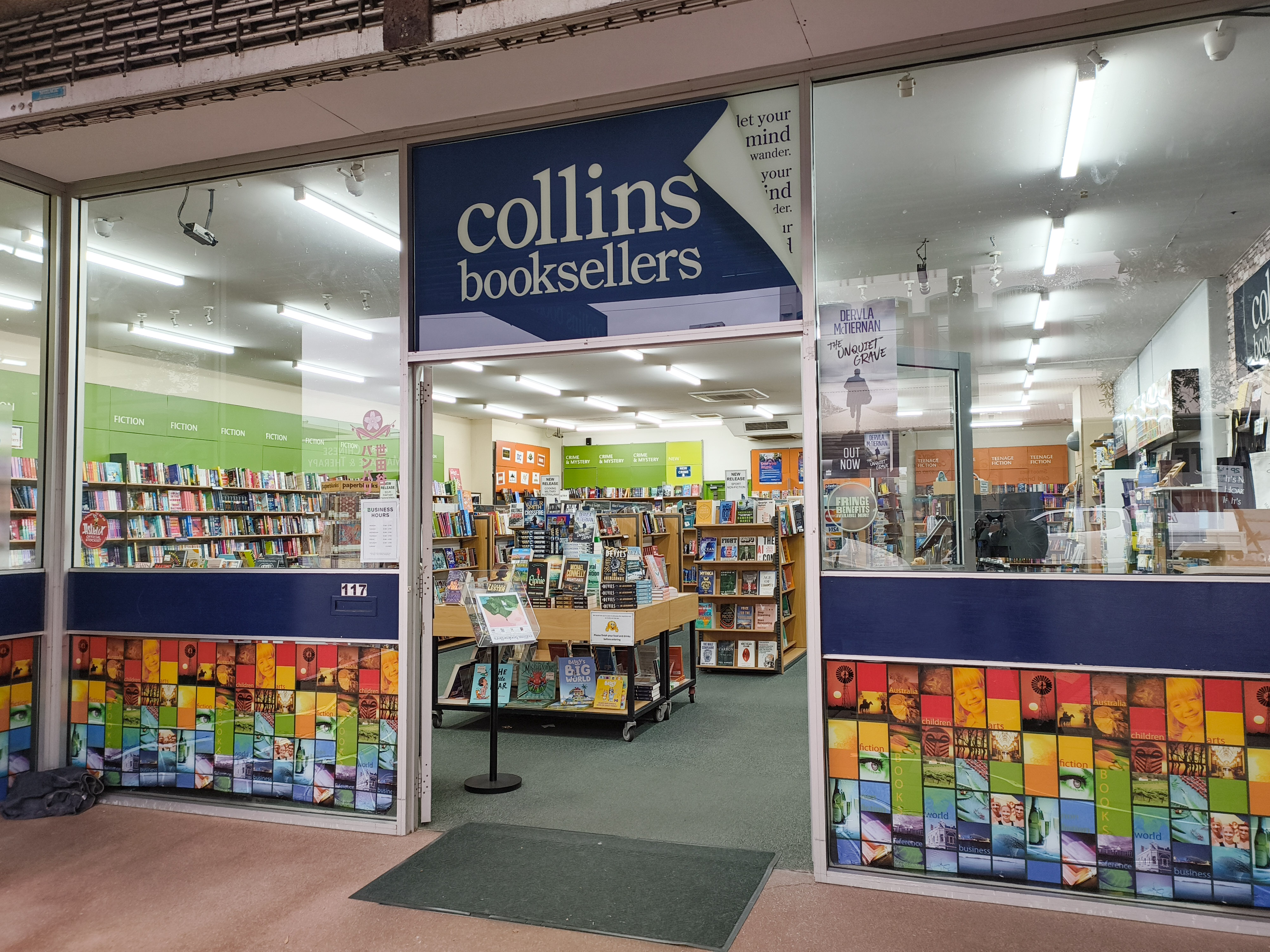
- Collins Booksellers store in Bunbury
- Type: Private
- Industry: Retail
- Founded: 1922
- Founder: Frederick Henry Slamen
- Headquarters: Melbourne, Australia
- Number of locations: 27 Collins stores and 2 Hill of Content stores
- Products: Books, DVDs & eReaders
- Website: collinsbooks.com.au

Collins Booksellers Pty Ltd is an Australian book store chain. It was founded in 1922 by Frederick Henry Slamen. The name Collins is from the original location of the first store, 622 Collins Street, Melbourne.

In 2020 the company consists of 24 franchised outlets under the brand name "Collins Booksellers" and 2 stores under the brand name "Hill of Content".

== History ==
The company was founded by Fredrick Slamen at 622 Collins St in 1922 as a newsagency. It expanded into books when Slamen attempted to purchase the Hill of Content bookstore, opened by A.H Spencer. He was outbid by Angus & Robertson, and instead bought the building, evicted Angus & Robertson, and opened his own bookstore on the site.

Slamen died in 1961, and his widow inherited the business. It expanded into publishing with Hill of Content Publishing, which published translations and original works.

During the 1970s, the chain expanded rapidly, opening stores in New South Wales, the Australian Capital Territory, Western Australia and Queensland. However, in the late 1970s, it began to transition to opening new stores under franchise agreements.

In 1988, it opened a 'super bookstore' in Sydney, and stores in Sydney and Melbourne airports followed. However, by the early 2000s, it had changed leadership teams, and relocated its head office. The company remained family owned until 2005, when it was placed into administration resulting in a franchisee buyout of 31 company owned stores.

In 2007, the chain acquired the troubled rival chain Book City. The combined chain had over 60 stores in Australia, along with 20 ABC Shops.

In April 2024, the Slamen family sold the freehold of the original Hill of Content store in Bourke St for $5.3 million. The Hill of Content bookstore would remain as tenant.
