= The Cattle King =

Book by Ion Idriess

- First edition
- Author: Ion Idriess
- Language: English
- Genre: biography
- Publisher: Angus and Robertson
- Publication date: 1936
- Publication place: Australia

The Cattle King is an Australian biography of Sidney Kidman.

Idriess researched and wrote it through 1935. It was difficult for him to write, in part due to lack of help from Kidman.

== Reception ==
It was one of Ion Idriess' best selling books.
