= Stone of Destiny (book) =

1948 book by Ion Idriess

- First edition
- Author: Ion Idriess
- Language: English
- Genre: non-fiction
- Publisher: Angus and Robertson
- Publication date: 1948
- Publication place: Australia

Stone of Destiny is a 1948 book by Ion Idriess about the Australian diamond industry.
