= Nemarluk =

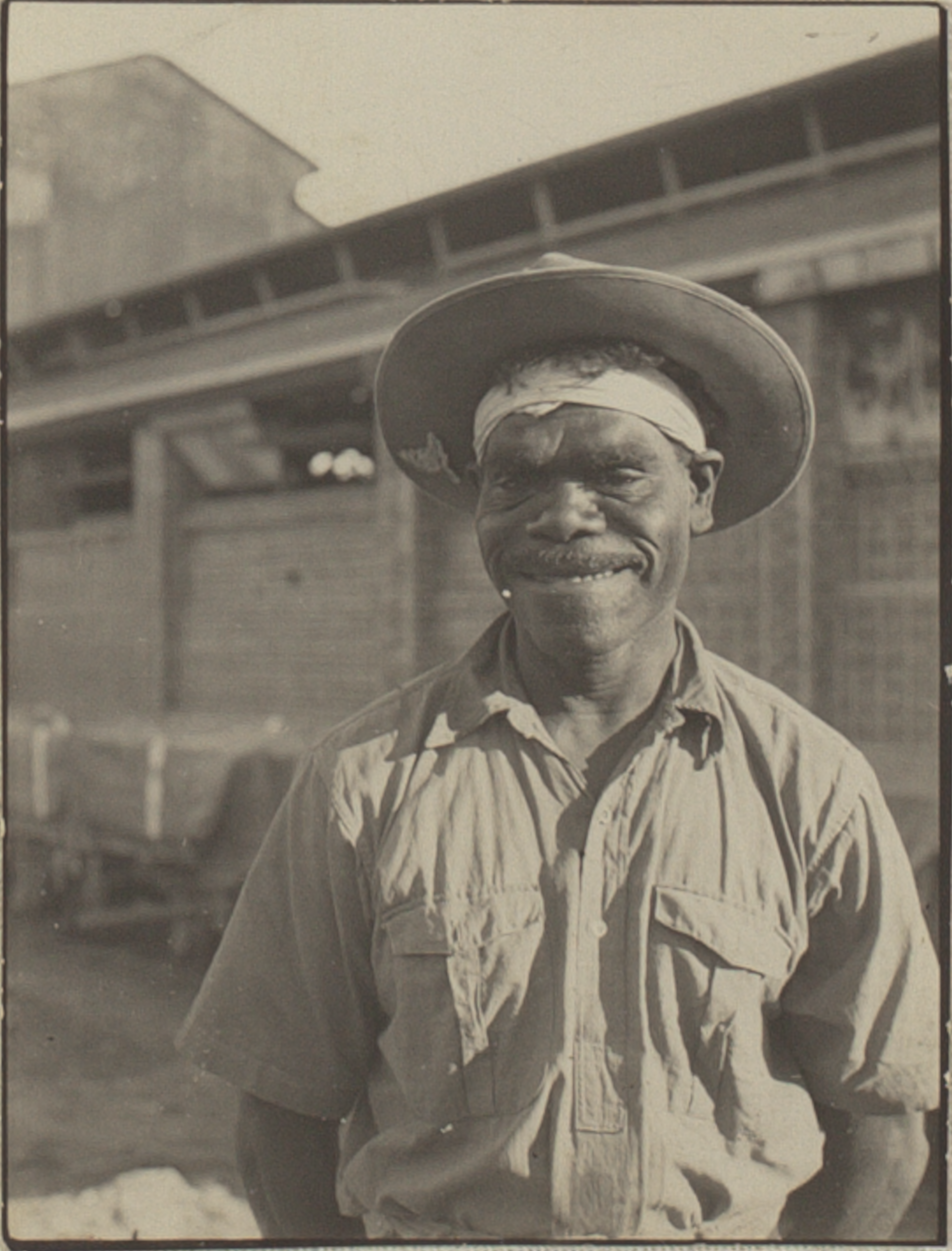
Nemarluk in Fannie Bay gaol.

Nemarluk (c. 1911 – August 1940) was an Murrinh-patha man, Aboriginal warrior and resistance leader who lived around present-day Darwin in the Northern Territory of Australia. He fought strongly against both British and Japanese intruders who had come into his people's tribal lands.

== Life ==
Reported to be 6 feet 2 inches tall, he was head man of the Chul-a-mar, the "Red Band of Killers". The men close to him and most loyal were Minmara, Mankee, Mangue and Lin. People of the area who knew him, described him at this time as being "proper fighting man and funny man". When fighting, the men were always painted red. Nemarluk and his followers lived and camped mainly on the Moyle Plain, and at the mouth of Port Keats (now Wadeye).

One of the most famous incidents concerning Nemarluk and his men was the killing of the Japanese crew of the lugger Ouida at Injin Beach, near Port Keats in 1933. In the 1930s, he was imprisoned in Darwin's Fannie Bay Gaol. He soon managed to break out, and made his escape by swimming eight kilometres across Darwin Harbour to the then-remote Cox Peninsula.

== Popular culture ==
Popular fiction writer Ion Idriess wrote about the last three years of Nemarluk's life in the book:

Idriess, Ion L. (Ion Llewellyn) (1941). Nemarluk: King of the Wilds. Angus and Robertson, Sydney.

This book focuses particularly on his battle against the tracker Bul-Bul, whom the Northern Territory Police had brought in to capture him.

The Ngan'gikurunggurr language version of this story is available at AIATSIS and the English translation of this is available online.

He also reportedly inspired the character Marbuck in the film Jedda (1955).

== Death ==
At some point in time, probably around 1940, Nemarluk became ill with pneumonia and was taken into town to hospital. There are many stories told about Nemarluk's death. It was reported that he died in hospital. Others say that he recovered and was let free in the general prisoner amnesty after the bombing of Darwin.

Nemarluk is commemorated in the Northern Territory as a street in the Darwin suburb of Ludmilla, an Aboriginal community near Wadeye, a locality shared between the local government areas of Victoria Daly Region and the West Daly Region, and a Darwin special education school.
