= Gambu Ganuurru =

19th century Indigenous Australian leader

Gambu Ganuurru (or Cumbo Gunnerah in an older spelling), also known as the Red Chief, or Red Kangaroo was a Kamilaroi (Gamilaraay) man who lived in the area that is now the town of Gunnedah in north-west New South Wales in the 18th century.

He had a reputation as a warrior and leader of the Gunn-e-darr people.

== Burial ==
Gambu Ganuurru died around 1845, and was buried in a manner befitting a Kamilaroi man of great importance; in a sitting position, backed by a tree carved with totemic designs. The stories of his bravery, achievements and adventures were handed down through the generations and his burial place was treated with great respect.

In 1887 the town's doctor arranged for the remains of Gambu Ganuurru to be dug up, and later sent them, along with a section of what was locally known as The Blackfellow's Tree, to the Australian Museum. In the 1950s the museum was asked where his remains and the tree section were, but it could not find them.

== Legacy ==
As custom demanded his silence, "Old Joe" Bungaree (born ca. 1817), a man considered to be the last full-blooded Aboriginal person of the Gunn-e-darr tribe, was unwilling to talk about his former leader. Just before he died he confided in his friend, John P Ewing, the local police sergeant. The sergeant's son Stan Ewing (1878–1938) recorded this information and passed it on to other historians. Gambu Ganuurru soon became recognised as a great Aboriginal leader, his story appearing in The Sydney Mail in 1891.

Writer Ion Idriess wrote The Red Chief first published in 1953, which became a best-seller of its day. The tag 'Red Chief' was coined by Idriess; it is not used in the source documents.

In the 1960s, the Gunnedah Historical Society erected a sign to mark the burial site of "The Red Chief". This sign still stands on the footpath near the corner of Abbott and Little Conadilly Streets.

In 1984, a sculpture, designed by Dennis Adams in consultation with local Aboriginal people and the NSW National Parks & Wildlife Service was erected to mark the burial site. It was opened on National Aborigines' Day, 14 September, and officially dedicated by one of the oldest members of the local Aboriginal community, John Lalor.

The bronze relief text reads:

Yilambu giwihr gayir Kambu Gunirah gir ginyi.
Ngihrngu mari ngihrma gayir Gaweh Canuhr.
Ngihrma binal wuraya, wahrunggul yiliyan
maringu Gunidahngu ginyi.
Yirahla ganu wunda dawandah nahbu gayir
gaweh Gawinbara Wuraya.

In times past there was an Aboriginal man
called Cumbo Gunnerah
His people called him The Red Kangaroo.
He was a clever chief and a mighty fighter
(this man from Gunnedah)
Later, the white people of this place
called him The Red Chief.

Dr Margaret Sharpe, lecturer in Aboriginal Languages, wrote the Kamilaroi text.
