= The Opium Smugglers =

1948 book by Ion Idriess

- First edition
- Author: Ion Idriess
- Language: English
- Genre: non-fiction
- Publisher: Angus and Robertson
- Publication date: 1948
- Publication place: Australia

The Opium Smugglers is a 1948 book by Ion Idriess. It was one of a number of books he wrote for children.
