= Over the Range (Idriess book) =

1937 book by Ion Idriess

- First edition
- Author: Ion Idriess
- Language: English
- Genre: travel
- Publisher: Angus and Robertson
- Publication date: 1937
- Publication place: Australia

Over the Range: Sunshine and Shadow in the Kimberley is a 1937 book by Ion Idriess about life in the Kimberley region in Western Australia.

Idriess records his experiences while accompanying a Nor'-west Mounted Police Patrol for twelve hundred miles through the Kimberleys, north of the Wunaamin-Miliwundi Ranges. Between 1879 and 2020 the ranges were known as King Leopold Ranges.

== Reception ==
Ten thousand copies were sold in the first ten days, establishing an Australian record.
