= Bibliography of Australian history =

This is a bibliography of selected publications on the history of Australia.

== Reference books ==
- Barker, Anthony. What Happened When: A Chronology of Australia from 1788. Allen & Unwin. 2000.
- Bambrick, Susan ed. The Cambridge Encyclopedia of Australia (1994)
- Basset, Jan. The Oxford Illustrated Dictionary of Australian History (1998)
- Davison, Graeme; Hirst, John; Macintyre, Stuart (2001). The Oxford Companion to Australian History. ISBN 978-0195515039. online at OUP
- Day, Alan. Historical Dictionary of the Discovery and Exploration of Australia. Scarecrow, 2003. 321 pp.
- Docherty, J. C. Historical Dictionary of Australia (2007) (2001);
- Galligan, Brian, and Winsome Roberts, eds. Oxford Companion to Australian Politics (2007); online at many academic libraries
- Lewis, Wendy; Balderstone, Simon; Bowan, John (2006). Events That Shaped Australia. New Holland. ISBN 978-1-74110-492-9.
- O'Shane, Pat et al. Australia: The Complete Encyclopedia (2001)
- Serle. Percival, ed. Dictionary of Australian Biography (1949) online edition
- Shaw, John, ed. Collins Australian Encyclopedia (1984)
- Taylor, Peter. The Atlas of Australian History (1991)
- The Year-book of the Imperial Institute of the United Kingdom, the colonies and India: a statistical record of the resources and trade of the colonial and Indian possessions of the British Empire (2nd. ed. 1893) 880pp; Australia = pp 521–718 online edition

== Surveys ==
- Atkinson, Alan. The Europeans in Australia: A History. Vol. 2: Democracy. (2005). 440 pp.
- Basset, Jan. The Oxford Illustrated Dictionary of Australian History (1998)
- Bolton, Geoffrey. The Oxford History of Australia: Volume 5: 1942–1995. The Middle Way (2005)
- Clark, Manning. A History of Australia 6 vol (Melbourne University Press, 1962, 1968, 1973, 1978, 1981, and 1987)
- Clarke, Frank G. The History of Australia (2002).
- Day, David. Claiming a Continent: A New History of Australia (2001);
- Hughes, Robert. The Fatal Shore: The Epic of Australia’s Founding (1988).
- Kingston, Beverley. The Oxford History of Australia: Volume 3: 1860–1900 Glad, Confident Morning (1993)
- Kociumbas, Jan. The Oxford History of Australia: Volume 2: 1770–1860 Possessions (1995)
- Macintyre, Stuart. The Oxford History of Australia: Volume 4: 1901–42, the Succeeding Age (1993)
- Macintyre, Stuart. A Concise History of Australia (2nd. ed. 2009)
- Schreuder, Deryck, and Stuart Ward, eds. Australia's Empire (Oxford History of the British Empire Companion Series) (2008)
- Welsh, Frank. Australia: A New History of the Great Southern Land (2008)

== Journals ==
- Australian Cultural History (last issue volume 28, 2–3, 2010)
- Australian Economic History Review
- Australian Historical Studies
- Australian Journal of Politics and History
- History Australia
- Journal of Australian Colonial History
- Journal of the Royal Australian Historical Society

== Specialty studies ==
- Alomes, Stephen. A Nation at Last? The Changing Character of Australian Nationalism (1988)
- Atkinson, Alan. The Europeans in Australia: A History. Vol. 2: Democracy. Oxford U. Pr., 2005. 440 pp.
- Thomas Brassey, 2nd Earl Brassey (1904). "Studies in Australia in 1896: Paper read at the Royal Colonial Institute, February, 1897.". Problems of Empire: 197–232. Wikidata Q107160240.
- Crowley; F. K. Australia's Western Third: A History of Western Australia from the First Settlements to Modern Times (1960)
- Davison, Graeme; Hirst, John; Macintyre, Stuart (2001). The Oxford Companion to Australian History. ISBN 978-0195515039. online at OUP
- Day, David. Reluctant Nation: Australia and the Allied Defeat of Japan 1942–45 (1992),
- Goodall, Heather. Invasion to Embassy: Land in Aboriginal Politics in New South Wales, 1770–1972 (Allen&Unwin, 1996)
- Edwards, John. Curtin's Gift: Reinterpreting Australia's Greatest Prime Minister, (2005)
- Hughes, Robert. The Fatal Shore: The Epic of Australia’s Founding (1988).
- Keith, Arthur Berriedale (1921). War government of the British dominions. Clarendon Press. "Australia.", First World War
- Kingston, Beverley. The Oxford History of Australia: Volume 3: 1860–1900 Glad, Confident Morning (1993)
- Kociumbas, Jan. The Oxford History of Australia: Volume 2: 1770–1860 Possessions (1995)
- Lowe, David. Menzies and the 'Great World Struggle': Australia's Cold War 1948–54 (1999)
- Macintyre, Stuart. The Oxford History of Australia: Volume 4: 1901–42, the Succeeding Age (1993)
- Macintyre, Stuart. A Concise History of Australia (2004)
- McLachlan, Noel. Waiting for the Revolution: A History of Australian Nationalism (1989)
- Martin, A. W. Robert Menzies: A Life (2 vol 1993–99), online at ACLS e-books
- Reynolds, Henry. The Other Side of the Frontier: Aboriginal Resistance to the European Invasion of Australia (1990).
- Ward, Smart. Australia and the British Embrace: The Demise of the Imperial Ideal (2001)

== Recent political history (since 1939) ==
- Aulich, Chris, ed. From Abbott to Turnbull: A New Direction? (Echo, 2016)
- Bolton, Geoffrey. The Oxford History of Australia: Volume 5: 1942–1995. The Middle Way (2005)
- Edwards, John. Curtin's Gift: Reinterpreting Australia's Greatest Prime Minister, (2005)
- Evans, Mark et al. eds. From Turnbull to Morrison: Understanding the Trust Divide (2019)
- Kelly, Paul. The End of Certainty: Power, Politics & Business in Australia (2008); originally published as The End of Certainty: The Story of the 1980s (1994)
- McDougall, Derek. "From Malcolm Turnbull to ScoMo: crisis for the centre-right in Australia." The Round Table 107.5 (2018): 557-570.
- Manning, Paddy. Born to rule: the unauthorised biography of Malcolm Turnbull (Melbourne Univ. Publishing, 2015).
- Martin, A. W. Robert Menzies: A Life (2 vol 1993–99), online at ACLS e-books
- Megalogenis, George. The Longest Decade (2nd ed. 2009), politics 1990–2008
- Moran, Anthony. Australia: Nation, Belonging, and Globalization (Routledge, 2004)
- Turnbull, Malcolm. Fighting for the Republic (Hardie Grant Books, 1999).
- Walsh, Mary, et al. The Revolving Door of Australian Prime Ministers (Melbourne University Press, 2019).
- Weinert, Kim D., and Kieran Tranter. "The empty centre: The Hollowmen and representations of techno-political elites in Australian public life." Entertainment and Sports Law Journal, (2020) 18: 11, pp. 1–9. DOI: https://doi.org/10.16997/eslj.268ESLJ online; argues that the 2008–2009 Australian Broadcasting Corporation (ABC) comedy "The Hollowmen" unveils an empty centre within the nation's public life.

== Diplomacy and military ==
- Australian War Memorial. Encyclopedia online with scores of topics
- Bou, Jean. Light Horse: A History of Australia's Mounted Arm (Australian Army History Series) (2009)
- Bridge, Carl ed., Munich to Vietnam: Australia's Relations with Britain and the United States since the 1930s, Melbourne University Press 1991
- Dennis, Peter, Jeffrey Grey, Ewan Morris, and Robin Prior. The Oxford Companion to Australian Military History. 1996)
- Firth, Stewart. Australia in International Politics: An Introduction to Australian Foreign Policy (2005)
- Grant, Ian. A Dictionary of Australian Military History – from Colonial Times to the Gulf War (1992)
- Gyngell; Allan, and Michael Wesley. Making Australian Foreign Policy (Cambridge University Press, 2003)
- Harper, Norman. A Great and Powerful Friend: A Study of Australian American Relations Between 1900-1975 (U of Queensland Press, 1987)
- Lee, David. Search for Security: The Political Economy of Australia's Postwar Foreign and Defence Policy (1995)
- Lowe, David. Menzies and the 'Great World Struggle': Australia's Cold War 1948–54 (1999)
- McLean, David. "From British Colony to American Satellite? Australia and the USA during the Cold War," Australian Journal of Politics & History (2006) 52 (1), 64–79. Rejects satellite model. online at Blackwell-Synergy
- McLean, David. "Australia in the Cold War: a Historiographical Review." International History Review (2001) 23(2): 299–321. ISSN 0707-5332
- Millar, T. B. Australia in peace and war : external relations 1788-1977 (1978) online, 612pp
- Murphy, John. Harvest of Fear: A History of Australia's Vietnam War (1993)
- Watt, Alan. The Evolution of Australian Foreign Policy 1938–1965, Cambridge University Press, 1967

=== Second World War ===
- "Second World War Official Histories" 22 vol 1952–77; online

==== Homefront ====
- Hasluck, Paul The Government and the People, 1939–41 (1965) online vol 1; The Government and the People, 1942–45 (1970) online vol 2
- Blum, Timothy. "Profits Over Patriotism: Black Market Crime in World War II Sydney." (2011). online
- Butlin, S.J. War Economy, 1939–42 (1955) online
- Butlin, S.J. and C.B. Schedvin, War Economy 1942–1945, (1977) online
- Darian-Smith, Kate. On the Home Front: Melbourne in Wartime, 1939–1945. Australia: Oxford UP, 1990.
- Fort, Carol. "Regulating the labour market in Australia's wartime democracy." Australian Historical Studies 34.122 (2003): 213–230.
- Goot, Murray. "Labor's 1943 landslide: Political market research, Evatt, and the public opinion polls." Labour History: A Journal of Labour and Social History 107 (2014): 149–166. in JSTOR
- McKernan, Michael. Australia During the Second World War: All In! (Nelson, 1983).
- Mellor, D.P. The Role of Science and Industry (1958) online
- Saunders, Kay. War on the Homefront: State Intervention in Queensland, 1938–1948 (1993)
- Saunders, Kay. "The dark shadow of white Australia: racial anxieties in Australia in World War II." Ethnic and Racial Studies 17#2 (1994): 325–341.
- Saunders, Kay. "‘The stranger in our gates’: Internment policies in the United Kingdom and Australia during the two world wars, 1914–39." Immigrants & Minorities 22#1 (2003): 22–43.
- Spear, Jonathan A. "Embedded: the Australian Red Cross in the Second World War." (2007). online
- Willis, Ian C. "The women's voluntary services, a study of war and volunteering in Camden, 1939–1945." (2004). online

== Economics, business and labour ==
- Bramble, Tom. Trade Unionism in Australia: A History from Flood to Ebb Tide (2008)
- Clark, Victor S. "Australian Economic Problems. I. The Railways," Quarterly Journal of Economics, Vol. 22, No. 3 (May, 1908), pp. 399–451 in JSTOR, history to 1907
- Collins, Jock, and Jock Collins. A shop full of dreams: Ethnic small business in Australia (Pluto Press Australia, 1995).
- Cooper, Rae, and Bradon Ellem. "The neoliberal state, trade unions and collective bargaining in Australia." British Journal of Industrial Relations 46.3 (2008): 532-554.
- Dyster, Barrie, and David Meredith. Australia in the global economy: continuity and change (Cambridge UP, 2012)
- Fleming, Grant, David Merrett, and Simon Ville. The big end of town: Big business and corporate leadership in twentieth-century Australia (Cambridge University Press, 2004), comprehensive history of corporate life since 1850s.
- Hearn, Mark, Harry Knowles, and Ian Cambridge. One Big Union: A History of the Australian Workers Union 1886–1994 (1998)
- Kirk, Neville. Labour and the Politics of Empire: Britain and Australia, 1900 to the Present(2011).
- Merrett, David T., and Simon Ville. "Financing growth: new issues by Australian firms, 1920–1939." Business History Review 83.3 (2009): 563-589. online
- Merrett, David, and Simon Ville. "Tariffs, Subsidies, And Profits: A Re-Assessment Of Structural Change In Australia 1901–39." Australian Economic History Review 51.1 (2011): 46-70. online
- Milton-Smith, John. "Business ethics in Australia and New Zealand." Journal of Business ethics 16.14 (1997): 1485-1497.
- Nielsen, James F., Chris Terry, and Rowan M. Trayler. "Business banking in Australia: a comparison of expectations." International Journal of Bank Marketing (1998).
- Panza, Laura, Simon Ville, and David Merrett. "The drivers of firm longevity: Age, size, profitability and survivorship of Australian corporations, 1901–1930." Business History 60.2 (2018): 157-177. online
- Rafferty, Mike, and Serena Yu. Shifting risk: work and working life in Australia: a report for the Australian Council of Trade Unions (University of Sydney, Workplace Research Centre, 2010) online.
- Ville, Simon, and David Tolmie Merrett. "Investing in a Wealthy Resource-Based Colonial Economy: International Business in Australia before World War I." Business History Review 94.2 (2020): 321-346. online
- Wright, Chris F., and Russell D. Lansbury. "Trade unions and economic reform in Australia, 1983–2013." Singapore Economic Review 59.04 (2014): online

== Culture, society, race, ethnicity, gender ==
- Arrow, Michelle. Friday on our minds: popular culture in Australia since 1945 (UNSW Press, 2009).
- Babatunde-Sowole, Olutoyin O., et al. "'Coming to a Strange Land' The West African Migrant Women’s Establishment of Home and Family in a New Culture Within Australia." Journal of Transcultural Nursing 27.5 (2016): 447-455. online
- Bennett, Bruce et al. The Oxford Literary History of Australia (1999)
- Bennett, Tony, and David Carter. Culture in Australia: Policies, Publics and Programs (2001)
- Carey, Hilary. Believing in Australia: A Cultural History of Religions (1996).
- Collins, Jock, and Jock Collins. A shop full of dreams: Ethnic small business in Australia (Pluto Press Australia, 1995).
- Crawford, Robert. "Selling modernity: advertising and the construction of the culture of consumption in Australia, 1900-1950." ACH: The Journal of the History of Culture in Australia 24-25 (2006).
- Fiske, John, Bob Hodge, and Graeme Turner. Myths of Oz: reading Australian popular culture (Routledge, 2016).
- Harris, Anita. "In a Girlie World: Tweenies in Australia." Counterpoints 245 (2005): 209-223. online
- Kapferer, Bruce. Legends of people, myths of state: violence, intolerance, and political culture in Sri Lanka and Australia (Berghahn Books, 2011).
- Kleinert, Sylvia. and Margo Neale. The Oxford Companion to Aboriginal Art and Culture (2001)
- Moran, Albert. Historical Dictionary of Australian Radio and Television (2007)
- O'Brien, Patricia. "Remaking Australia's Colonial Culture?: White Australia and its Papuan Frontier 1901–1940." Australian Historical Studies 40.1 (2009): 96-112.
- Peppard, Judith. "Culture wars in South Australia: the sex education debates." Australian Journal of Social Issues 43.3 (2008): 499-516.
- Rutland, Suzanne D. The Jews in Australia (Cambridge University Press, 2006).
- Schneider, Tanja, and Teresa Davis. "Advertising food in Australia: Between antinomies and gastro-anomy." Consumption, Markets and Culture 13.1 (2010): 31-41 online.
- Skinner, Natalie, and Barbara Pocock. "Work, life, flexibility and workplace culture in Australia: results of the 2008 Australian Work and Life Index (AWALI) Survey." Australian Bulletin of Labour 36.2 (2010): 133-154.
- Staniforth, Mark. Material culture and consumer society: dependent colonies in colonial Australia (Springer Science & Business Media, 2012).
- Stratton, Jon. Uncertain lives: Culture, race and neoliberalism in Australia (Cambridge Scholars Publishing, 2011).
- Ward, Stuart. "The “new nationalism” in Australia, Canada and New Zealand: Civic culture in the wake of the British world." in Britishness abroad: Transnational movements and imperial cultures (2007) pp: 231-36.
- Webby, Elizabeth, ed. The Cambridge Companion to Australian Literature (2006)

== Environment and geography ==
- Bolton, Geoffrey. Spoils and Spoilers: Australians Make Their Environment, 1788–1980 (Sydney, Allen & Unwin, 1981).
- Cathcart, Michael. The water dreamers: the remarkable history of our dry continent (2010) online review.
- Doyle, Timothy, and Tsarina Doyle. Green power: the environment movement in Australia (UNSW Press, 2000).
- Dunlap, Thomas R. Nature and the English Diaspora: Environment and History in the United States, Canada, Australia, and New Zealand (Studies in Environment and History) (1999)
- Frost, Lionel, and Seamus O'Hanlon. "Urban history and the future of Australian cities." Australian Economic History Review 49.1 (2009): 1-18. online
- Garden, Donald S., and Mark R. Stoll. Australia, New Zealand, and the Pacific: An Environmental History (Nature and Human Societies) (2005)
- Howes, Michael. Politics and the Environment: Risk and the Role of Government and Industry (Routledge, 2013) compares Britain, USA and Australia.
- Hutton, Drew, and Libby Connors. History of the Australian Environment Movement (1999)
- Lines, William J. Taming the Great South Land: A History of the Conquest of Nature in Australia (1999)
- Powell, J. M. Watering the Garden State: Water, Land and Community in Victoria 1834–1988 (Sydney, Allen & Unwin, 1989).
- Pyne, Stephen J. Burning Bush: A Fire History of Australia (Holt, 1991)
- Robin, Libby. "Australia in global environmental history" in A Companion to Global Environmental History Edited by J. R. McNeill and Erin Stewart Mauldin. (Wiley-Blackwell, 2012) pp 182–195.online.
- Robin, Libby. Defending the Little Desert: The Rise of Ecological Consciousness in Australia (Melbourne University Press, 1998).
- Rolls, E. They All Ran Wild: The Animals and Plants that Plague Australia (Angus and Robertson, 1969).
- Seddon, George. Landprints: Reflections on Place and Landscape (Melbourne, Cambridge U Press, 1997)
- Tranter, Bruce. "Environmental activists and non-active environmentalists in Australia." Environmental Politics 19.3 (2010): 413-429.
- Tranter, Bruce. "Leadership and change in the Tasmanian environment movement." Leadership Quarterly 20.5 (2009): 708-724 online
- Williams, Michael. The Making of the South Australian Landscape (Academic Press, 1974).
- Wright, R. The Bureaucrat ’s Domain: Space and the Public Interest in Victoria 1836–1884, (Melbourne, Oxford University Press, 1989).

== Historiography ==
- Attwood, Bain, and Fiona Magowan. Telling Stories: Indigenous History and Memory in Australia and New Zealand (2001)
- Bongiorno, Frank. "'Real Solemn History' and Its Discontents: Australian Political History and the Challenge of Social History," Australian Journal of Politics and History (2010) 56#1 pp 6+
- Bonnell, Andrew G. and Martin Crotty, "An Australian 'Historikerstreit'? Review Article," Australian Journal of Politics & History (2004) 50#3 pp 425–433
- Case, Jo. "Who Killed Australian History?" In History (6 March 2012) online
- Coombes, Annie E. Rethinking Settler Colonialism: History and Memory in Australia, Canada, New Zealand and South Africa (Studies in Imperialism) (2006)
- Davison, Graeme. The Use and Abuse of Australian History (2000)
- Gare, Deborah. "Britishness in recent Australian historiography." Historical Journal 43#4 (2000): 1145–1155.
- Hirst, John, and Stuart Macintyre, eds, The Oxford Companion to Australian History (Melbourne, 1998); many articles have a historiographical component
- McIntyre, Stuart. The History Wars (2nd ed. 2004) see History wars article
- McIntyre, Stuart, and Julian Thomas, eds, The Discovery of Australian History 1890–1939 (Carlton, Vic., 1995)
- McLean, David. "Australia in the Cold War: A Historiographical Review", The International History Review, Vol. 23, 2 (June 2001)
- McQueen, Humphrey. Gallipoli to Petrov: Arguing with Australian History (1984),
- Meaney, Neville. "Britishness and Australian Identity: The Problem of Nationalism in Australian History and Historiography", Australian Historical Studies, Vol. 32, 116 (April 2001),
- Nugent, Maria. Botany Bay: Where Histories Meet (2005)
- Waterhouse, Richard. "Locating the New Social History: transnational historiography and Australian local history", Journal of the Royal Australian Historical Society (2009) 95#1 pp. 1–17.

== Primary sources ==
- Kemp, Rod, and Marion Stanton, eds. Speaking for Australia: Parliamentary Speeches That Shaped Our Nation Allen & Unwin, 2004
- Crowley, Frank, ed. Modern Australia in documents, volume 1, 1901–1939 (1973); Modern Australia in Documents, 1939–1970 (1973). Wren Publishing, Melbourne. ISBN 978-0-85885-032-3.
