= Oswald Walters Brierly =

English painter (1817–1894)

Sir Oswald Walters Brierly
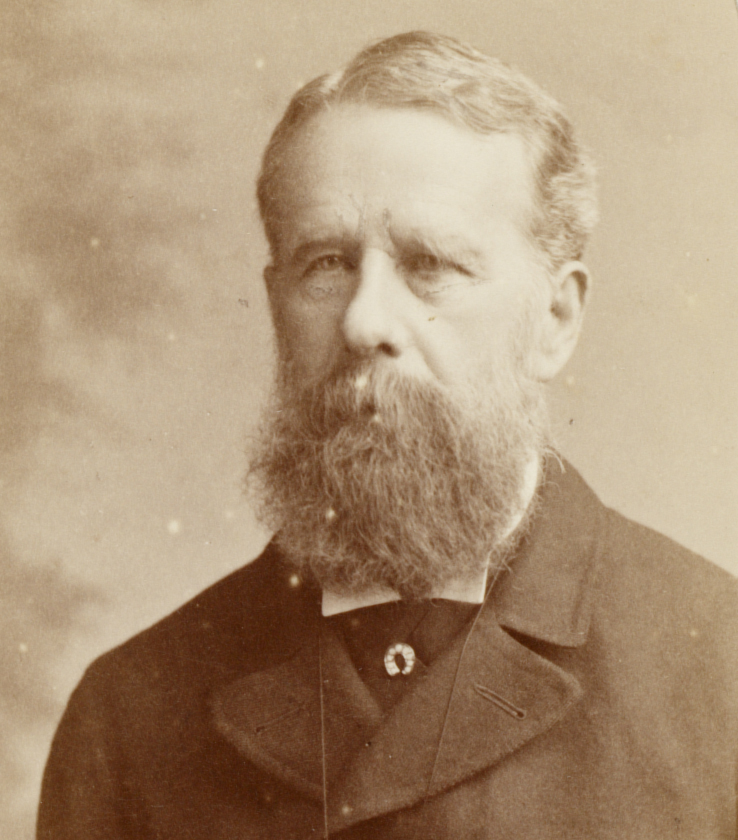
- Portrait of Oswald Walters Brierly, c.1880
- Born: 19 May 1817
- Died: 14 December 1894
- Movement: marine painting
- Awards: Marine-Painter to Queen Victoria.

Sir Oswald Walters Brierly (19 May 1817 – 14 December 1894), was an English marine painter from an old Cheshire family and he was born at Chester.

== Life ==
He was the son of Thomas Brierly, a medical doctor and amateur artist, who belonged to an old Cheshire family, was born at Chester on 19 May 1817. After a general grounding in art at the academy of Henry Sass in Bloomsbury, he went to Plymouth to study naval architecture and rigging. He exhibited drawings of two men-of-war at Plymouth, Pique and Gorgon, at the Royal Academy in 1839. He then spent some time in the study of navigation, and in 1841 started on a voyage to Australia with his friend Benjamin Boyd in the latter's yacht Wanderer.

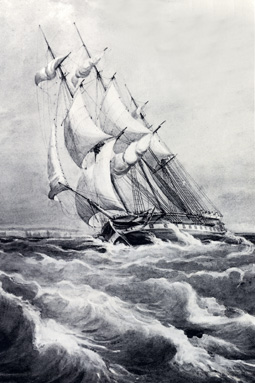
HMS Rattlesnake off Sydney Heads by Oswald Brierly c. 1849

Boyd established himself in New South Wales as a merchant banker, pastoralist, shipowner, whaler and member of parliament. Brierly lived in southern New South Wales in a new settlement named Boydtown where he managed Boyd's whaling operations until 1848. Boyd even went so far as to have a house named "Merton Cottage" built for him. Brierly Point, on the coast of New South Wales commemorates his connection with that colony. His familiarity with the whaling industry led to a number of paintings of whaling subjects.

In 1848, Captain Owen Stanley, elder brother of Arthur Penrhyn Stanley, then in command of HMS Rattlesnake, invited Brierly to be his guest during an Admiralty survey of the north and east coast of Australia and the adjacent islands, in which Thomas Henry Huxley took part as biological observer. Brierly accompanied the survey during two cruises and took not only sketches, but notes of considerable value, which, however, remained unpublished. His name was given to an island in the Louisiade Archipelago.

In March 1850, the Hon. Henry Keppel asked Brierly to join him on HMS Maeander. He then visited New Zealand, the Friendly and Society Islands, and crossed the Pacific to Valparaíso. The cruise extended to the coasts of Chile, Peru, and Mexico, and the ship returned by the Straits of Magellan and Rio de Janeiro, and reached England at the end of July 1851.

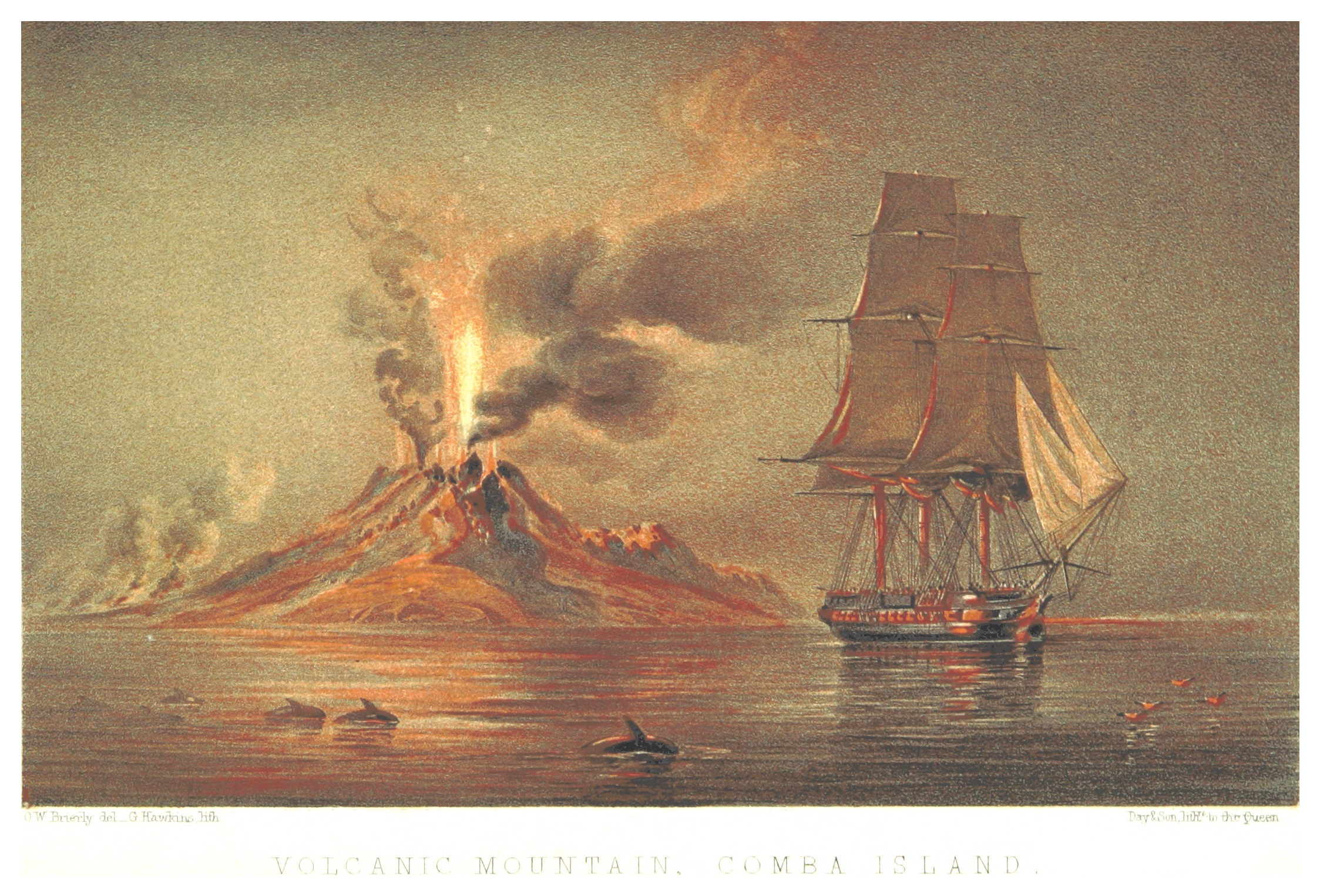
HMS Maeander, painted c. 1851.

Keppel's account of the voyage, published in 1853, was illustrated by eight lithographs by Brierly, who was made a fellow of the Royal Geographical Society on his return. After the declaration of war with the Russian Empire in February 1854, Brierly was again Keppel's guest, on HMS St Jean d'Acre, and the painter was present at all the operations of the allied fleets in the Baltic Sea, and sent home sketches for publication in the Illustrated London News. On the return of the fleet, Brierly had a series of fifteen large lithographs executed from his drawings, which were published on 2 April 1855, with the title The English and French Fleets in the Baltic, 1854. In the second year of the war, he accompanied Keppel to the Black Sea; witnessed all the chief events of the war in the Black Sea and Sea of Azov, and visited Circassia and Mingrelia with the Duke of Newcastle on HMS Highflyer. After his return, he was commanded by Queen Victoria to take sketches from the royal yacht of the great naval review which was held at Spithead at the end of the war.

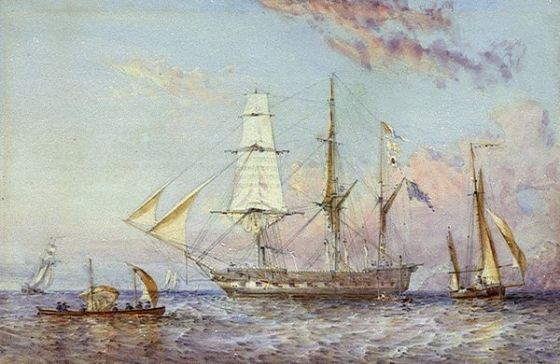
HMS Rattlesnake, painted 1853.

This was the commencement of a third period in the artist's career, during which he received the constant patronage of the royal family. In 1863, he accompanied Count Gleichen in HMS Racoon, on which the future Duke of Edinburgh was lieutenant, to Norway, and when the duke was appointed to the command of HMS Galatea, Brierly was attached to his suite and accompanied him on a cruise in the Mediterranean Sea and afterwards round the world, which lasted from 26 February 1867 to 26 June 1868. The sketches made by Brierly during the voyage were exhibited at South Kensington in 1868, and he contributed the illustrations to the record of the voyage by the Rev. John Milner, published in 1869. In 1868, Brierly was attached to the suite of the Prince of Wales during the tour to the Nile, Constantinople, and the Crimea. He contributed five drawings to the Royal Academy exhibitions of 1859–61; he exhibited again in 1870–71, but ceased to exhibit at the Academy on becoming an associate of the Royal Water-colour Society in 1872.

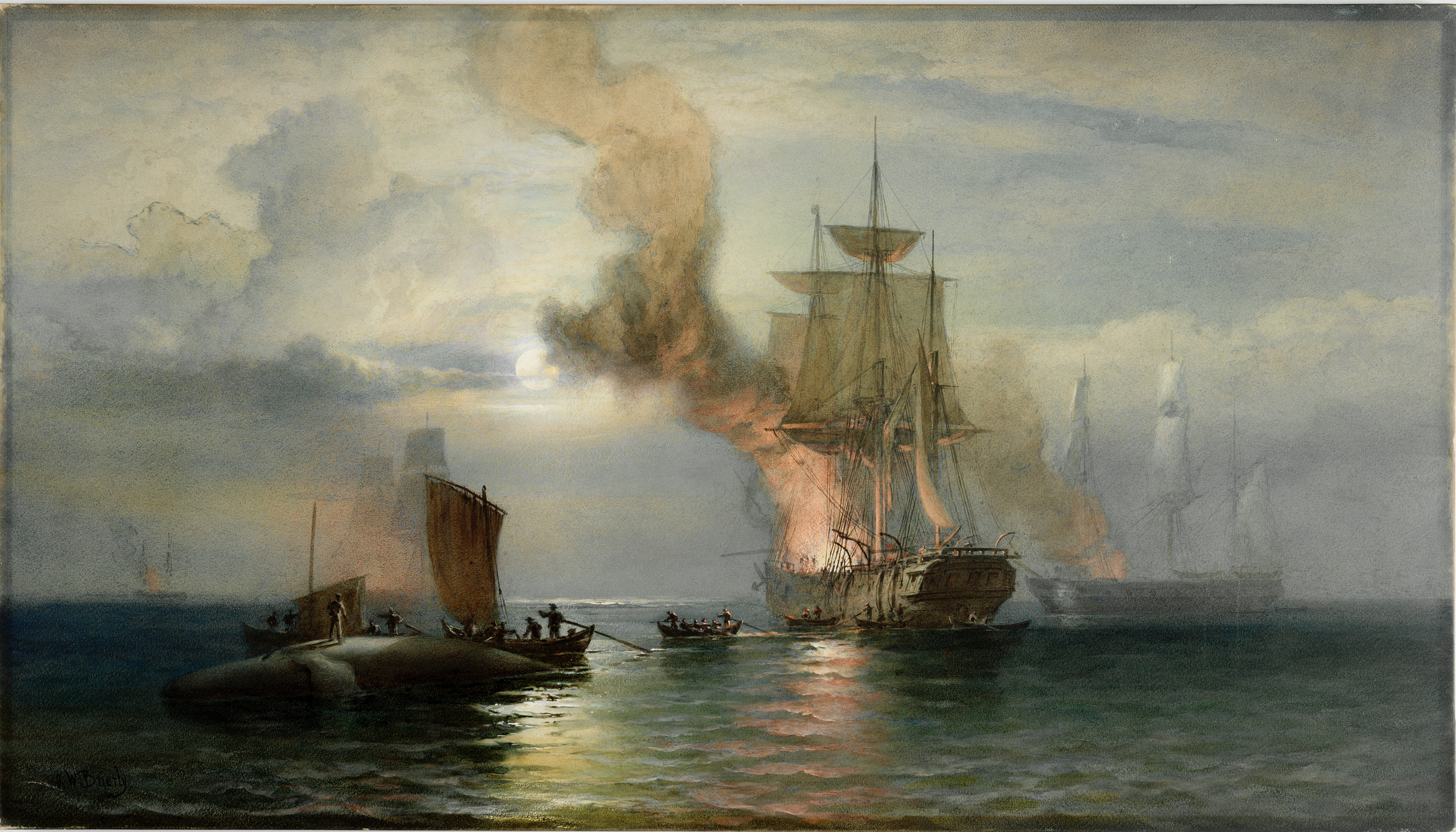
South Sea whalers boiling blubber, c1876. Dixon Galleries, State Library of New South Wales.

During the remainder of his life he contributed about two hundred water-colours to the society's exhibitions. These were, in part, founded on his early working life and travel experiences. His visits to Venice in 1874 and 1882 also supplied him materials for many of his most elaborate pictures; but the most characteristic subjects of his later period were historical. The first of these was 'The Retreat of the Spanish Armada' (Royal Academy, 1871). This was followed by 'Drake taking the Capitana to Torbay' (Royal Water-colour Society, 1872), and many other subjects from the history of the Spanish Armada and other stirring incidents of the Elizabethan age.

One of the most successful of these was 'The Loss of the Revenge' (1877), which was engraved for the Art Union of London. 'The Sailing of the Armada' (1879) and 'The Decisive Battle off Gravelines' (1881) were etched by Mr. David Law in 1882. Brierly was appointed marine painter to Queen Victoria, on the death of John Christian Schetky in 1874. He became marine painter to the Royal Yacht Squadron at the same time. In 1880, he was elected a full member of the Royal Water-colour Society. In 1881, he was appointed curator of the Painted Hall at Greenwich, and he received the honour of knighthood in 1885. He died in London on 14 December 1894.

== Family ==
In 1851, Brierly married, first, Sarah, daughter of Edmund Fry, a member of the Society of Friends. She died in 1870. In 1872 he married Louise Marie, eldest daughter of the painter, Louis Huard of London and Brussels. His second wife survived him.

== See also ==
- European and American voyages of scientific exploration

== Footnotes ==
This article incorporates text from a publication now in the public domain: Dodgson, Campbell (1901). "Brierly, Oswald Walters". In Lee, Sidney (ed.). Dictionary of National Biography (1st supplement). London: Smith, Elder & Co.
