= Ion Idriess =

Australian author (1889–1979)

Ion Idriess OBE
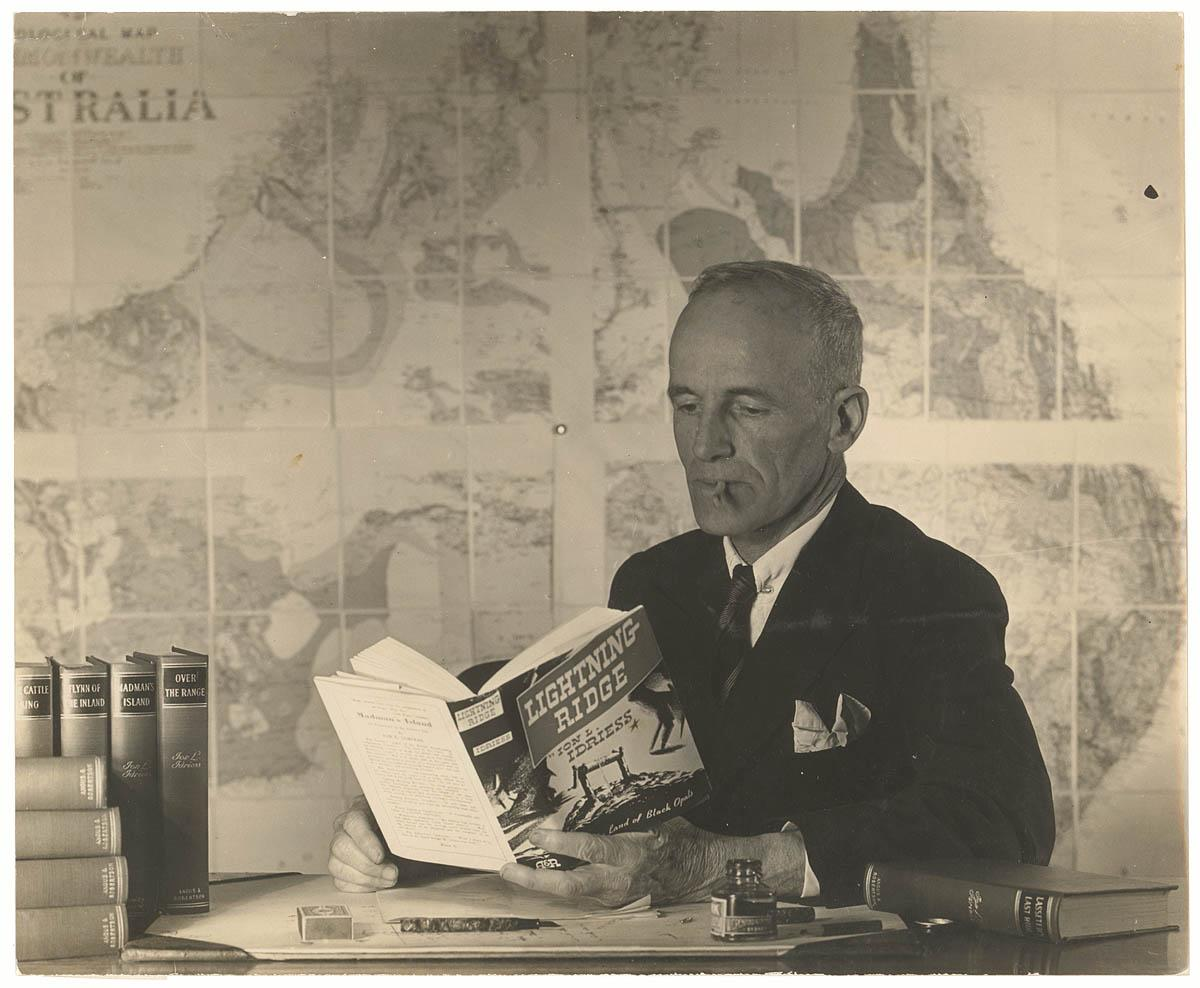
- Idriess reading his book Lightning Ridge, c. 1940–41
- Born: Ion Llewellyn Idriess; 20 September 1889; Waverley, New South Wales
- Died: 6 June 1979 (aged 89); Mona Vale, New South Wales, Australia
- Notable work: Madman's Island; Lasseter's Last Ride; Flynn of the Inland; Forty Fathoms Deep; Man Tracks; Gold Dust and Ashes

Ion Llewellyn Idriess OBE (20 September 1889 – 6 June 1979) was a prolific and influential Australian author. He wrote more than 50 books over 43 years between 1927 and 1969 – an average of one book every 10 months, and twice published three books in one year (1932 and 1940). His first book was Madman's Island, published in 1927 at the age of 38, and his last was written at the age of 79. Called Challenge of the North, it told of Idriess's ideas for developing the north of Australia.

Two of his works, The Cattle King (1936) and Flynn of the Inland (1932) had more than forty reprintings.

== Biography ==
=== Early years ===
Idriess was born in Waverley, a suburb of Sydney, to Juliette Windeyer (who had been born as Juliette Edmunds in 1865 at Binalong) and Walter Owen Idriess (a sheriff's officer born in 1862, who had emigrated from Dolgellau, in Wales). At birth Ion Idriess's name was registered as "Ion Windeyer", although he never seems to have used this name.

From his late teens, he worked in rural New South Wales, particularly in the Narrabri and Moree districts. He travelled extensively around the state, working in a variety of itinerant jobs including employment as a rabbit poisoner, boundary rider, drover, prospecting for gold as well as harvesting sandalwood. He also worked as a shearer and dingo shooter. While working as an opal miner at Lightning Ridge in about 1910, he wrote short pieces for The Bulletin about life on the opal fields.

He later headed north, working in several tin mines around Cairns and Cooktown including his own claim. In 1913 he moved to Cape York Peninsula, where he lived with an Aboriginal clan, learning their customs and lifestyle.

=== Military service ===
With the outbreak of war, in 1914 he returned to Townsville and enlisted in the 5th Light Horse Regiment, AIF, as a trooper. He saw action in Palestine, Sinai and Turkey, being wounded at Beersheba and Gallipoli – where he acted as spotter for noted sniper Billy Sing.

After returning to Australia and recuperating from his wounds, he travelled to remote Cape York, and worked with pearlers and missionaries in the Torres Strait islands and Papua New Guinea where he worked as a gold miner. Other ventures included buffalo shooting in the Northern Territory, and journeys to Central and Western Australia.

=== Career as a writer ===
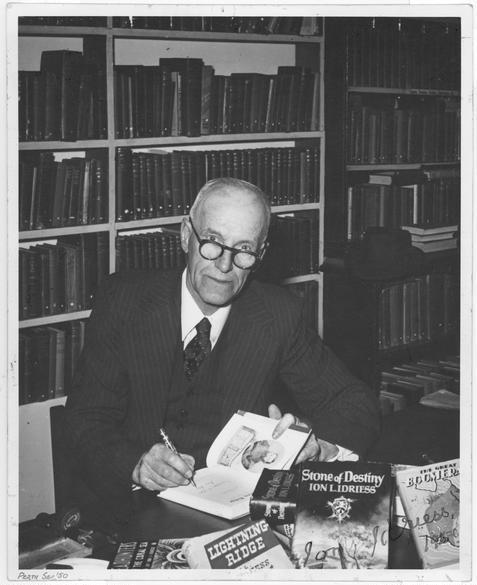
Ion Idriess in 1950

In 1928 Idriess settled in Sydney where he wrote as a freelance writer. His writing style drew on his experiences as a soldier, prospector, and bushman. He wrote on a multitude of topics, including travel, recollection, biography, history, anthropology and his own ideas on possible future events. His books were generally non-fiction, but written in a narrative, story style. Most of his books were published by Angus & Robertson. Idriess wrote from real life experiences using knowledge he had personally gained by travelling extensively and working at a variety of occupations. "Idriess was no stylist, but his writing was immediate, colourful, well paced and, despite the speed at which it was written, always well structured."

Although he generally wrote under his name, some early articles for The Bulletin were written under the pseudonym of "Gouger". When travelling, Idriess was known as "Jack".

In 1968 he was appointed an Officer of the Order of the British Empire for his services to literature.

== Death and legacy ==
Idriess died at a nursing home in Mona Vale in Sydney on 6 June 1979, at the age of 89.

His work slipped from favour after his death, but has experienced a renewal of interest. In 2017, Nicolas Rothwell said: "As so often in Australian letters, an initial fall into obscurity and the harsh judgments of the literary establishment serve as good indicators of a writer's pre-eminence".

His work was never adapted for the screen although several books were optioned by producers.

== Bibliography ==
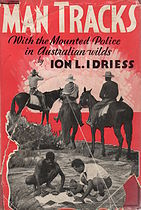
Man Tracks (1935)

=== 1927 to 1945 ===
- Madman's Island (1927). Fiction version and Idriess's first book. Published by Cornstalk Publications. All other Idriess titles were published by Angus and Robertson.
- Madman's Island (1938). Non-fiction version.
- Lasseter's Last Ride (1931). Lasseter's Reef gold discovery.
- Flynn of the Inland (1932). Tale of John Flynn, founder of the Royal Flying Doctor Service.
- The Desert Column (1932). Diary of an AIF trooper in Gallipoli, Sinai and Palestine.
- Men of the Jungle (1932). Gold and tin prospecting in Queensland.
- Gold Dust and Ashes (1933). Story of the New Guinea goldfields at Bulolo.
- Drums of Mer (1933). History and legends of the Torres Strait Islands.
- The Yellow Joss (1934). Collection of short stories.
- Man Tracks (1935). Tracking skills of Indigenous Australians of the Kimberley region.
- The Cattle King (1936). The story of Sir Sidney Kidman.
- Forty Fathoms Deep (1937). Pearl-diving community of Broome, Western Australia.
- Over the Range (1937). Story of the Kimberleys.
- Lightning Ridge (1940). Based on Idriess's opal prospecting experience at Lightning Ridge.
- Headhunters of the Coral Sea (1940). Story of the Torres Strait Islands.
- The Great Trek (1940). Tale of July 1864 expedition to walk from Rockhampton to Somerset Bay near the tip of Cape York Peninsula to establish a settlement, "Somerset".
- Nemarluk: King of the Wilds (1941). An indigenous Australian "outlaw" jailed at Fannie Bay Gaol in Darwin.
- The Great Boomerang (1941). A scheme for developing the Australian outback.
- The Silent Service Action (1944). Stories of submarine warfare. Written with T.M. Jones.
- Horrie the Wog-dog (1945). Horrie the Wog Dog's adventures with the AIF in Egypt, Greece, Crete and Palestine. Written with Jim Moody.

=== 1945 to 1969 ===
- In Crocodile Land (1946). Travels across Queensland and the Northern Territory, fishing, hunting and trading.
- Isles of Despair (1947). Story of a shipwrecked Scotswoman (Barbara Thomson) in the Torres Strait Islands.
- The Opium Smugglers (1947). Chinese opium smuggling on Cape York.
- Stone of Destiny (1948). Diamond mining and exploration in Australia. Later edition titled The Diamond – Stone of Destiny.
- One Wet Season (1949). Experiences in the Kimberley Region.
- The Wild White Man of Badu (1950). Story of a ruthless man's ambition to establish an empire among the islands of the Torres Strait. Complements the author's previous, related book Isles of Despair.
- Across the Nullarbor (1951). Story of Idriess's own drive across the Nullarbor from Sydney to Perth and return in a Peugeot 203.
- Outlaws of the Leopolds (1952). A story told from the aboriginal point of view, set in the then known King Leopold Ranges in Western Australia.
- The Red Chief (1953). A story of Cumbo Gunnerah, Indigenous Australian life and military strategy in New South Wales before European settlement.
- The Nor'-westers (1954). Story of pioneering in the Kimberley region.
- The Vanished People (1955). Social anthropology.
- The Silver City (1956). A history of Broken Hill.
- Coral Sea Calling (1957). Tales of northern Australia.
- Back o' Cairns (1958). Story of gold prospecting in the far north.
- The Tin Scratchers (1959). Story of tin mining in the far north.
- The Wild North (1960). Stories of the North of Australia.
- Tracks of Destiny (1961). History and future possibilities for the development of northern Australia.
- My Mate Dick (1962). Stories and anecdotes of prospecting in Queensland.
- Our Living Stone Age (1963). A work of popular anthropology.
- Our Stone Age Mystery (1964). Part-two to Our Living Stone Age.
- Challenge of the North (1969). More ideas for developing Australia's north.

=== Other works ===
Idriess wrote a number other books and pamphlets as well as having several collections of his works published.

The Mining and Prospecting series

A series of four titles which were basically "how-to" works, the first being commissioned by the Australian government as a means of opening up of the "outback" during the depression years.

- Prospecting for Gold (1931)
- Cyaniding for Gold (1939)
- Fortunes in Minerals (1941)
- Opals and Sapphires (1967)

Pamphlets

- Must Australia Fight? (1939). A political strategy – basically World War II propaganda.
- Onward Australia (1945). More propaganda, covering post-war development, and Australia taking its role in the region and the world.

Collections

- Gems from Ion Idriess (1949). A collection of extracts, published for schools.
- Ion Idriess's Greatest Stories (1986). A recent, two-volume set of six of the most popular titles.

Volume I: Flynn of the Inland, The Cattle King and Lasseter's Last Ride;
Volume II: The Desert Column, Lightning Ridge and The Silver City.

- The National Edition (1938, reissued 1941). A set of all of Idriess's works up to 1938 published as a uniform set of 12 hardback volumes.

The Australian Guerilla series

Written as a set of specialist military handbooks for the Australian Army for the World War II.

- Australian Guerilla – Shoot to Kill (1942). Practical details on accurate shooting.
- Australian Guerilla – Sniping (1942). Tactics for concealment and stalking, and how to identify an enemy's position by drawing fire.
- Australian Guerilla – Guerilla Tactics (1942). Bomb making, booby-traps and mines.
- Australian Guerilla – Trapping the Jap (1943). Particularly aimed at the expected Japanese military invasion of Australia.
- Australian Guerilla – Lurking Death (1943). Stories of snipers in Gallipoli, Sinai and Palestine
- Australian Guerilla – The Scout (1943)

== See also ==
- Australian outback literature of the 20th century
