= Angus & Robertson =

Australian bookseller, book publisher and book printer

- Type: Subsidiary
- Industry: Online bookselling
- Founded: January 1886; 140 years ago in Sydney, Australia
- Founders: David Angus; George Robertson
- Headquarters: Sydney, Australia
- Area served: Australia
- Parent: Booktopia Direct Pty Ltd
- Website: angusrobertson.com.au

Angus & Robertson (A&R) is a major Australian bookseller, publisher and printer. As book publishers, A&R has contributed substantially to the promotion and development of Australian literature. The brand currently exists as an online shop operated by Booktopia Direct Pty Ltd. The Angus & Robertson imprint is still used by HarperCollins, which has published books under the imprint since 1989.

== Bookselling history ==
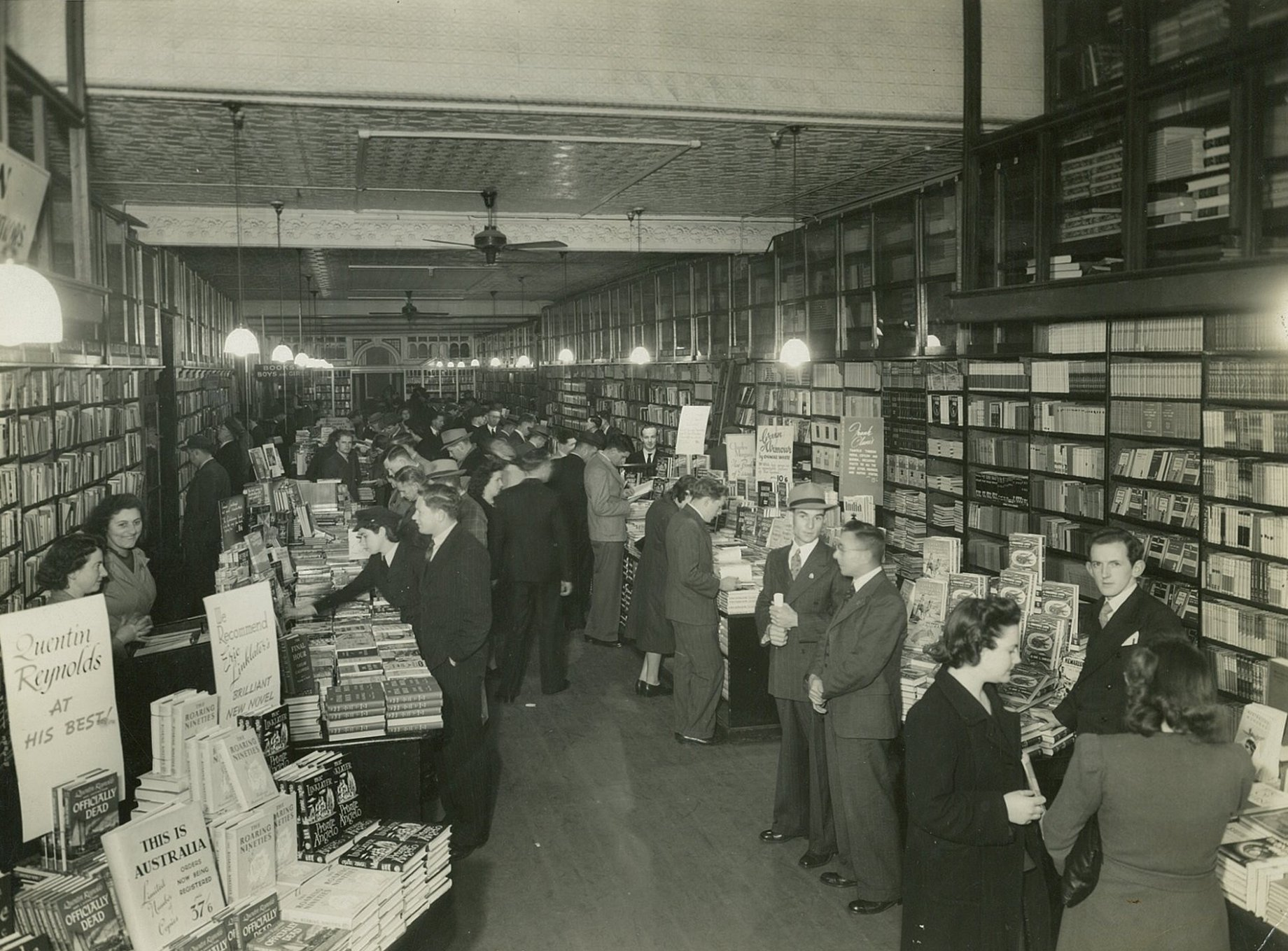
Interior of a store in 1946, Sydney

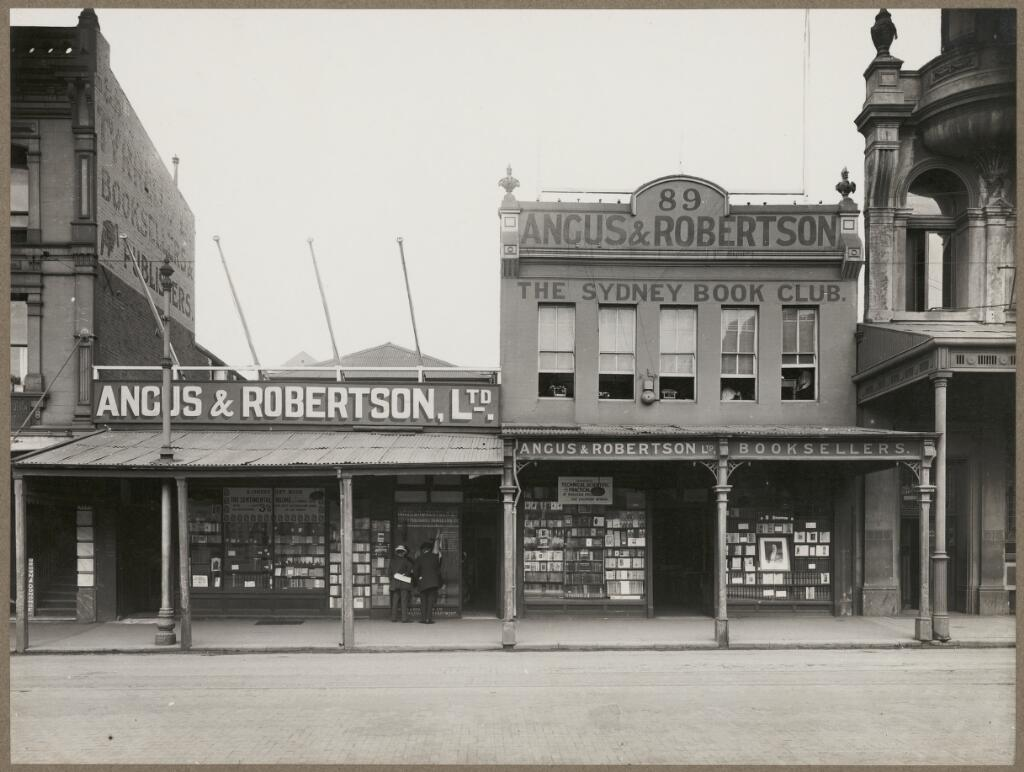
Angus & Robertson booksellers, 89 Castlereagh Street, Sydney, 1915. Note "The Sydney Book Club" sign.

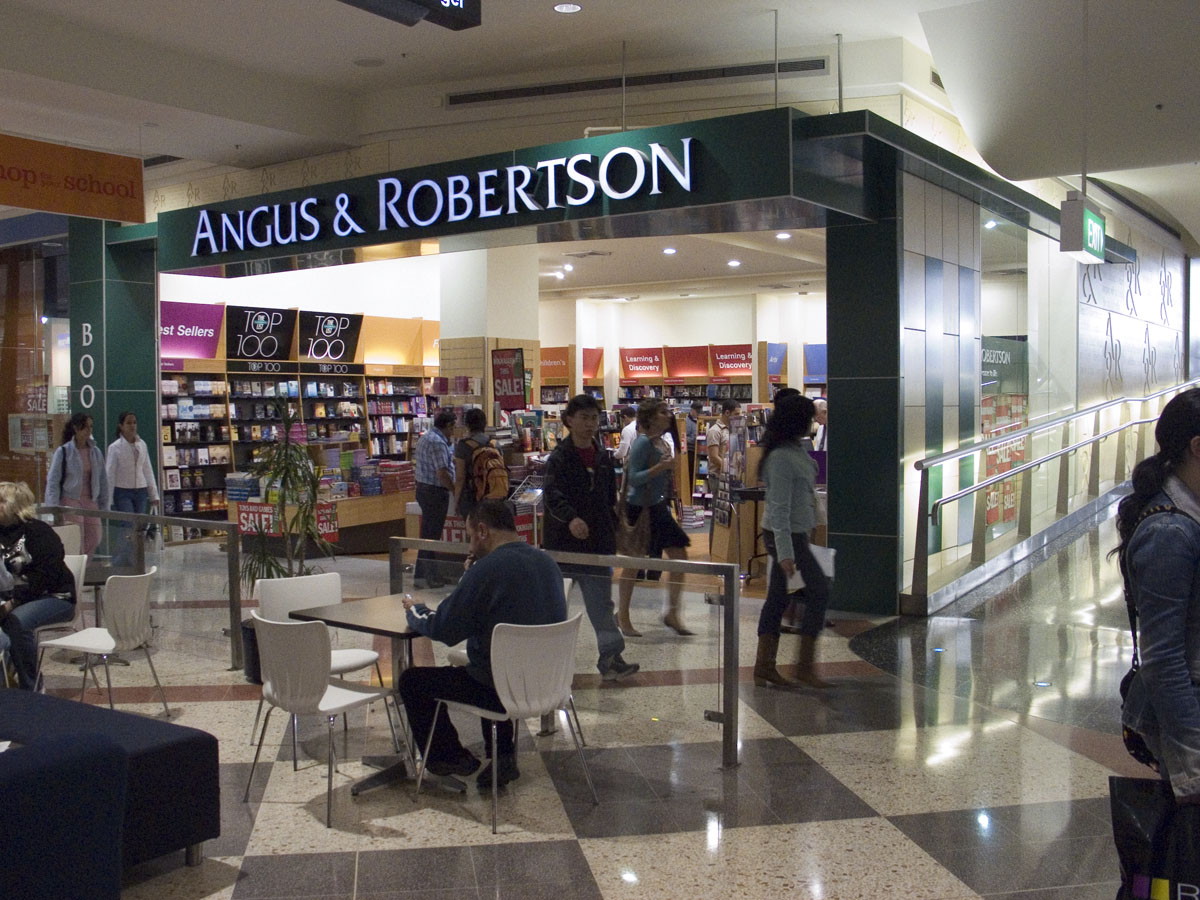
Angus & Robertson franchise store, Pitt Street Mall, Sydney, 2005

The first bookstore was opened in 110½ Market Street, Sydney by Scotsman David Mackenzie Angus (1855–1901) in 1884; it initially sold only secondhand books. In January 1886, Angus went into partnership with fellow Scot George Robertson (not to be confused with his older contemporary, George Robertson, the Melbourne bookseller and publisher, who later traded as Robertson & Mullens). In 1900, Angus, plagued by ill health, retired from the partnership to England, where he died soon after. Frederick Wymark took over a large portion of Angus's share in the company.

In 1895, the company moved to 89 Castlereagh Street, Sydney. The head office of the firm was at Castlereagh Street until the 1950s. The shop was known as the "biggest bookshop in the world". In 1907 the partnership was converted into a public company: Angus & Robertson Limited. In 1951 a store was established in High Commission of Australia, London, which operated until the 1970s.

In the 1950s, Angus & Robertson began the growth which led it to become Australia's first nationwide chain of bookstores. In the mid-1970s the main A&R bookstore was located at 207-209 Pitt Street and occupied several floors. In the 1980s and 1990s the main A&R bookstore had moved to "the entire basement level of the Imperial Arcade" at 168–174 Pitt Street (part of the Pitt Street Mall). In 1977, it opened its first franchise store in the southern Sydney suburb of Hurstville. In 2006, the company had over 170 stores spread throughout the country, and it claimed that it had more than twice as many stores as Australia's next largest bookseller. The firm had about 18% share in the Australian book retail market. In 2008 the largest Angus & Robertson bookstore was located at 168-174 Pitt Street Mall (in the ground floor level of the Imperial Arcade), Sydney.

George Robertson encouraged book collector David Scott Mitchell to convert to collecting in the then-neglected field of Australian literature. Mitchell accumulated a large collection (many bought from A&R), which ultimately formed the basis of the Mitchell Library of the State Library of New South Wales. George Robertson also encouraged businessman and collector William Dixson to collect Australian books and art. His collection ultimately formed the Dixson Library of the State Library of New South Wales.

In 2011, it closed all physical stores and became an online-only book retailer after 125 years of existence.

== Publishing history ==
Angus & Robertson began publishing in 1888. Their first work was a book of verse, A Crown of Wattle, written by a Sydney solicitor, H. Peden Steel. From the early years of publishing to 1900, Angus & Robertson developed a highly successful and profitable marketing formula and mix of products: a mixture of literary publishing together with educational publishing, plus active marketing by distributing large numbers of review copies. They also published valuable reference works, including the Australian Encyclopaedia, John Alexander Ferguson's multi-volume Bibliography of Australia, and the early years of Art in Australia. In 1938 A&R opened a publishing office in London.

As a publisher, Angus & Robertson has played a substantial role in shaping Australian literature by publishing, to huge sales, works by popular Australian authors such as Banjo Paterson, Henry Lawson, C. J. Dennis, Norman Lindsay, Frank Clune, Ion Idriess, Will H. Ogilvie, Colin Simpson, Arthur Upfield, Frank Dalby Davison, E. V. Timms, and children's writers Dorothy Wall and May Gibbs.

George Robertson died in 1933, and he was succeeded as publisher by Walter Cousins (to 1948) and George Ferguson (to 1971).

=== Book series ===
Book series (chronological order of publication)

- Australian School Series (1890s)
- The Snowy River Series (1898)
- Commonwealth Series (c. 1900)
- Commonwealth Manual Training Series (c. 1914)
- Australian Military Handbooks (1915–1945)
- Platypus Series (1923–)
- Mining and Prospecting series (1931–67)
- Australian Guerilla series (1942–43)
- Battle for Australia Series
- Junior Library of Australian Books (1949- )
- Blue Wren Books (1951– )
- Australian Poets (1963)
- Sirius Books (1963–65)
- Australian Classics (1968–91; 2013- )
- Young Australia Series (1970– )
- Arkon Paperbacks (1972–85)
- Australian Natural Science Library
- A&R Classics (1973– )
- A&R Poetry Classics (1975)
- Australian Literary Heritage Series (1975–86)
- A&R Non-Fiction Classics (1976–80)
- A&R Modern Poets (1976–93)
- A & R Playtexts,
- Famous Australian Lives
- Queensland Classic AKA Queensland Classics (1980– )
- Sirius Quality Paperbacks (1982–90)
- Outback Classic (1985)
- Bluegum series (1987- )
- Imprint Classics (1989– )
- The Finishing Touch (1993)
- Modern Australian Classics (2014)
- Pocket Editions for the Trenches

=== Imprints ===
Imprints have included Cornstalk Publishing (1924–1930; 1990s), Pacific Books (1961– ), Sirius Books (1979–1989) and Eden Paperbacks (1987– ).

==== Cornstalk Publishing ====
Cornstalk Publishing was established in 1924, "primarily for modest and usually abridged reprints, such as the Gumnut Reader series" by May Gibbs, and ceased in 1929. The publishing history of the imprint was important in the development of Australian children's books, in the era that it operated.

The imprint was notable for the publishing of writers of the era, including children's writer Mary Grant Bruce, and poets C.J. Dennis and Brunton Stephens. Subject areas of the publications included local histories, Christian apologetics, memoirs, bushcraft, and travel.

Although separate, the Angus and Robertson 'Platypus Series' coincided at times with the imprint.

Cornstalk published the first novel of Ion Idriess, Madman's Island.

The imprint was revived by Angus and Robertson in the 1980s and 1990s, publishing reprints including Annie Rentoul's The Lady of the Blue Beads and The Muddle-Headed Wombat on Clean-Up Day by Ruth Park.

== Printing history ==
To better control printing costs, and maintain a consistent quality, George Robertson bought a printing company Eagle Press in 1929, and renamed it Halstead Press (after his birthplace in Essex). Printing thus became the third tier of the Angus & Robertson business. It was Australia's leading book printer for forty years. However, the printing presses had become antiquated by the 1970s. After a corporate takeover, the printing presses were sold to John Sands. Halstead became a publishing imprint, Robertson's great-grandson having acquired the logo and identity. These he passed on to the present company, Halstead Press, when it was set up in 1991.

== The Sydney Book Club ==
About 1895 or 1896, George Robertson started The Sydney Book Club (SBC), based on the principles of a lending library. It evolved out of the actions of a group of legal men who bought 100 books for reading among themselves, then sold the books back to A&R. The SBC was a great success and highly profitable, as the same book could be borrowed by post and returned many times. Fifty to 100 copies of A&R bestsellers were often available for loan. The SBC had a vast membership throughout Australia, particularly in remote rural areas. It closed in 1958, as space was no longer available because of expansion of retail trade. Also, the rapid expansion of local government libraries throughout Australia offered a more localized and free service.

== Support for literary societies and authors ==
From time to time, Angus & Robertson has offered substantial support to literary societies. For example, it published the literary journal Southerly for some years. In 1947, the Book Collectors Society of Australia (BCSA) started publication of its monthly newsletter Biblionews. Until the 1970s, Angus & Robertson printed the newsletter free of charge, in return for the enclosure of a brochure about recent A&R publications. Eric Russell, an editor at Angus & Robertson (and local historian), was a consistent supporter of, and committee member of, the BCSA.

A&R has provided substantial incentives for promising Australian writers. For example, A&R frequently applied for federal grants to subsidise the publication of worthwhile but limited-market books.

In 1993, the first NBC Angus & Robertson Bookworld Prize of $10,000 was awarded for a first book of fiction by an unpublished writer. The award was sponsored by the National Book Council, and the winning book was published by Angus & Robertson Bookworld. The prize was also awarded in 1994 and 1995.

== Recent ownership ==
From 1959, a battle for control of Angus & Robertson commenced, based on its undervalued property holdings. Walter Burns, an outsider and real estate speculator, bought a large block of shares. He was appointed as managing director with the support of George Ferguson, but was soon in serious dispute with Ferguson.

Scottish publisher William Collins bought a significant defensive shareholding, acting on behalf of worried British publishers, as A&R comprised a significant proportion of their Australian sales. Ken Wilder of William Collins Australia joined the A&R board as an observer.

In 1970, entrepreneur Gordon Barton, via his IPEC transport company, bought the William Collins shares, and in 1971 made a takeover offer, and soon had control. Many of the old staff resigned, and a long period of rapid change followed, in which mass-market books became increasingly preferred, instead of high-brow and educational literature. Richard Walsh was managing director and publisher for 14 years (1972 to 1986), and he overhauled and modernised the antiquated and ossified business environment. From 1978, the publisher and bookseller were owned by separate companies.

=== Angus & Robertson Publishing ===
In 1981, Ipec Holdings sold Angus & Robinson Publishing, including its very valuable backlist, to News Limited. In 1987, News purchased Harper & Row (American publisher), and in 1989, William Collins. Thus in 1989, Angus & Robertson Publishing was part of the merger of William Collins and Harper & Row to form HarperCollins. Angus & Robertson Publishers has been an imprint of HarperCollins since 1989.

=== Angus & Robertson Booksellers ===
Ownership of the retail bookseller has changed several times since 1978. Ipec Holdings sold it to Gordon & Gotch, who invested substantial funds in upgrading and expanding the stores, including a major new store in Sydney's Imperial Arcade. When Gordon & Gotch was taken over by Herald & Weekly Times the business was sold to music retailer Brashs, who also bought Terry Herbert's Queensland-based Bookworld. For several years the company went by the name Angus & Robertson Bookworld before eventually dropping Bookworld as part of the name. Ownership of the company then passed on to Whitcoulls which was itself later purchased by WH Smith in 2001.

From 2009, Angus & Robertson was under the portfolio of REDgroup Retail, a retail operations company owned by Pacific Equity Partners, a private equity company, which loaded A&R with large debts. In February 2011, REDGroup (including the Borders, Angus & Robertson and Whitcoulls chains) were placed into voluntary administration. After failing to find a buyer, stores were closed or sold to operators like Collins Booksellers (who were cited as more knowledgeable as franchisee-owners rather than the inattentive private equity) as part of an agreement with creditors, and the A&R and Borders websites were sold to media conglomerate Pearson, which owns Penguin Books, and operations were moved from Sydney to Melbourne. In 2012 the Borders website was rebranded "Bookworld", but the Angus & Robertson website (still widely known) was retained as a clone of Bookworld.

In August 2015, Angus & Robertson joined with sister company Bookworld to form Angus & Robertson Bookworld under new owners Booktopia, and returned to its roots by moving its base of operation from Melbourne back to Sydney. In 2024, Angus & Robertson was purchased by Booktopia Direct Pty Ltd.

== Demand for payment from smaller publishers ==
In August 2007, A & R Whitcoulls Group's commercial manager, Charlie Rimmer, demanded payments ranging between $2,500 and $20,000 from smaller distributors and publishers to make up for reduced profitability compared to other suppliers. The letter, leaked by Tower Books to the public, claimed that if the payment was not made, the books from the supplier would no longer be sold in A&R stores. Many publishers expressed disbelief at A&R's decision. Tower declared that they will withdraw supply for A&R as per the letter's requirement.

In response to the situation, Dave Fenlon, Chief Operating Officer at Angus & Robertson, responded by claiming that the whole situation is blown up out of proportion and that A&R is simply negotiating a new business agreement with selected suppliers deemed to not be meeting their obligations to the company and that Angus & Robertson is committed to selling Australian published books from a large range of Australian publishers, large and small.

== See also ==
- List of oldest companies in Australia
