= Brandon-Cremer =

Brandon-Cremer could refer to either of two notable persons:

- Albert Wilhelm Anton Brandon-Cremer (1871–1959), often A. Brandon-Cremer, Irish-born theatre director and silent film maker; his daughter, Gertrude Brandon-Cremer, was well-known as a child actor.
- His son, Ernest Gustav Brandon-Cremer (1895–1957), often E. Brandon-Cremer, New Zealand-born adventurer and documentary film maker
