= Robert Buck =

Robert Buck may refer to:

- Robert N. Buck (1914–2007), American aviator
- Robert Otis Buck, model for Norman Rockwell's Willie Gillis World War II series
- Rob Buck (1958–2000), musician with 10,000 Maniacs
- Bob Buck (sportscaster) (1938–1996), American sportscaster
- Bob Buck (bushman), Australian pastoralist, bushman and drover
- Robbie Buck (born 1973), Australian radio announcer
- Robert Creighton Buck (1920–1998), mathematician
- Robert Sidney Buck (1884–1960), international footballer for Argentina and Uruguay
