= The Assembly (British TV series) =

2024 British TV series

- Genre: Interview
- Based on: Les Rencontres du Papotin by Éric Toledano and Olivier Nakache
- Directed by: Céin McGillicuddy
- Country of origin: United Kingdom
- Original language: English
- No. of seasons: 2
- No. of episodes: 13

Production
- Executive producers: Stu Richards; Michelle Singer
- Producer: Holly Ritchie
- Running time: 22–30 minutes
- Production company: Rockerdale Studios

Original release
- Network: BBC One
- Release: 5 April 2024
- Network: ITV1
- Release: 26 April 2025 – present

Related
- The Assembly (Australian TV series); The Assembly (Canadian TV series)

The Assembly is a British television interview programme series first broadcast on 5 April 2024. Based on the French show Les Rencontres du Papotin, British celebrities are interviewed by people with autism and other learning disabilities. The series has received generally positive reviews from critics.

== Format ==
People with autism, other forms of neurodivergence, and learning disabilities, interview well-known British personalities, with a musical or dance performance at the end of most episodes. Interviewers typically ask unconventional questions; for example, Stephen Fry's interview began with "You tried to kill yourself a couple of times, are you happy to be alive now?" and continued with "Are you a top or a bottom?" and "You've done adverts for Heineken, Alliance & Leicester, Twinings Tea, Pioneer Hi-Fi, Walkers Crisps, Marks & Spencer, Honda, Virgin Media, Extra Strong Mints, After Eight Mints, Sainsbury’s, Heathrow Airport, Direct Line, EE, and finally Whitbread, is there anything you wouldn’t do for money?". Politician Nicola Sturgeon described her appearance on The Assembly as "one of the most special experiences of [her] life".

The series' format is based on the French series Les Rencontres du Papotin (The Chatterbox Encounters), a format that had been adapted in 21 countries as of January 2026.

== Production ==
The series is produced by STV Studios label Rockerdale Studios, a "disability-led" production company.

A pilot episode featuring Michael Sheen aired on BBC One during Autism Acceptance Week, on 5 April 2024. The programme was later taken up by ITV after the BBC "could not afford to commission a full season". The first full series began on 26 April 2025, and the second on 8 April 2026. Each series concludes with one or two episodes of outtakes and unseen footage, titled The Assembly: Unseen.

== Episodes ==
Series	Episodes	Originally released		
Series	Episodes	First released	Last released	Network
Pilot		5 April 2024		BBC One
1	5	26 April 2025	18 May 2025	ITV1
2	8	8 April 2026	7 June 2026	ITV1

=== Pilot ===
No. overall	No. in series	Guest	Original release date
1	–	Michael Sheen	5 April 2024
Performance: "Here Comes the Sun"

=== Series 1 (2025) ===
No. overall	No. in series	Guest	Original release date
2	1	Danny Dyer	26 April 2025
Performance: "Movin' on Up"
3	2	David Tennant	27 April 2025
Performance: "Sunshine on Leith"
4	3	Jade Thirlwall	4 May 2025
Performance: "I'm Coming Out"
5	4	Gary Lineker	11 May 2025
Performance: "Nessun dorma"
6	5	The Assembly: Unseen	18 May 2025
Outtakes from Series 1.

=== Series 2 (2026) ===
No. overall	No. in series	Guest	Original release date
7	1	Stephen Fry	8 April 2026
Performance: "I Wish I Knew How It Would Feel to Be Free"
8	2	Nicola Sturgeon	10 April 2026
Performance: "Dignity"
9	3	Lenny Henry	17 April 2026
Performance: "Lean on Me"
10	4	Anna Maxwell Martin	21 April 2026
Performance: "Ain't Nobody"
11	5	Aitch	22 April 2026
Performance: "Live Forever"
12	6	Rylan Clark	24 May 2026
Performance: "Pure Shores"
13	7	The Assembly: Unseen	31 May 2026
Outtakes from Series 2. Performance: "Ain't Nobody" which was not broadcast in Episode 4
14	8	The Assembly: More Unseen	7 June 2026
More outtakes from Series 2.

== Reception ==
The Assembly has received generally positive reviews from critics. Writing in The Guardian, Chitra Ramaswamy awarded the pilot four stars, and dubbed it "lovely, novel and effective". Anita Singh of The Telegraph praised the first series as "a gem of a show". Jack Seale from The Guardian rated the second series five out of five stars. Emily Baker of The i Paper praised the show as "rare, powerful television".

However, the series has faced some criticism from the autistic community, with the series accused of being patronising.

== Awards ==
Year	Award	Category	Result	Ref.
2026	Royal Television Society Programme Awards	Formatted Popular Factual	Won	
2026	British Academy Television Awards	Best Factual Entertainment	Nominated	
