= Melissa Maclean =

Australian filmmaker

Melissa Maclean is an Australian filmmaker. She is known for her documentary work, including as director, showrunner, and executive producer, including on Parental Guidance (2021), The Assembly (2024–present), and Marc Fennell's The State of Man (2026).

== Early life and education ==
Melissa Maclean is a graduate of the Victorian College of the Arts.

== Career ==
Maclean co-directed, with Luke Walker, the 2008 documentary film, Beyond Our Ken looked at the Australian organisation Kenja, which described itself as "dedicated to realising human potential". The film, which premiered at HotDocs, garnered a nomination for the directors for the AFI Award for Best Direction in a Documentary and was also nominated for Best Documentary at the Film Critics Circle of Australia Awards.

Maclean was executive producer for Nine Network's Travel Guides, season 4 of which was filmed around Australia and the world during the COVID-19 pandemic in 2021. She also executive produced the factual entertainment series, Parental Guidance for Nine in 2021.

Maclean was showrunner, director, and co-executive producer of the 2024 Australian TV series The Assembly, presented by Leigh Sales, which won the 2026 Logie Award for Best Factual or Documentary Program.

In 2026, Maclean directed and co-executive produced a three-part documentary series for ABC Television titled The State of Man, which was created, produced, and presented by journalist Marc Fennell. Commissioned by the ABC, it aired on ABC TV and ABC iview from 13 October 2026. Its focus is how boys and young men absorb the concept of masculinity, in particular via the Internet and the "manosphere".
