= Stephen Mutch =

Australian politician

Dr Stephen Mutch

Member of the Australian Parliament for Cook
- In office 2 March 1996 – 31 August 1998
- Preceded by: Don Dobie
- Succeeded by: Bruce Baird

Member of the New South Wales Legislative Council
- In office 19 March 1988 – 31 January 1996

Personal details
- Born: 4 February 1956 (age 70) Sydney, New South Wales, Australia
- Party: Liberal
- Spouse: Jennifer Brown (m. 1994)
- Relations: Thomas Mutch (great-uncle)
- Children: Two
- Education: University of New South Wales
- Occupation: Solicitor

Stephen Bruce Mutch (born 4 February 1956) is an Australian academic, and former politician with an academic interest in cultic organisations. A member of the Liberal Party, he served in the New South Wales Legislative Council from 1988 to 1996 and represented the seat of Cook in the House of Representatives from 1996 to 1998.

== Early life ==
Mutch was born in Sydney on 4 February 1956, the son of Bruce and Shirley Mutch. His father's uncle Thomas Mutch was a state MP in New South Wales who began his career in the Australian Labor Party (ALP) but later joined the United Australia Party (UAP). On his mother's side his descendants include a First Fleet convict and a Swiss-Italian immigrant.

Mutch holds the degrees of Bachelor of Arts, Master of Arts, and Master of Laws from the University of New South Wales. He worked as a solicitor from 1979 to 1983 and was also a partner in a tourist park in Heathcote, New South Wales. He served as president of the Sutherland Shire's youth council.

== Politics ==
Mutch worked as a policy adviser from 1984 to 1987. He won Liberal preselection for the New South Wales Legislative Council in 1986, at which point he was the executive assistant to Ted Pickering. A member of the party's Port Hacking branch, he won election to an eight-year term at the 1988 state election and was re-elected to a further eight-year term at the 1995 state election. Mutch served as a parliamentary representative on the council of the University of Wollongong from 1990 to 1995. He resigned on 31 January 1996.

In May 1995, Mutch won preselection for the federal Division of Cook. He retained the seat for the Liberals at the 1996 federal election following the retirement of Don Dobie. However, prior to the 1998 election he lost Liberal preselection to Bruce Baird "amidst accusations of local branch stacking and despite strong personal support from the Prime Minister [John Howard]". There had initially been three other candidates for preselection against Mutch, including Mark Speakman, a rare instance of a first-term MP being challenged. Howard reportedly spent "hours locked away in a room during a state Liberal Council meeting appealing to people with influence in the local area to call off the challenges", but was told that Mutch did not have the support of local branches. Baird was suggested as a compromise candidate by Bill Heffernan, against Howard's wishes, and was successful after the other candidates withdrew to avoid splitting the vote.

Mutch unsuccessfully contested Liberal preselection for the state seat of Cronulla in 2010, losing to his old Cook challenger Mark Speakman by 82 votes to 74 after a tied first ballot, with Speakman finally beating Mutch in a preselection contest.

== Controversies ==
In March 1993, Mutch moved a motion in the Legislative Council calling for a select inquiry into cults, which the Church of Scientology subsequently described as akin to Nazi Germany. In the same year he publicly alleged that Kenja Communication was an "insidious manipulative cult" and that one of its co-founders Ken Dyers had physical, mentally and sexually abused its members. As a result members of Kenja subsequently began a targeted campaign of harassment against Mutch, including disrupting his wedding and stalking him. In March 1994 a senior female Kenja member falsely alleged that Mutch had sexually assaulted her in 1978. The accusations were widely reported, and after leaving the organisation the woman recanted. The allegations were also repeated in an anonymous letter campaign sent to Mutch's constituents and members of the press.

== Later career ==
After leaving parliament, Mutch took up a position as an honorary fellow at Macquarie University, teaching courses on Australian politics. He served on the editorial board of the International Journal of Cultic Studies, a publication of the International Cultic Studies Association, He was awarded a doctorate by University of New South Wales in 2004 with a Ph.D. thesis titled "Cults, religion and public policy: A comparison of official responses to scientology in Australia and the United Kingdom".

== Personal life ==
Mutch married Jennifer Brown in 1994, with whom he had two children.

Parliament of Australia
Preceded by Don Dobie	Member for Cook; 1996–1998	Succeeded by Bruce Baird
