= Beyond Our Ken (disambiguation) =

Beyond Our Ken is a British radio comedy programme.

Beyond our Ken may also refer to:

- Beyond Our Ken (2004 film), Hong Kong film
- Beyond Our Ken (2008 film), Australian film
