= The Assembly (Australian TV series) =

2024–present Australian TV series

- Genre: Documentary television
- Based on: Les Rencontres du Papotin by Éric Toledano and Olivier Nakache
- Directed by: Melissa Maclean
- Presented by: Leigh Sales
- Country of origin: Australia
- Original language: English
- No. of seasons: 3
- No. of episodes: 19

Production
- Executive producers: Melissa Maclean; Mark Fennessy; Therese Hegarty; Vanessa Oxlad; Julie Hanna
- Producer: Mark Fennessy
- Running time: 60 minutes
- Production company: Helium Pictures

Original release
- Network: ABC TV
- Release: 20 August 2024 – present

Related
- The Assembly (British TV series); The Assembly (Canadian TV series)

The Assembly is an Australian television documentary series on ABC TV, which premiered on 20 August 2024.

== Format ==
Hosted and mentored by Leigh Sales, the documentary series focuses on a group of 15 autistic journalism students and lecturers at Macquarie University as they prepare for and eventually interview some of Australia's best-known personalities. The students have been given paid internship at the ABC. The series' format is based on the French series Les Rencontres du Papotin (Chatterbox Encounters), created by filmmakers Éric Toledano and Olivier Nakache based on their magazine Le Papotin. The concept has been adapted in 21 countries, including Spain (100% únicos), Canada (The Assembly) and Great Britain (The Assembly).

== Production ==
The seven-part series is produced by Mark Fennessy's Helium Pictures for the ABC, with production beginning in May. Fennessy also executive produces the Australian version alongside director Melissa Maclean, Therese Hegarty, Vanessa Oxlad and Julie Hanna.

== Season overview ==
Season	Episodes	Originally aired	
Season	Episodes	Season premiere	Season finale
1	7	20 August 2024	30 September 2024
2	6	21 September 2025	26 October 2025
3	6	26 April 2026	31 May 2026

== Episodes ==
=== Season 1 (2024) ===
No. overall	No. in season	Interviewee Title	Original release date	Aus. viewers (national)
1	1	Sam Neill	20 August 2024	577,000
2	2	Hamish Blake	27 August 2024	486,000
3	3	Anthony Albanese	3 September 2024	435,000
4	4	Delta Goodrem	10 September 2024	415,000
5	5	Adam Goodes	17 September 2024	415,000
6	6	Amanda Keller	24 September 2024	381,000
7	7	Becoming the Assembly	30 September 2024	298,000

=== Season 2 (2025) ===
No. overall	No. in season	Interviewee Title	Original release date	Aus. viewers (national)
8	1	Richard Roxburgh	21 September 2025	543,000
9	2	Guy Sebastian	28 September 2025	457,000
10	3	Ray Martin	5 October 2025	400,000
11	4	Julia Morris	12 October 2025	418,000
12	5	Steve Waugh	19 October 2025	500,000
13	6	Maggie Beer	26 October 2025	471,000

=== Season 3 (2026) ===
No. overall	No. in season	Interviewee Title	Original release date	Aus. viewers (national)
14	1	Andy Lee	26 April 2026	508,000
15	2	Claudia Karvan	3 May 2026	478,000
16	3	Jimmy Barnes	10 May 2026	528,000
17	4	Dave Hughes	17 May 2026	410,000
18	5	Jessica Mauboy	24 May 2026	460,000
19	6	Ian Thorpe	31 May 2026	454,000

== Reception ==
The first episode of The Assembly received an overnight average audience of 577,000 viewers, alongside a national audience reach of 859,000 viewers.

David Knox of TV Tonight gave the series four out of five stars. Debi Enker of The Sydney Morning Herald wrote about the series' tone, "The tone of The Assembly, like other ABC factual productions, is warm. ... So in addition to being a worthwhile and engaging undertaking, it represents a breath of fresh air in terms of TV interviews, particularly those featuring politicians, but not confined to them. The show has also been criticised as being inspiration porn, with further criticism over the fact that the journalism students, initially, were not to be paid.

== Awards ==
Year	Award	Category	Nominee(s)	Result	Ref.
2025	TV Week Logies	Best Factual or Documentary Program	The Assembly	Nominated	
2026	TV Week Logies	Best Factual or Documentary Program	The Assembly	Won	
