= Stateless (TV series) =

- Genre: Drama
- Created by: Cate Blanchett; Tony Ayres; Elise McCredie
- Written by: Elise McCredie; Belinda Chayko
- Directed by: Emma Freeman; Jocelyn Moorhouse
- Composer: Cornel Wilczek
- Country of origin: Australia
- Original language: English
- No. of seasons: 1
- No. of episodes: 6

Production
- Executive producers: Cate Blanchett; Andrew Upton; Tony Ayres; Elise McCredie; Liz Watts; Sally Riley; Andrew Gregory
- Producers: Sheila Jayadev; Paul Ranford
- Editors: Mark Atkin; Martin Connor
- Running time: 60 minutes
- Production companies: Matchbox Pictures; Dirty Films

Original release
- Network: ABC TV (Australia); Netflix (international)
- Release: 1 March 2020

Stateless is an Australian television drama series launched on ABC TV on 1 March 2020. The six episodes were released on Netflix on 8 July 2020 and later removed in 2025.

The series is partly inspired by the real-life story of Cornelia Rau, an Australian who was unlawfully detained under the Australian Government's mandatory detention program.

The show has been criticized for misrepresenting the human rights issue of statelessness and disregarding the experiences of actual stateless people.

== Synopsis ==
The series centres on four strangers in an immigration detention centre in the Australian desert: an airline hostess escaping a suburban cult, an Afghan refugee fleeing persecution, a young Australian father escaping a dead-end job and a bureaucrat caught up in a national scandal. When their lives intersect they are pushed to the brink of sanity, yet unlikely and profound emotional connections are made amongst the group.

After the sixth and final episode, the epilogue states the program was based upon true stories about Australian immigration detention.

== Cast ==
- Yvonne Strahovski as Sofie Werner, a German-Australian flight attendant who struggles with mental health issues, based on Cornelia Rau
- Marta Dusseldorp as Margot Werner, Sofie’s responsible older sister
- Asher Keddie as Clare Kowitz, a representative of the Department of Immigration Management and Multicultural Affairs (DIMMA, based on DIMIA)
- Sarah Peirse as Assistant Secretary Genevieve Mundy, Clare’s superior at DIMMA in Canberra
- Dan Spielman as David Meakin, a journalist reporting on the Australian immigration policy and its effects
- Fayssal Bazzi as Ahmad Ameer, a refugee from Afghanistan
- Soraya Heidari as Mina, Ameer’s eldest daughter
- Jai Courtney as Off. Cameron ‘Cam’ Sandford, a new officer at Barton Immigration Detention Centre
- Maria Angelico as Angie Sandford, Cam’s wife
- Kate Box as Janice Sandford, Cam’s older sister who is critical of the Australian immigration policy
- Darren Gilshenan as Brian Ashworth, the general manager of Barton Immigration Detention Centre
- Rachel House as Off. Harriet Tawake, the cruel coordinator of the officers at Barton Immigration Detention Centre
- Clarence Ryan as Off. Sullivan, a close friend of Cam’s and a fellow officer at Barton Immigration Detention Centre
- Rose Riley as Off. Sharee Burton, a young officer at Barton Immigration Detention Centre
- Dominic West as Gordon Masters, co-founder of GOPA, based on Ken Dyers of Kenja Communication
- Cate Blanchett as Pat Masters, co-founder of GOPA, based on Jan Hamilton of Kenja Communication
- Claude Jabbour as Farid, an Arab refugee who befriends Ameer before ending up at Barton
- Kwame N. Kamara as Mosi, an African refugee who befriends Ameer before ending up at Barton
- Phoenix Raei as Javad Shahrokh, one of the refugees at Barton, who is separated from his family
- Helana Sawires as Rosna, a Kurdish refugee at Barton
- Syd Brisbane as Teddy

== Episodes ==
No.	Title	Directed by	Written by	Original release date	Australia viewers
1	"The Circumstances in Which They Come"	Emma Freeman	Elise McCredie	1 March 2020	441,000
2	"Incognita"	Emma Freeman	Elise McCredie	8 March 2020	363,000
3	"The Right Thing"	Emma Freeman	Belinda Chayko	15 March 2020	390,000
4	"Run Sofie Run"	Jocelyn Moorhouse	Elise McCredie	22 March 2020	430,000
5	"Panis Angelicus"	Jocelyn Moorhouse	Belinda Chayko	29 March 2020	409,000
6	"The Seventh Circle"	Jocelyn Moorhouse	Elise McCredie	5 April 2020	469,000

== Production ==
The series is partly inspired by the real-life story of Cornelia Rau, an Australian who was unlawfully detained under the Australian Government's mandatory detention program.

Blanchett says that the title "refers to statelessness in a more poetic sense, not in a legal, physical sense. It's more about identity and the loss of people's identity when they are faced with long-term detention, when they become a number, when they are dislocated from markers in their life like home and culture, and separated from their families".

The music for the series was composed by Cornel Wilczek.

== Release ==
Stateless had its world premiere at the 70th Berlin International Film Festival in February 2020, in the new Series section, along with Mystery Road Series 2.

The Australian television channel ABC premiered the series in Australia soon afterwards, on 1 March 2020. Netflix released the series globally on 8 July 2020.

== Awards and nominations ==
The script for Episode 6 by Elise McCredie was shortlisted for the Betty Roland Prize for Scriptwriting at the 2021 New South Wales Premier's Literary Awards.

Year	Award	Category	Recipient	Result	Ref(s)
2020	AACTA Awards	Best Miniseries or Telefeature	Cate Blanchett, Elise McCredie, Tony Ayres, Sheila Jayadev, Paul Ranford, Liz Watts, Andrew Upton	Won	
2020	AACTA Awards	Best Screenplay in Television	Elise McCredie (for "The Circumstances in Which They Come")	Won	
2020	AACTA Awards	Best Lead Actor in a Television Drama	Fayssal Bazzi	Won	
2020	AACTA Awards	Best Lead Actor in a Television Drama	Jai Courtney	Nominated	
2020	AACTA Awards	Best Lead Actress in a Television Drama	Yvonne Strahovski	Won	
2020	AACTA Awards	Best Lead Actress in a Television Drama	Asher Keddie	Nominated	
2020	AACTA Awards	Best Guest or Supporting Actor in a Television Drama	Darren Gilshenan	Won	
2020	AACTA Awards	Best Guest or Supporting Actress in a Television Drama	Cate Blanchett	Won	
2020	AACTA Awards	Best Direction in Television	Emma Freeman	Won	
2020	AACTA Awards	Best Direction in Television	Jocelyn Moorhouse	Nominated	
2020	AACTA Awards	Best Cinematography in Television	Bonnie Elliott (for "The Circumstances in Which They Come")	Won	
2020	AACTA Awards	Best Editing in Television	Mark Atkin (for "The Circumstances in Which They Come")	Won	
2020	AACTA Awards	Best Editing in Television	Martin Connor (for "The Seventh")	Nominated	
2020	AACTA Awards	Best Sound in Television	Tom Heuzenroeder, Pete Smith, Michael Darren, Des Kenneally (for "The Circumstances in Which They Come")	Won	
2020	AACTA Awards	Best Original Music Score in Television	Cornel Wilczek (for "The Seventh")	Won	
2020	AACTA Awards	Best Production Design in Television	Melinda Doring (for "The Circumstances in Which They Come")	Won	
2020	AACTA Awards	Best Costume Design in Television	Mariot Kerr (for "The Circumstances in Which They Come")	Won	
