= Beyond Our Ken (2008 film) =

- Directed by: Luke Walker; Melissa Maclean
- Distributed by: Hopscotch Entertainment
- Release date: 18 September 2008
- Running time: 88 minutes
- Country: Australia
- Language: English

Beyond Our Ken is a 2008 Australian documentary film directed by Luke Walker and Melissa Maclean about the controversial organisation Kenja.

== Production ==
The two filmmakers, Luke Walker and Melissa Maclean, were among the group of graduates of the Victorian College of the Arts who made the film.

== Release and reception ==
The film premiered at HotDocs. It was released in Australian cinemas on 18 September 2008.

== Reception and accolades ==
In a review for The Age, Jim Schembri wrote "Extraordinary, powerful, unflinching... The climactic sequence where Dyers cracks over the issue of sexual misconduct is positively electrifying... Strongly recommended".

The film garnered a nomination for the directors for the AFI Award for Best Direction in a Documentary and was also nominated for Best Documentary at the Film Critics Circle of Australia Awards.

== Home media ==
Beyond Our Ken was released on DVD by Hopscotch Entertainment.
