= Les Rencontres du Papotin =

2022 French TV program

- Genre: Magazine
- Created by: Eric Toledano and Olivier Nakache
- Opening theme: On peut tout dire au Papotin!
- Country of origin: France
- Original language: French
- No. of seasons: 4
- No. of episodes: 33

Production
- Running time: 30 minutes

Original release
- Network: France 2
- Release: 3 September 2022 – present

Les Rencontres du Papotin (English: The Chatterbox Encounters) is a French television programme where a celebrity answers questions from non-professional journalists with autism spectrum disorder. The discussion is moderated by Julien Bancilhon, psychologist and editor-in-chief of Le Papotin, a magazine edited mostly by autistic people.

It has been broadcast in France since 3 September 2022. It airs on certain Saturdays at 8:30p.m. on France 2, after the 8 p.m. news. It has been rebroadcast in Belgium since 5 October 2023, where it is shown on Sunday at 2 p.m. on La Une, in contrast to the original broadcast order.

The show adapts the newspaper Le Papotin based on an idea by directors Éric Toledano and Olivier Nakache, by inviting a media personality to face the journalists from the newspaper's editorial staff.

== Production ==
Between the initial ideas and the first broadcast, three years of reflection and unsuccessful attempts passed to find a formula in keeping with the spirit of the newspaper and its editorial staff.

Julien Bancilhon, its editor-in-chief, commented:

At first, we had trouble meeting; it was cordial, but it didn’t work. Le Papotin is a joyful mess, difficult to structure. Putting together a show by snapping your fingers, making something rigid with a set, precise and repeated questions, a specific speaking time for everyone—that doesn't work here.

The filming takes three hours while the final broadcast lasts only about thirty minutes.

== Episodes ==
=== Season 1 (2022-2023) ===
Guests from season 1
No	Release date	Guest	Viewership	Market share over 4 years and older	Ref.
1	3 September 2022	Gilles Lellouche	3,300,000	20%	
2	8 October 2022	Camille Cottin	2,720,000	14.6%	
3	19 November 2022	Julien Doré	3,100,000	16%	
4	7 January 2023	Emmanuel Macron	4,540,000	22.5%	
5	4 March 2023	Virginie Efira	3,240,000	17.2%	
6	22 April 2023	Josiane Balasko	3,310,000	18.4%	
7	20 May 2023	Angèle	2,690,000	16%	
8	24 June 2023	Thomas Pesquet	2,420,000	17.2%	

The highest audience figures

=== Season 2 (2023-2024) ===
The guests of season 2
No	Release date	Guest	Viewership	Market share over 4 years and older	Ref.
1	2 September 2023	Jonathan Cohen	2,510,000	15.4%	
2	7 October 2023	Juliette Armanet	2,750,000	15.4%	
3	4 November 2023	Dany Boon	3,950,000	20.3%	
4	2 December 2023	Christiane Taubira	2,810,000	15.2%	
5	6 January 2024	Adèle Exarchopoulos	3,230,000	16.3%	
6	10 February 2024	François Cluzet	3,230,000	17.8%	
7	9 March 2024	Ginette Kolinka	2,770,000	15.2%	
8	6 April 2024	Philippe Etchebest	2,960,000	17.4%	
9	4 May 2024	Benoît Magimel	3,070,000	17.5%	

The highest audience figures

=== Season 3 (2024-2025) ===
The guests of season 3
No	Release date	Guest(s)	Viewership	Market share over 4 years and older	Ref.
1	7 September 2024	Philippe Katerine	2,250,000	13.6%	
2	5 October 2024	Antoine Dupont	3,270,000	18.6%	
3	9 November 2024	Clara Luciani	3,120,000	17.4%	
4	11 January 2025	Matthieu Ricard	3,320,000	18.7%	
5	8 February 2025	Marion Cotillard	3,310,000	18.7%	
6	8 March 2025	Omar Sy	3,590,000	21%	
7	5 April 2025	Charlotte Gainsbourg	3,020,000	19.9%	
8	23 May 2025	Diane Kruger, Élodie Bouchez, Raphaël Quenard	2,440,000	14.7%	
9	7 June 2025	Benjamin Lavernhe	2,270,000	14.9%	
10	12 July 2025	Claude Lelouch	2,540,000	19.4%	

The highest audience figures

=== Season 4 (2025-2026) ===
Guests from season 4
No	Release date	Guest(s)	Viewership	Market share over 4 years and older	Ref.
1	20 September 2025	Valérie Lemercier	2,700,000	17.2%	
2	25 October 2025	Jean-Louis Aubert	3,180,000	18.5%	
3	22 November 2025	Pierre Niney	3,340,000	18.9%	
4	31 January 2026	Orelsan	2,690,000	16.5%	
5	21 February 2026	Muriel Robin	2,840,000	16.3%	
6	21 March 2026 (Note: Live from L'Alpe d'Huez Film Festival)	Franck Dubosc	2,930,000	18.6%	

The highest audience figures

== International versions ==
The show is sold internationally under the title The A Talk and has been adapted in 21 countries.

- Denmark (En Særlig Samtale)
- Spain (100% únicos)
- Poland (Autentyczni) in 2023
- United Kingdom (The Assembly)
- Norway (A-Laget)
- Sweden (Frågan är fri)
- Australia (The Assembly) in 2024
- Netherlands (Een buitengewoon gesprek)
- Singapore (The Assembly) in 2025
- Israel (Special Interview, Hebrew: ריאיון מיוחד, romanized: Reayon meyuhad)
- English-speaking Canada (CBC Television, The Assembly) in 2025
- French-speaking Canada (ICI Télé, Facteur A) in 2026
