= Luke Walker (filmmaker) =

British/Australian film maker

Luke Walker is a British/Australian film maker. His 2008 documentary film, Beyond Our Ken explored the group Kenja Communication, a controversial Australian "self-empowerment" organisation. It garnered Walker an AACTA Award for Best Direction in a Documentary nomination (shared with co-director Melissa Maclean). Beyond Our Ken was also nominated for Best Documentary at the Film Critics Circle of Australia Awards and also by the Australian Film Institute.

Walker's 2013 documentary feature Lasseter's Bones explores a fabled seam of gold said to be lost in Central Australia, the notorious Lasseter's Reef. The film follows Harold Bell Lasseter's elderly son on his last desert expedition to find his father's lost gold.

Lasseter's Bones was nominated for Best Documentary at the Film Critics Circle of Australia Awards.

Walker's 2017 documentary PACmen follows the Super-PACs backing Ben Carson's ill-fated presidential campaign. PACmen premièred at Hot Docs Canadian International Film Festival in May 2017.

Walker was born in Birmingham, West Midlands, England, and is a graduate of the Victorian College of the Arts.
