= Kenja Communication =

Australian company

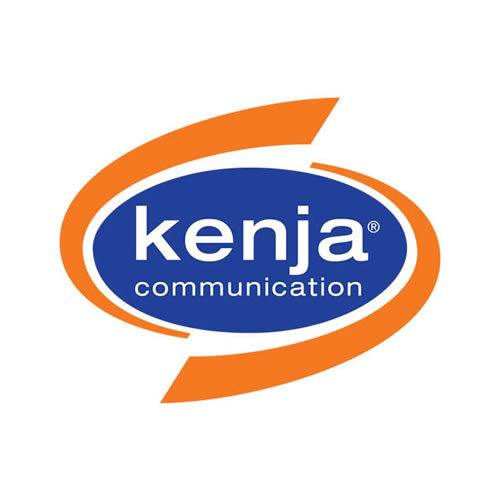
- Founded: 1982; 44 years ago
- Area served: Australia (Sydney, Canberra, Melbourne)
- Key people: Ken Dyers (co-founder); Jan Hamilton (co-founder) Cornelia Rau (High Profile Member)
- Website: www.kenja.com.au

Kenja Communication, or simply Kenja, is an Australian company co-founded in 1982 by Ken Dyers and his partner, Jan Hamilton. The word 'Kenja' is derived from the first letters of their names. There are four Kenja centres, in Sydney, Greater Western Sydney, Melbourne and Canberra. Kenja Communication runs classes, workshops and one-to-one sessions, as well as events and activities at different venues around Australia. It has gained public attention through court trials involving various members of the group, leader Ken Dyers' suicide following allegations of child sexual abuse, and the group's alleged involvement in the Cornelia Rau case.

== About Kenja ==
A former Liberal Party parliamentarian Stephen Mutch, with detailed knowledge of high-ranking members described Kenja as "a sinister organisation designed to fill the pockets and stroke the egos" under parliamentary privilege in the New South Wales Legislative Council in 1993.

=== National Redress Scheme ===
In July 2020 Kenja was named as one of six organisations that have failed to sign onto the National Redress Scheme for victims of institutional child sexual abuse.

At a hearing of the senate committee into the implementation of the National Redress Scheme former cult member Ms Ring told a senate committee that many adults who are still active in Kenja knew about and witnessed her abuse, including Ms Hamilton who also groomed and emotionally abused her as well. Her testimony was made under parliamentary privilege. A statement of reply on the Kenja website states "Jan Hamilton completely rejects as false, malicious and defamatory the statements made by Michelle Ring in the Federal Parliament. Those allegations were made in Parliament and so are accorded parliamentary privilege. All Ms Ring's allegations are completely denied. They are baseless and degrading."

=== Theatre documentary: Guilty Until Proven Innocent ===
For 10 years, Kenja has produced a theatre documentary called Guilty Until Proven Innocent in Sydney, Melbourne, and Canberra. The documentary purported to expose "a 15-year-long attack on Kenja and the reputation of Ken Dyers", and concludes the perceived attack on Dyers is part of a much wider attack on the "spiritual liberty" of the general public.

The Sydney Morning Herald reviewed the theatre documentary in the pair of articles "Abuse case: 'staff asked to lie'" and "Campaign to clear cult leader".

In the Downing Centre Local Court, on 26 August 2008, Magistrate R. Clisdell made the following observation about the documentary in his summary: "I find the lecture series to be a continuation of that harassment, in that a reasonable person in the position of (victim's name) could be harassed and intimidated by that performance".

The City of Melbourne cancelled the venue booking of the 2009 Kenja Eisteddfod. It created some controversy as Kenja claimed it was probably connected with the theatre documentary, scheduled to be shown after the event.

The theatre documentary continues to be shown in Melbourne, Canberra, and Sydney.

=== Scientology ===
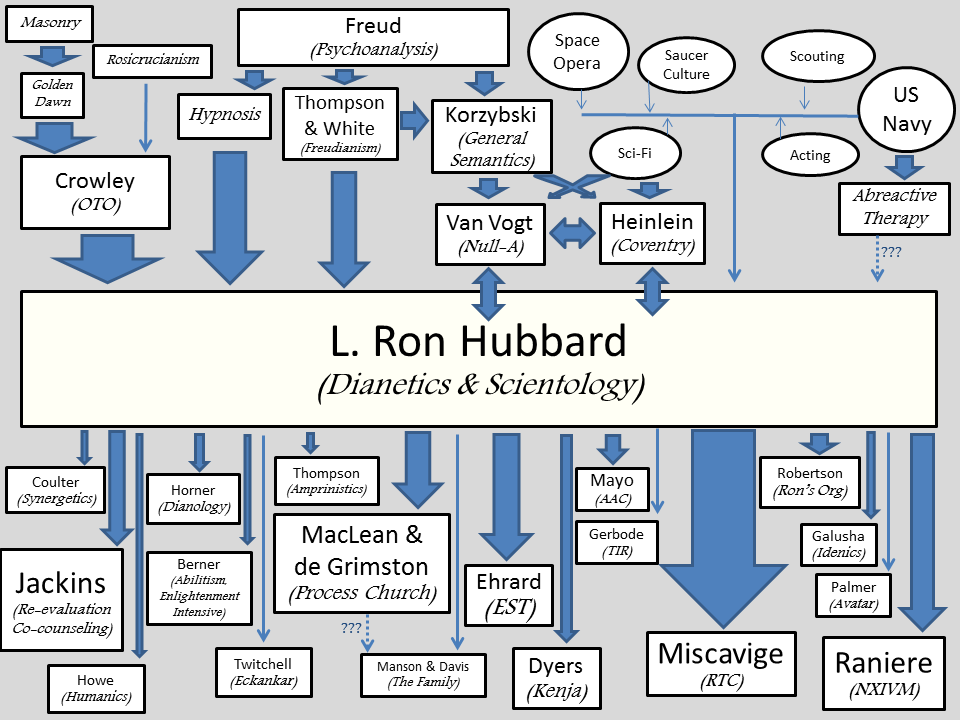
Hubbard's beliefs and practices, drawn from a diverse set of sources, influenced numerous offshoots, splinter groups, and new movements

Dyers joined the Church of Scientology but later left it. In a list published from the 1950s onwards by the organisation, Dyers is listed as a suppressive person. Kenja uses some Scientology techniques including training routine TR6, "Walk over to that wall".

=== Classification as a cult or sect ===
The Kenja group has been described as a cult by Robert Manne, eminent professor of politics at La Trobe University, and The Sydney Morning Herald.

== Controversies ==
=== Cornelia Rau ===
In 2005, a mentally ill former Kenja member, Cornelia Rau, gained widespread media attention in Australia due to being unlawfully detained for a period of 10 months by the Australian government. Before this, she had disappeared and later turned up in North Queensland, where Aboriginal people alerted the police after being concerned about her behaviour. She told them she was Anna Brotmeyer (and later Anna Schmidt) from Germany. Immigration officials assumed she was an illegal immigrant and failed to diagnose her schizophrenia, leading to her detention.

Her family accused Kenja of contributing to her declining mental health. A claim has been made that she developed schizophrenia during her time as a member of the group. Prior to her small involvement with Kenja between May and October 1998 during her 4-month off from working with Qantas, it was discovered that she already had this condition in 1996 (eight years prior to being picked up at Coen, Queensland in March 2004) with her family enduring her troubled journey with many psychotic episodes and was also great at masking her symptoms when she wanted to.

Hamilton denied any wrongdoing, saying: "We are not responsible for Cornelia's condition... we are not a cult. It's a witch-hunt." Rau's sister, other family members, and several members of Kenja present at the time formed a different opinion while observing Rau's involvement in the group. Hamilton also claimed, retrospectively, Rau was "scattered, disassociated" as a member of the group, and that she was asked to leave because she needed help and the group "couldn't help her". However, witnesses quoted in the media say she was humiliated and expelled. The claim has been made that Rau was driven to the airport on the night of the Melbourne Eisteddfod, put on an aeroplane to Sydney, and told never to return to the group. Three days later she was picked up by New South Wales police driving on the wrong side of the road.

Rau was incarcerated in the German psychiatric system following a trip while on a medication vacation in October 2008. In February 2009, Rau was arrested and imprisoned in Jordan after behaving erratically and refusing to pay bills.

=== Richard Leape ===
A male member of Kenja named Richard Leape, who was being treated for schizophrenia, disappeared around 1993 and has not been seen since. His sister, Annette, says she once found him in the street "totally paranoid and irrational, saying Nazis were going to get him". She was concerned that many other people had "developed very serious mental illnesses" from their time in Kenja, and said she was "appalled" to know Kenja still exists.

=== Michael Beaver ===
A young man who was a Kenja member for two years, Michael Beaver, was also diagnosed with (and hospitalised for) chronic schizophrenia. He blamed Kenja, and said he had heard of four other people who had severe problems since leaving Kenja. Beaver later killed himself, writing in his suicide note that Kenja was "partly to blame".

=== Stephen Mutch ===
In 2010, The Sydney Morning Herald reported that in 1994 Kenja had directed one of its members to make false allegations of sexual assault against Stephen Mutch, a prominent opponent of the organisation. The woman alleged that Mutch had assaulted her in 1978, although police and prosecutors declined to lay charges. Anonymous letters were sent to the media and Mutch's colleagues, and members of Kenja also disrupted his wedding. The woman's ex-boyfriend provided a statutory declaration to the Sydney Morning Herald that she had admitted fabricating the allegations, and her mother also agreed that the allegations were false.

== Apprehended violence orders ==
Two apprehended violence order (AVO)-related court cases involving senior Kenja members have come before the courts.

Senior members of Kenja Communication were cross-examined in a court case involving a father and his daughter, who made serious charges of sexual molestation against Dyers. The Kenja members' claim to have been assaulted by the father was rejected by the court and the charges against the man were dropped.

Jan Hamilton was cross-examined in a court case involving an alleged attempt to threaten a young girl, who had made serious sexual allegations against her husband, Ken Dyers, prior to his suicide. On 26 August 2008, the young lady, formerly a member of the Kenja group, successfully secured an AVO against the co-founder of the group. Jan Hamilton was ordered not to stalk, harass, or intimidate the woman as part of a two-year AVO. The magistrate forwarded details of the trial to the attorney general, requesting an investigation on criminal grounds for perverting the course of justice. Hamilton vigorously denied the allegations and indicated she would appeal against the decision, but no appeal was made to the AVO and she was ordered to pay the legal costs of the victim, totalling $37,500.

== Popular culture ==
The Kenja group was the subject of the 2008 documentary Beyond Our Ken, directed by Luke Walker and Melissa Maclean. The film was nominated for Best Documentary in 2008 by the Australian Film Institute and Film Critics Circle of Australia. Beyond Our Ken was voted the third-most popular documentary at the Melbourne International Film Festival.

The international premiere of Beyond Our Ken at Toronto's Hot Docs Canadian International Documentary Festival generated controversy when Kenja flew from Australia to protest at the screenings.

Network 10 reported that a Department of Defence spokesperson had made the following statement in relation to the yearly advertisements placed in Fairfax Press newspapers: "The Army will contact Kenja Communication shortly to issue a notice to cease and desist using the Army's Rising Sun badge".

The Australian Broadcasting Corporation and Screen Australia produced an original drama series called Stateless. It was inspired by the Cornelia Rau case and depicted the main character escaping a suburban cult, but never directly named the organisation.
