= Tjunti =

Soakage in the Northern Territory, Australia

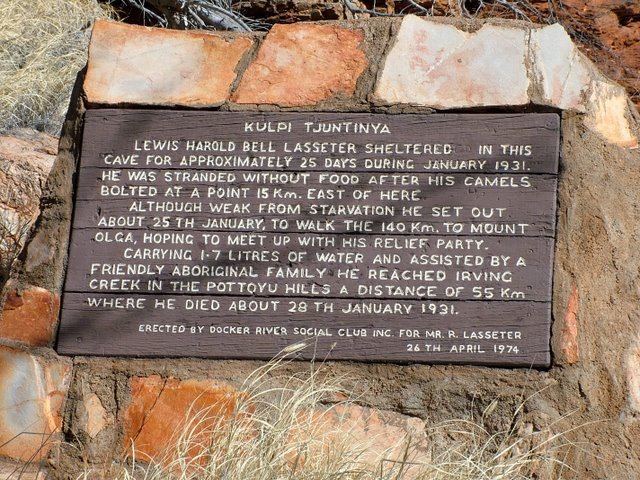
Plaque outside Lasseter's Cave recounting the tale of Lasseter's death.

Tjunti is a soakage site near Kaḻṯukatjara, in the Northern Territory of Australia. It is located where the Hull River cuts through the Petermann Ranges, about 36 kilometres (22 mi) to the southeast of Kaḻṯukatjara, 41 km (25 mi) by road along the Tjukaruru Road. Tjunti is known as the site where the famous gold prospector Harold B. Lasseter took refuge on his fatal search for Lasseter's Reef. An outstation was established here in 1977, and belongs to a Pitjantjatjara family.

The gap in the mountains is formed here by the Hull River, a sandy creek that remains dry for most of the year. It splits the Curdie Range in the south from the Mannanana Range in the north. There are several soaks and rockholes in the area.

== Lasseter's Cave ==
Lasseter's Cave
- Kuḻpi Tjuntinya
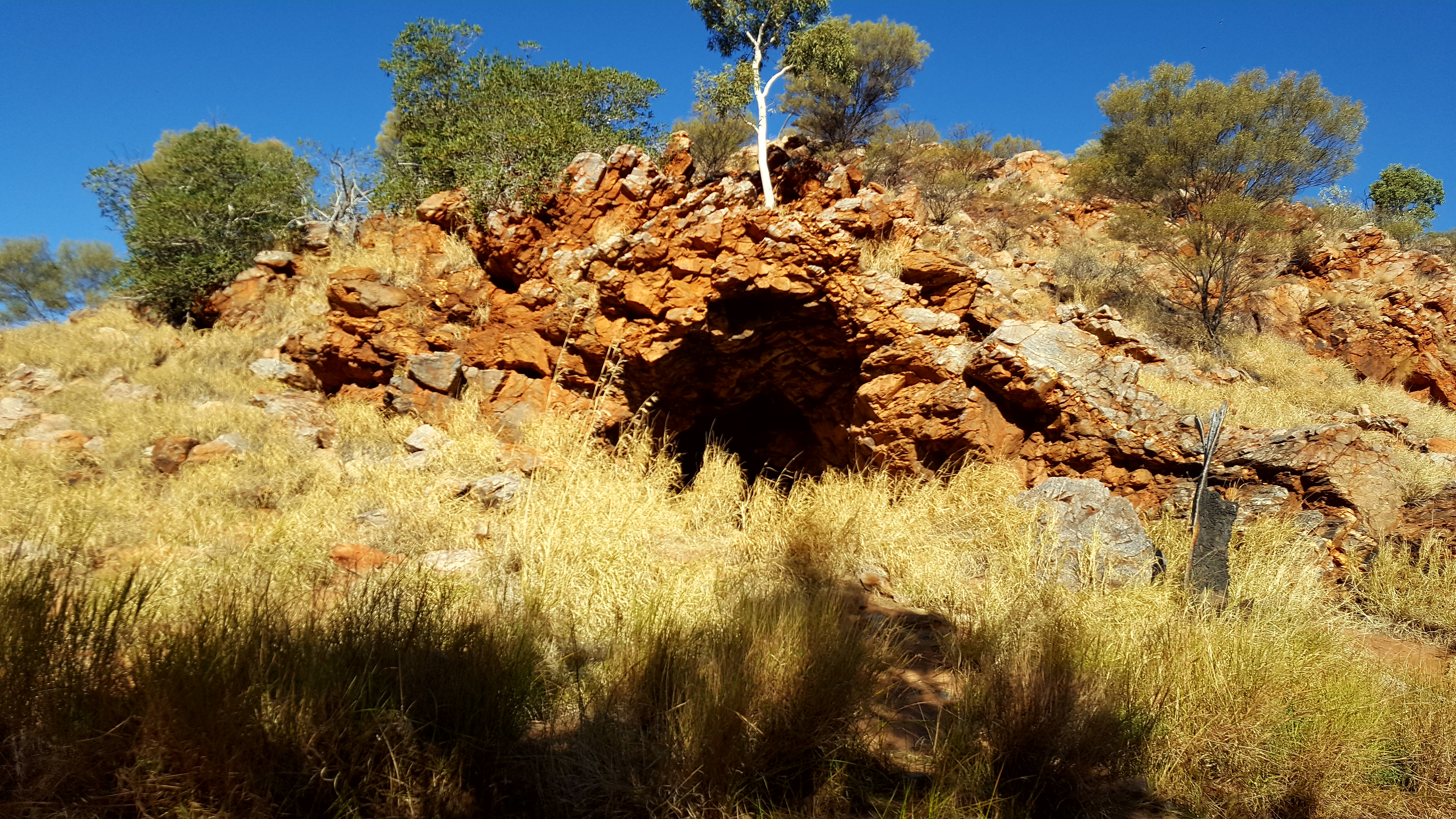
- Entry to Kuḻpi Tjuntinya, commonly known as Lasseter's Cave.
- Interactive map of Lasseter's Cave
- Location: Northern Territory, Australia
- Coordinates: 25°1′12.20″S 129°23′44.28″E

The small cave where Lasseter took refuge is Kuḻpi Tjuntinya (commonly called Lasseter's Cave in English). This is an opening in a rock formation in the Mannanana Range. Lasseter took shelter here for about 25 days during January 1931, when trying to find a rich gold deposit that he claimed to have discovered in the area on an earlier expedition. His camels had deserted him, and he was stranded in the bush without food. While taking shelter in the cave, Lasseter recorded his account of his journey, including the days spent in the cave. He was later found by a local Pitjantjatjara family, who provided him food and water before Lasseter decided to leave the cave and attempt to walk the 140 km (87 mi) to Kata Tjuṯa. He was weak from dehydration, malnutrition and exhaustion, and he died three days later, after walking about 55 km (34 mi).
