= Lewis Harold Bell Lasseter =

Australian gold prospector (1880–c. 1931)

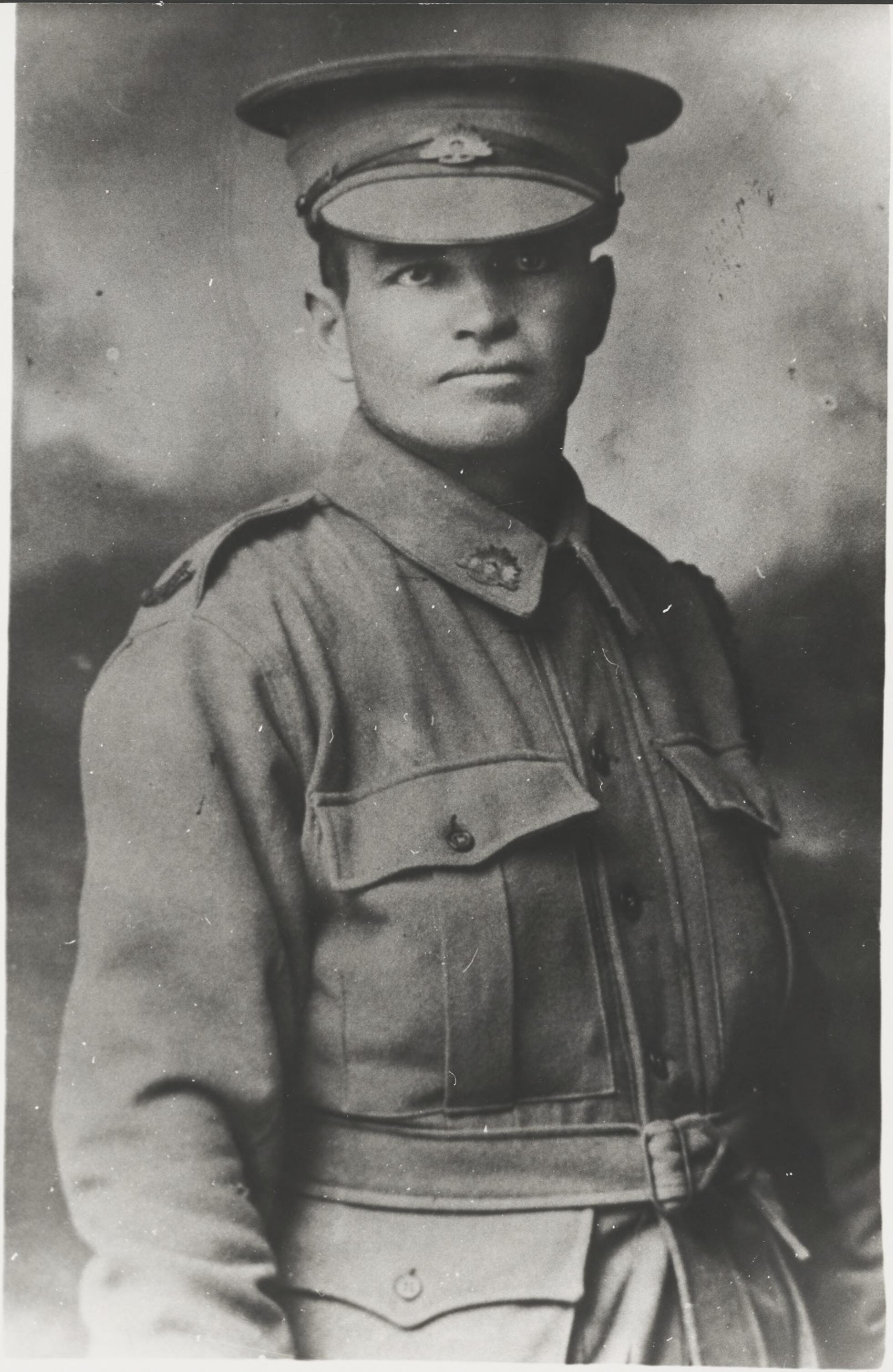
- Lasseter in the uniform of the First AIF c. 1915
- Born: Lewis Hubert Lasseter; 27 September 1880; Bamganie, Victoria, Australia
- Died: c. 31 January 1931 (aged 50); Tjunti, Northern Territory
- Resting place: Alice Springs Cemetery, Alice Springs, NT, Australia
- Known for: claiming to discover Lasseter's Reef
- Children: Bob Lasseter

Lewis Harold Bell Lasseter (27 September 1880 – c. 31 January 1931), also known as Harold Lasseter, was an Australian gold prospector who claimed to have found a fabulously rich gold reef in central Australia, subsequently known as Lasseter's Reef.

== Life ==
Lasseter was born in 1880 at Bamganie, Victoria. Self-educated, he was literate and well-spoken, and commonly described as eccentric and opinionated. He travelled in both Australia and the United States and worked in a variety of occupations, marrying twice and fathering five children.

Lasseter twice enlisted in the First Australian Imperial Force. In 1916, he joined the reinforcements for the 3rd Pioneer Battalion being raised in Melbourne but was discharged before leaving Australia after repeatedly going AWOL. In 1917, he enlisted again, this time in Adelaide, but was discharged as medically unfit for service following a brawl, again without leaving Australia.

== Lasseter's Reef ==
Lasseter was made famous by his sensational claim, first asserted in 1929, that, as a young man, he had discovered a fabulously rich gold reef, an entity now known as "Lasseter's Reef", in central Australia.

He perished in the desert near the Western Australia–Northern Territory border in early 1931 after he separated himself from an expedition (CAGE I) that was mounted in an effort to rediscover the supposed reef. His body was found and reburied in Lasseter's Cave in March 1931 by Bob Buck, a central Australian bushman and pastoralist sent to search for Lasseter. Buck was accompanied by Ernest Gustav Brandon-Cremer a recruited photographer of the CAGE II Expedition to discover the body of Lasseter. In December 1957 Lowell Thomas and Lee Robinson re-interred the body in the Alice Springs cemetery.

Fred Blakeley, leader of Lasseter's 1930 expedition, branded Lasseter a charlatan who ripped off his investors in a clever scheme to convince them that such a gold reef existed. Blakeley even claimed that Lasseter did not die in Central Australia but escaped to America. This claim was rejected in Lasseter Did Not Lie by A. Stapleton (published in Adelaide, 1981). With a plethora of contradictory statements over the years, it is now difficult or impossible to separate history from myth with regard to Harry Lasseter.

== In popular culture ==
Australian author Ion Idriess published Lasseter's Last Ride in 1931 telling the story of the 1930 expedition and Lasseter's death based on interviews and Lasseter's letters.

Lasseter is referenced in the song "Warakurna" on the 1987 Aboriginal rights-themed album Diesel and Dust by Australian rock band Midnight Oil.

His story was the subject of the non-fiction "The Search for Harold Lasseter : The true story of the man behind the myths" by Murray Hubbard (1993)

Luke Walker's 2013 documentary feature Lasseter's Bones explores the life and legend of Lasseter and documents the filmmaker's many attempts to locate the legendary Lasseter's Reef. The film also follows Lasseter's elderly son Bob on his last desert expedition to find his father's lost gold and explores the many complex strands of the Lasseter mystery. Lasseter's Bones was nominated for Best Documentary at the Film Critics Circle of Australia Awards.

In January 2017, an episode of Expedition Unknown on the American Travel Channel, titled "Lasseter's Gold", examined the mystery.

The artist Nora Abbott, a Pitjantjatjara and Western Arrernte woman, has painted scenes from Lasseter's life, based on the perspective of the An̲angu who met him.

== Legacy ==
- Lasseter's Cave, Northern Territory
- Lasseter Highway, Northern Territory
- Lasseters Hotel Casino, Alice Springs, Northern Territory
