= Henbury Station =

Pastoral lease in Northern Territory

Coordinates: 24.55293°S 133.25237°E

Location in Northern Territory

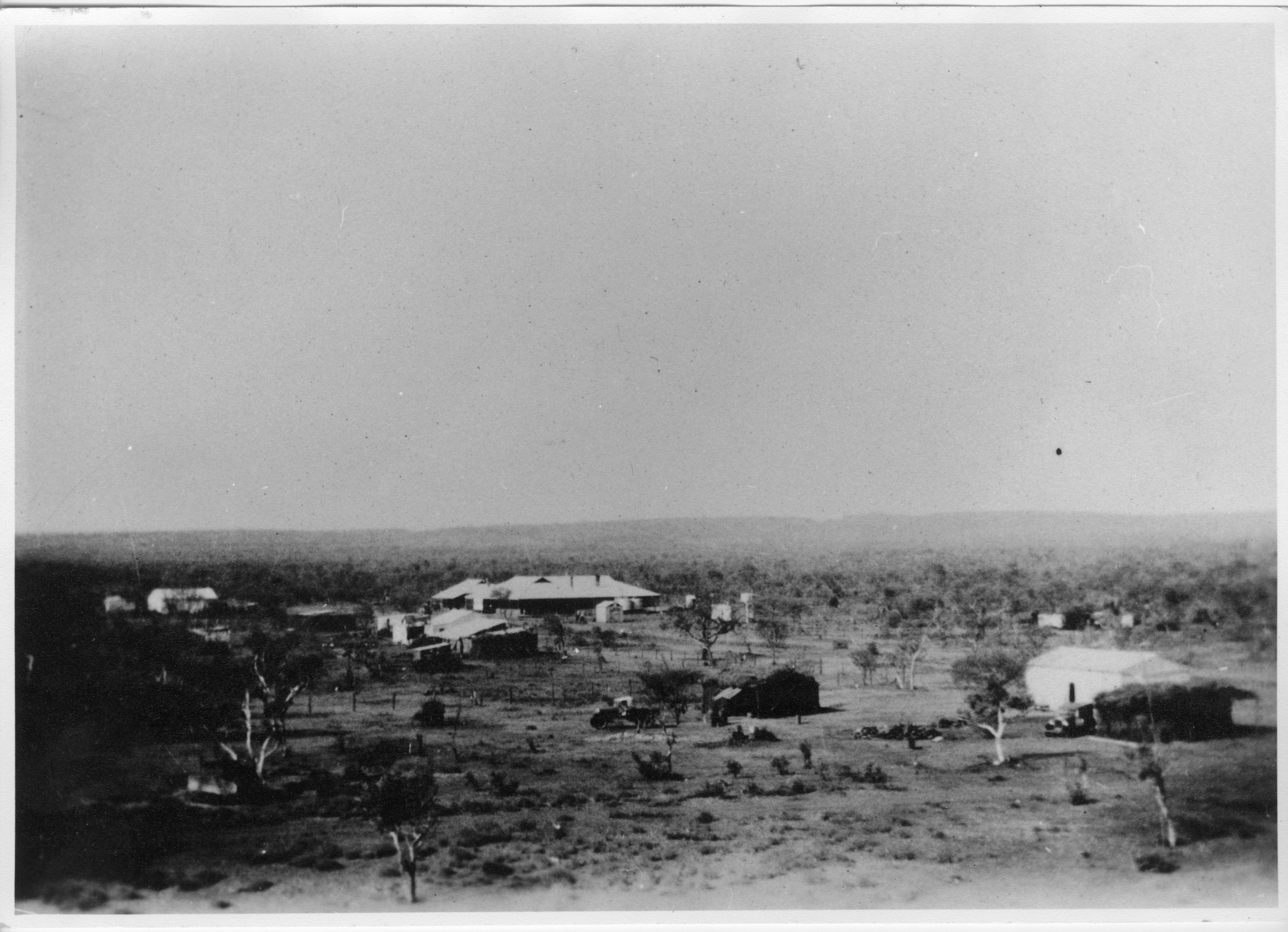
Henbury Station in 1955

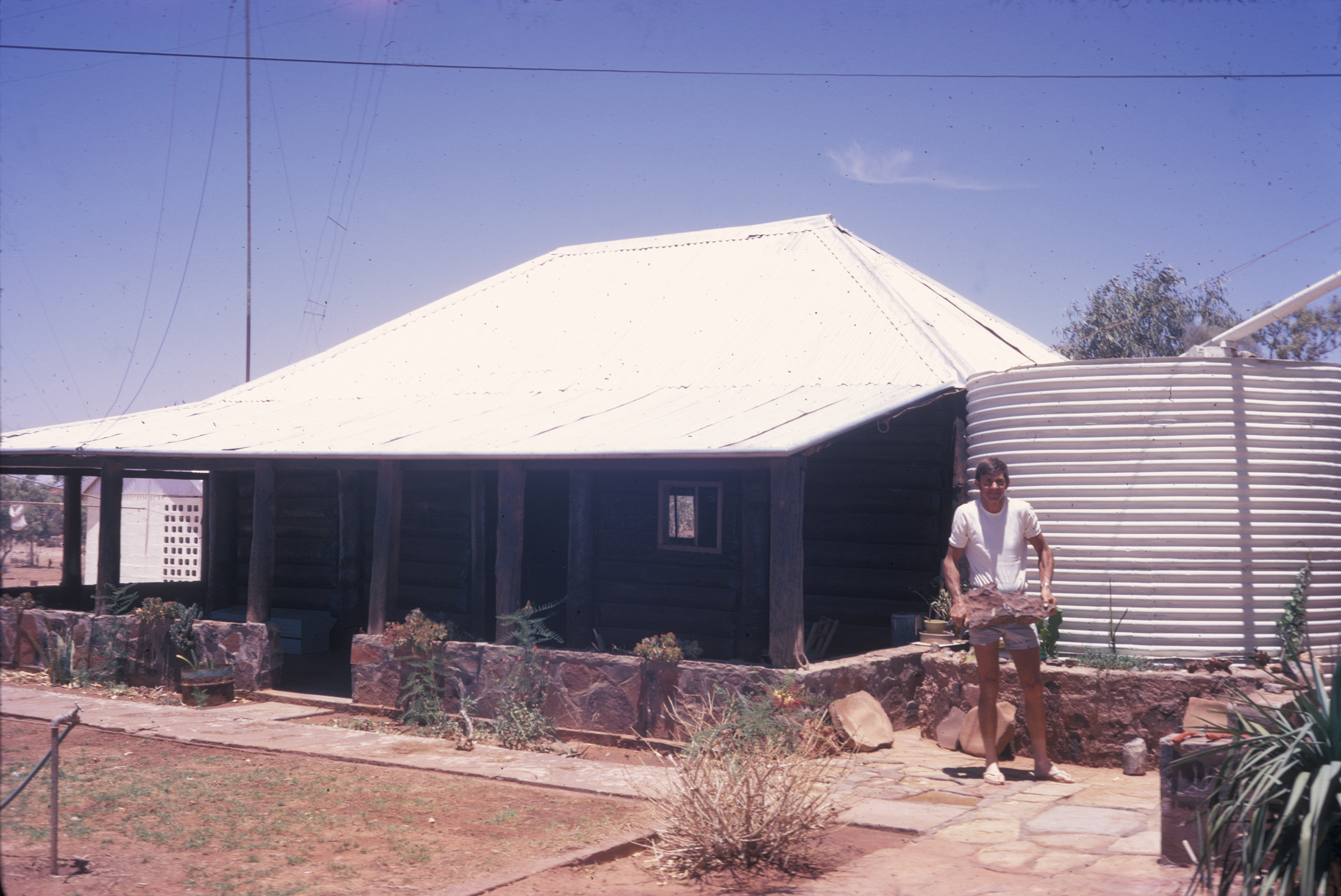
The homestead at Henbury Station c.1971

The historic homestead at Henbury Station

Rain at Henbury Station

R.M. Williams Agricultural Holdings' David Pearse announces the sale of Henbury Station in 2011

Henbury Station is a cattle station in the Northern Territory of Australia. In March 2022 Henbury was purchased by Tim Edmunds for A$32 million, including its 3500 cattle.

== Description ==
It is situated about 130 kilometres (81 mi) south of Alice Springs in the Northern Territory.

Henbury occupies an area of 5,273 square kilometres (2,036 sq mi) that extends from the tops of the MacDonnell Ranges, down the foothills and across the open red plains to the Finke bioregion. The Finke River runs for about 100 kilometres (62 mi) through the property and has carved out many gorges containing permanent waterholes. The property encompasses the dissected uplands and the lower valleys of both the Finke and Palmer Rivers. The region is characterised by the perennial freshwater wetlands such as Running Waters, 3-mile, Snake hole and Harts Camp that are regionally significant and the oldest wetlands in Central Australia supporting the unique biodiversity of the area.

There are twelve land systems at Henbury the most prevalent of which is the Simpson's system where the landscape is dominated by spinifex on sand dunes with sparse shrubs and low trees or Desert Oak over grasses on sand dunes Mulga, coolibah or sparse low trees over copper-burr, samphire or saltbush growing in the swales. The most productive land system is Chandler's which is widespread through the property which includes mesas, low ranges, clayey stony slopes, bluebush rises and open woodlands.

== History ==
The traditional owners of Henbury Station and surrounding lands are the Pertame (southern Aranda people). They continue to live in the region and have an ongoing relationship to Henbury Station.

Parke and Walker applied for a lease for the area in 1875, naming it after their family estate in Dorset, England. The first homestead was constructed along Ellery Creek in 1877 and the 2,130 square miles (5,517 km^{2}) was theirs. A log cabin was built along the banks of the Finke River in 1886 which became the new homestead and still stands today, the property was carrying 3,000 head of cattle in the same year.

Both Henbury and Todmorden Station were owned by E. W. Parke when he died in 1901.

In about 1902 the Joseph Breaden acquired the leasehold and experienced good falls of rain later the same year ensuring water and feed for stock for the next 12 months. During Breadens ownership the property was managed by his nephew Bob Buck. Breaden later sold Henbury and Todmorden Station to Stan Young in 1923. The Braedens had made several improvements to both runs since they were acquired, and had agreed to stay on at Todmorden for the next 12 months. Young later went bankrupt seven years later and handed the property back to the Breadens.

From 1956 through to 1957 Henbury and surrounding properties were struck by drought in which Henbury lost 4,000 cattle. The drought eventually broke in late 1957 when heavy rains fell causing localised flooding. The area experienced heavy rains in 1967 which caused the Finke River to flood closing roads around the property for a week.

Ross Morton and Sally Williams purchased Henbury in 1982 as part of a family partnership. They placed the property on the market in 2011, after more than 30 years there.

=== Carbon farming ===
On 27 July 2011 it was announced that Henbury Station had been sold to R.M. Williams Agricultural Holdings, a subsidiary company to boot maker RM Williams, managed by David Pearse. Henbury was purchased for A$13 million with A$9 million of funding from the Australian Government's Caring for Country initiative. The property, which formerly had 17,000 head of cattle, was destocked, allowing native vegetation to regenerate. The property was to be protected as part of the National Reserve System. By restoring native vegetation, R.M.Williams Agricultural Holdings planned to sequester carbon and then sell carbon credits. If successful, it would have been the first company to use the carbon market to fund a conservation project.

Some Aboriginal traditional owners were opposed to the sale, saying there was a lack of consultation. They wanted the representative body, the Central Land Council, to purchase back their land and continue to run the pastoral lease as a cattle station. The project also faced growing resistance from the local cattle industry. Neighbouring pastoralists said the property was not being effectively managed for fire and feral animals, increasing the risk for adjacent cattle stations. Some scientists also questioned the scientific validity of carbon sequestration in rangeland regions.

In October 2012, R.M. Williams Agricultural Holdings re-structured the project, partnering with carbon finance company C-Quest Capital. It said it would be changing focus to include the reintroduction of cattle on some parts of the station, producing a mixed carbon farming model.

R. M. Williams Agricultural Holdings went into receivership in July 2013, with PPB Advisory appointed as receiver.

Henbury Station was put back on the market in August 2013. In July 2014 Henbury was acquired by Ashley and Neville Anderson and David Rohan under trading name Henbury Unit Trust Pty Ltd for between A$7–8 million. The station was running about 6000 head of cattle in 2015. It was later revealed that a large percentage of the sale price would be recovered by the Australian Government. Former owners Ross Morton and Sally Williams claim to have lost $4.5 million in shares after the collapse of R.M. Williams Agricultural Holdings.

Approximately 20% of the property is now protected under a special conservation covenant. The new covenant includes Running Waters, which is one of the largest permanent waterholes in Central Australia, as well as habitat linking Finke Gorge National Park and Owen Springs Conservation Reserve.

== See also ==
- Protected areas of the Northern Territory
- List of ranches and stations
- List of the largest stations in Australia
