= Ernest Gustav Brandon-Cremer =

New Zealand-Australian moviemaker, newsman and explorer (1895-1957)

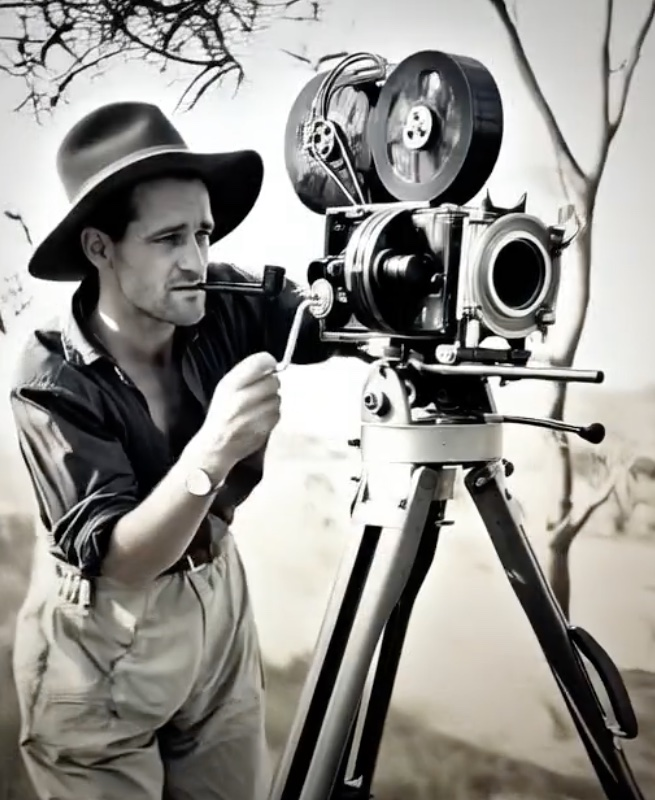
EBC self-portrait 1922

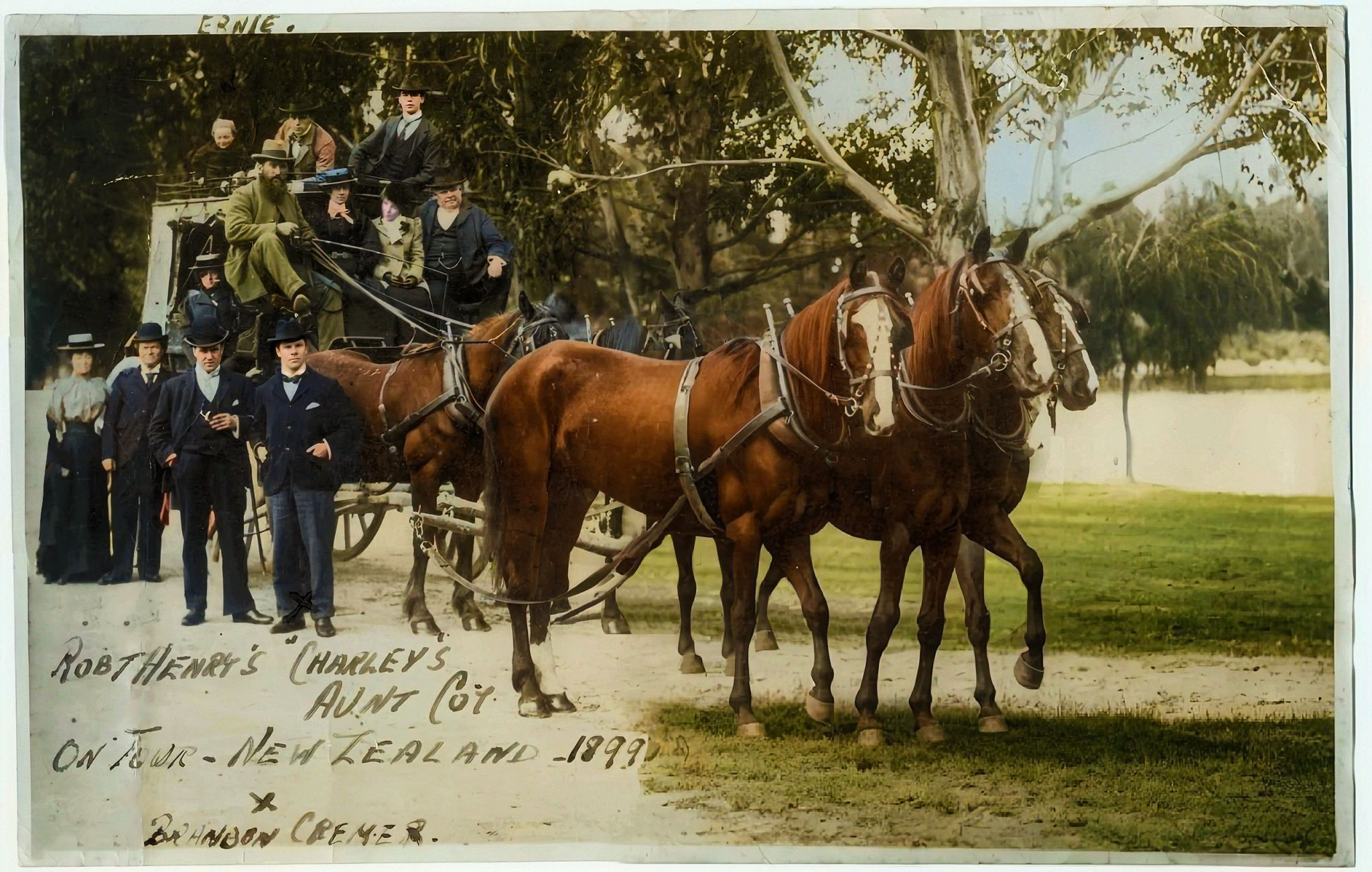
Robert Henry Theatrical Company, 1899 New Zealand. Ernest is the small boy atop the rear of the carriage

Ernest Gustav Brandon-Cremer (15 February 1895 – 1 March 1957) was a New Zealand/Australian moviemaker, newsman, explorer and adventurer. He was a key figure in Australian aviation history, and was especially known for his documentation of Lasseter's Gold Reef as well as his photography of the Solar eclipse of 21 September 1922 at Wallal, Australia.

== Early life ==
In Dunedin, New Zealand, Brandon-Cremer was born to Albert Wilhelm Anton Brandon-Cremer and Annie Beaton in a theatrical family, his parents traversing New Zealand and Australia by horse and carriage over several decades in the early days of vaudeville in Australasia.

His childhood was marked by a never-present father and an alcoholic mother, a marriage soon to be dissolved with the children abandoned to the State. Brandon-Cremer ran away from home at age 11 and had to fend for himself. Brandon-Cremer claims that he was taken in by a travelling American minister working in Hong Kong before he ended up in the US and finally in Hollywood. Ernest was interviewed in 1926 by a Sydney Cinema Magazine, where these missing years were described in great detail.

Ernest travelled around North America working for the Vitagraph Company of America as an assistant camera man working on such silent films as 'Captain Alvarez', 'Memories That Haunt', 'The Juggernaut', The Wills of the Gods' and 'The Barrier'.

In 1913, he was tried in Adelaide for breaking and entering, including theft, and sentenced to 18 months in prison. A later court visit for vagrancy in June 1915 showed he was now in Melbourne. In both instances he listed his profession as cinematographer.

Newspaper notices and advertisements show that Brandon-Cremer worked as a cinematographer with A. C. Tinsdale starting in 1915, a relationship that would last many years, and would benefit him greatly. In May 1917 Brandon-Cremer became second wireless operator aboard the Steamship 'Boonah' as he headed for the UK. In August 1917 he joined the British Garrison Artillery (BGA), part of the UK Royal Horse Artillery as a gunner (serial no. 198613). It seems he never saw active service over his 18 months with the BGA, but did qualify for several medals. In press interviews later in life, Brandon-Cremer said he was "associated" with the R.A.F. and consequently saw service with the British North Russian Relief Force in Russia during the Allied intervention in the Russian Civil War, and took part in the evacuation of Archangel in northern Russia) in late 1919 He has stated he earned the Distinguished Flying Cross,(not verified) (evidence of his flying ability can be found in the short travelogue 'In and Around MacKay' (1933), where he is seen in the cockpit flying above MacKay).

Upon his BGA discharge in February 1919, Brandon-Cremer started a 15-month stint with the London YMCA as a cinematographer. Two months later, on 19 April, he married Minnie Henrietta Warren. Minnie, age 22, from London. He listed his occupation as Film Operator. It seems Minnie died the following year.

In June 1920 Brandon-Cremer went to work in South Africa for a year making short films for the South African Film Trust. On 11 July 1921 he returned to the UK aboard the RMS 'Kinfauns' from South Africa (according to Ancestry.com records).

== The Spanish Foreign Legion, 1921 ==
In August 1921, Brandon-Cremer travelled to Spain to join the Spanish Legion fighting the Moors (Rif) in North Africa, and participated in 11 battles. He was repatriated to the UK in November, giving interviews to the British press, representing himself as the only Australian (New Zealander) to join the Spanish Legion. He later claimed to have been under the command of then Capt. Francisco Franco (subsequent dictator of Spain).

His accounts of the ill treatment of British recruits to the Spanish Legion were widely reported in American, British and Australian newspapers. Upon reading such reports, his former business partner, A. C. Tinsdale started a campaign to return Brandon-Cremer to Australia. It seems that this was accomplished as Brandon-Cremer returned to Albany, Western Australia aboard Euripides on 9 March 1922.

== The Eclipse at Wallal, Western Australia, 1922 ==
Wallal, Western Australia was the chosen location for a visiting US Lick Observatory party of Astronomers, led by W. W. Campbell, to view the upcoming Solar eclipse of 21 September 1922. The purpose of the expedition to view stellar transits of the Sun's disk during the eclipse to measure and verify Albert Einstein's Theory of relativity. Wallal was preferred for its isolation from man-made light sources, its propensity for clear skies and its location to gain the longest eclipse duration.

Brandon-Cremer, along with his business partner C. A. Sharpe were hired to document the expedition in both still photography and moving picture film. Hundreds of images from the team are kept at the archives of the University of California, Santa Cruz (donated by the Lick Observatory), and a second source of photos are kept at the Western Australia archives in Perth. A film made by Brandon-Cremer entitled Astronomers and Aborigines was distributed globally to showcase the Eclipse of 1922.

A very young Sir Charles Kingsford Smith was the pilot of the Western Australian Airways Bristol Type 28 Coupe Tourers plane (G-AUDF) that made bi-weekly mail drops to the Astronomers during the expedition. Kingsford-Smith took Brandon-Cremer aloft to shoot aerial footage of the camp, which was later used in the film previously mentioned.

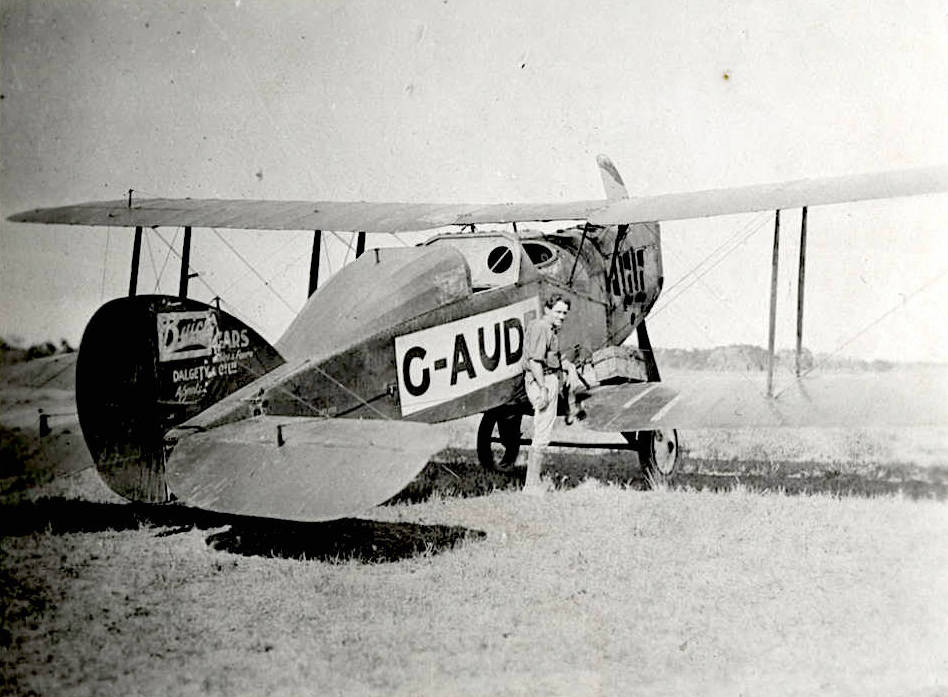
Brandon-Cremer self taken image alongside Kingsford-Smiths biplane at Wallal

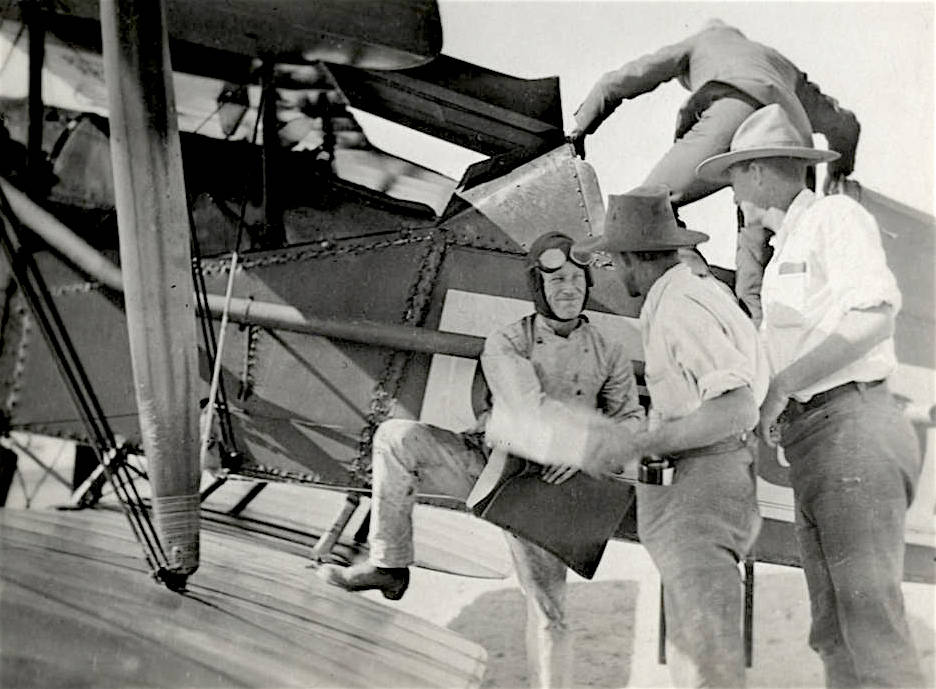
Charles Kingsford Smith at Wallal

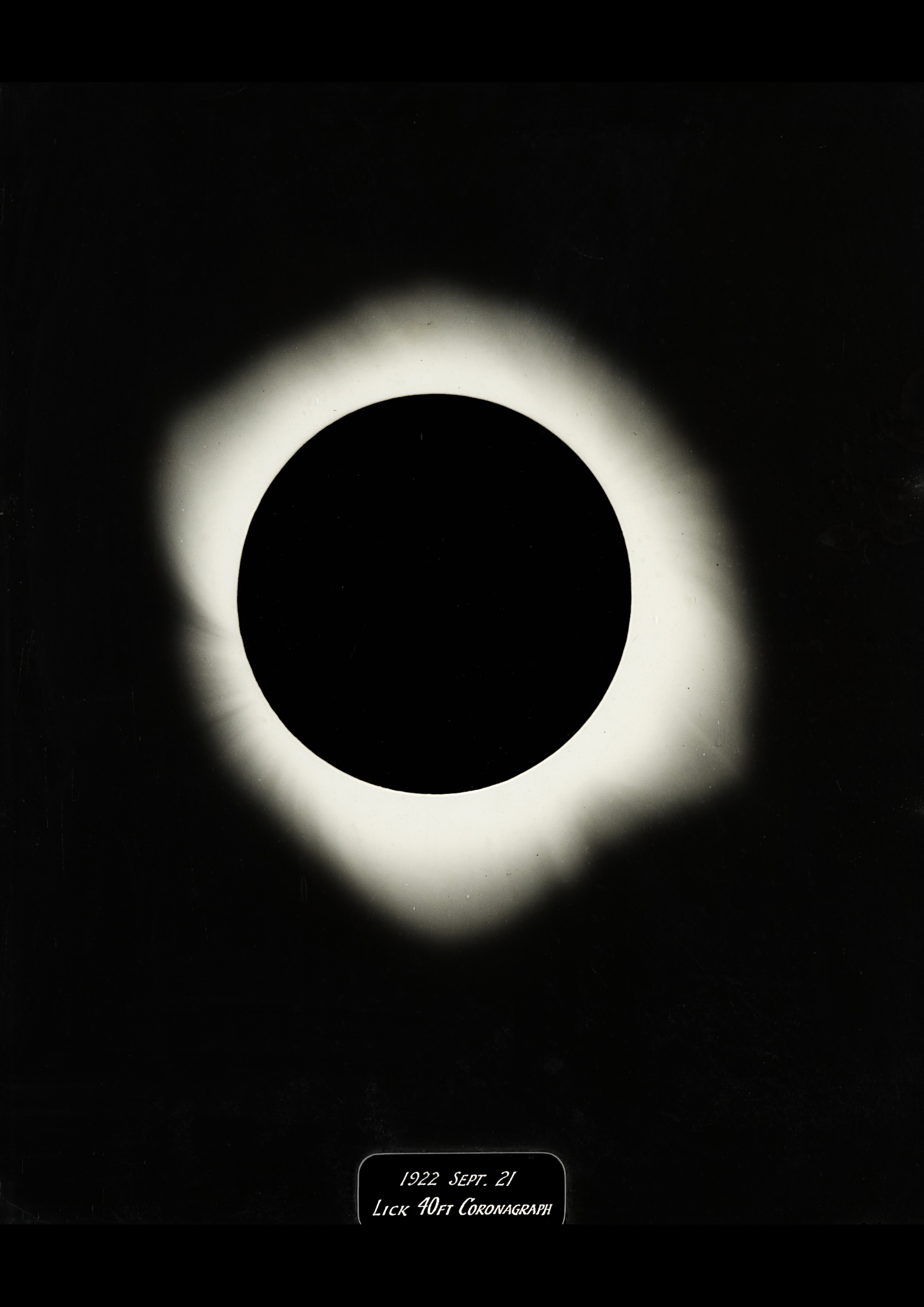
1922 Solar eclipse photographic plate taken at Wallal

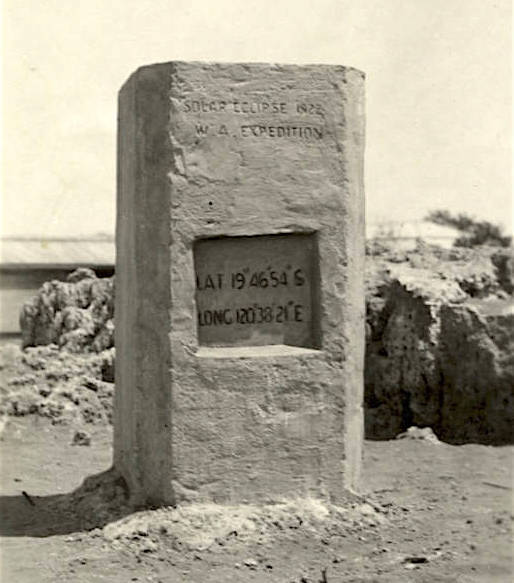
Eclipse Marker at Wallal, Western Australia

== The 1920s and aerial exploits ==
During the 1920s Brandon-Cremer was working for Paramount Studios in Australia as a cameraman and filmmaker, he produced such films as 'Java: The Garden of the East' (only the script exists of this movie); Other films included 'Nursery Rhymes' with his father at Bronte Beach, Sydney and 'British Quality Triumphant' in 1925. A film about automobiles, motorcycles, trucks, tractors and aircraft built in Britain and transported for sale in Australia.

On 15 July 1925, Brandon-Cremer married a second time to Sara Inez Vera Bell in Queensland. Sara lost a newborn son, Anthony Brandon-Cremer on 14 March 1926, also in Queensland. The marriage dissolved shortly after.

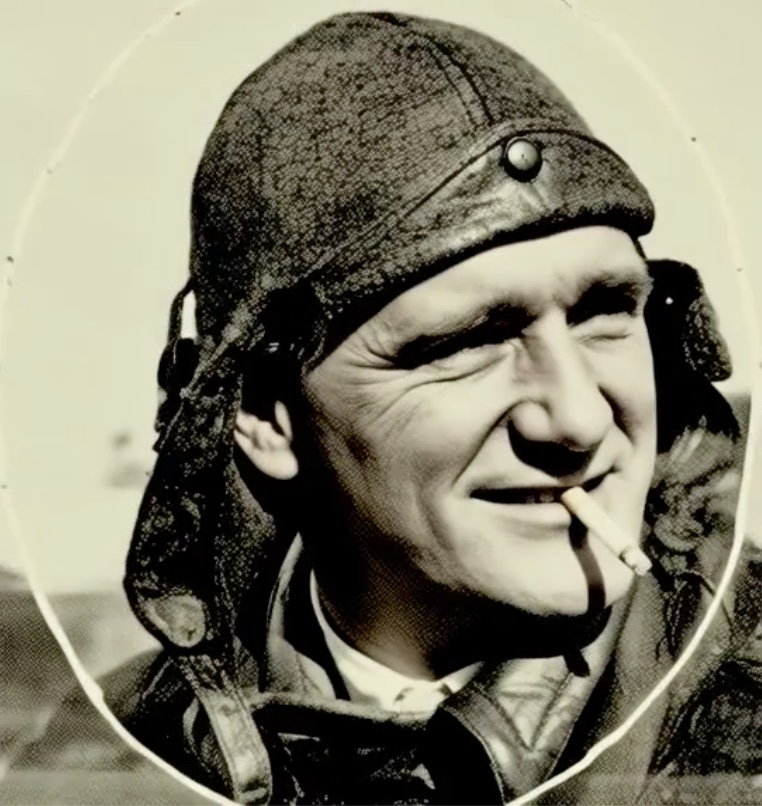
Ernest Brandon-Cremer survives a bi-plane crash into Sydney Harbour, 1928

Brandon-Cremer was active in covering aviation news and filming scenes in flight. He was instrumental in covering the arrival of the Southern Cross on its journey on the first Trans-Pacific flight to Australia in 1928, piloted by his friend Charles Kingsford Smith. Later that year while covering the arrival of the 'British Super-marines' of the Royal Air Force from London to Sydney, he and his pilot Sturt Griffith ditched into Sydney Harbour. Both men suffered minor injuries. Six months later Brandon-Cremer was the observer for Gypsy-Moth deliveries between Melbourne and Sydney. Another newspaper article mentions his participation on filming the departure of the aeroplane 'Canberra' (de Havilland Giant Moth), an aerial expedition sent out to find the missing 'Southern Cross', piloted by Kingsford-Smith, on its attempted trip from Sydney to London. Finally, Brandon-Cremer was included in a ride along on the Vellore aeroplane journey from London to Sydney.

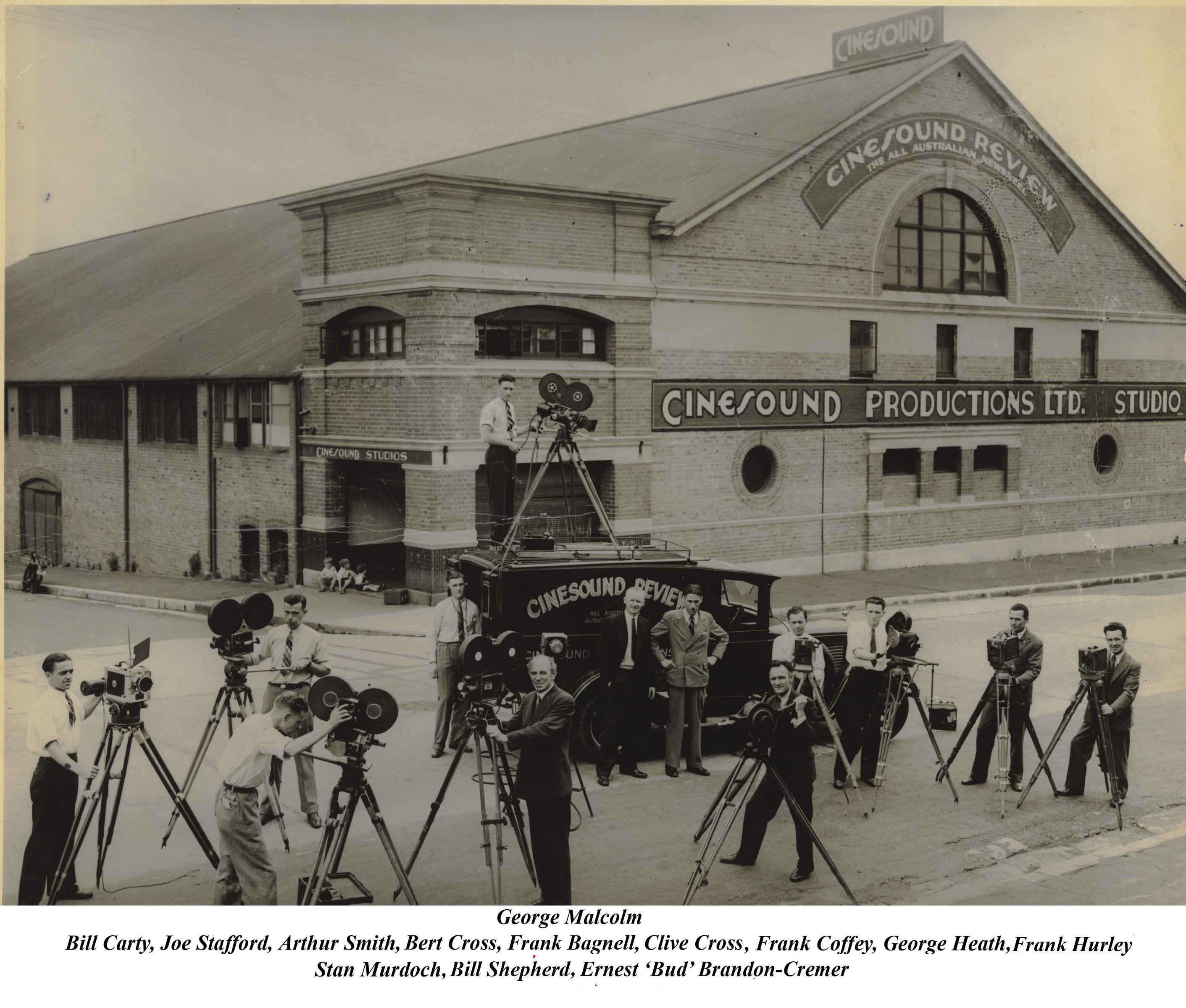
Ernest Brandon-Cremer with the Cinesound crew Bondi Junction 1930

== Cinesound newsreels, 1930s ==
Brandon-Cremer worked for the newsreel producers Cinesound during the 1930s.

Cinesound was a competitor to Movietone News. The Cinesound studio was based in Bondi Junction, Sydney.

The Cinesound cadre of cinematographers included Bill Carty, Joe Stafford, Arthur Smith, Bert Cross, Frank Bagnell, Clive Cross, Frank Coffey, George Heath, Frank Hurley, Stan Murdoch, Bill Shepherd and George Malcolm.

== Lasseter's Reef of Gold, 1931 ==
The gold prospector Lewis Harold Bell Lasseter had become famous by telling the story of his outback survival and discovery of a massive reef of surface gold near Uluru, Northern Territory. Members of the Sydney Stock Exchange organised the 'Central Australian Gold Exploration' Company (CAGE) to venture outback and rediscover this find. Camel trains and aircraft were sent out to scour the surrounds. One night during the expedition, Lasseter on camelback disappeared into the dark. After a futile search the party returned to Sydney.

A second Expedition was organised called CAGE-II. In August 1931, while working for Cinesound, 'Bud' signed-on with the Central Australian Gold Exploration Company (CAGE-II) to produce all the photography and a documentary film for a search party expedition to attempt to find Lasseter and his fabled reef of gold. The party to be led by local Bob Buck, a close friend of Brandon-Cremer.

The party left Alice Springs on Camel back en route to Uluru and the Western Ranges. A few hundred kilometres west of Uluru they discovered a tree with inscriptions and directions, left by Lasseter, to a river and cave. Upon digging a short while, Buck and Brandon-Cremer discovered the bones of Harold Lasseter, and his diary. A subsequent search did not find the fabled reef of gold. The story has become Australian folklore and some still believe the reef of gold exists.

Some of Brandon-Cremer's photos were later published in the chronicle of Lasseter's Last Ride by Ion L. Idriess. The Mitchell Library in Sydney retains some of the photos taken during the expedition.

Prior to the CAGE-II Expedition as it was called, 'Bud' was credited in the Sydney Sunday Guardian, in August 1931 – "Mr. Ernest Brandon-Cremer is the photographer. A complete moving picture record of the expedition's activities is to be taken by Mr. Cremer, who comes from Hollywood." He was also referenced for this Lasseter connection in the Horden House Encyclopedia of Exploration.

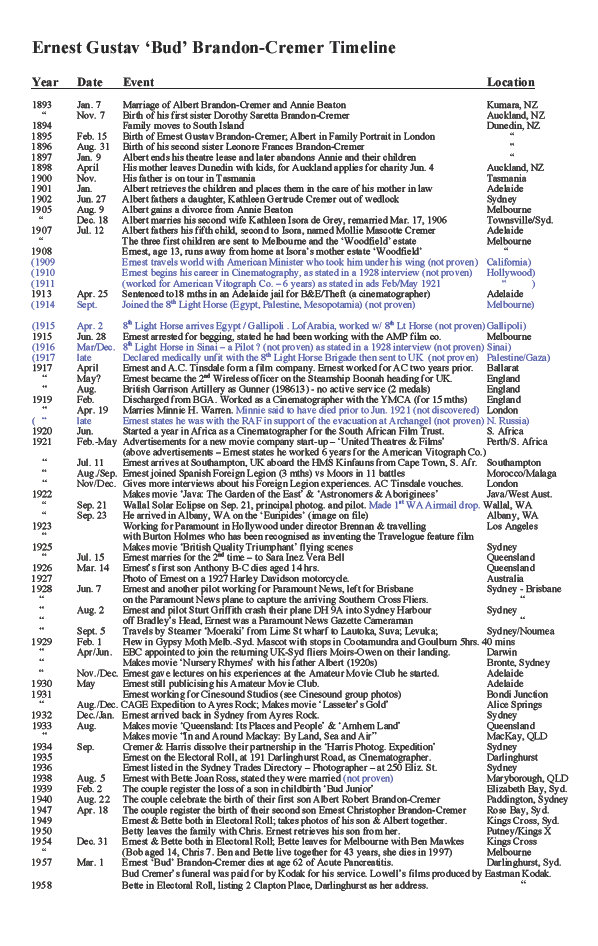
History timeline

== Incomplete filmography ==
- "Java: The Garden of the East" (1922) – Travelogue (film missing)
- "Astronomers and Aboriginees" (1922) – Western Australian Solar Eclipse Documentary
- "British Quality Triumphant" (1925) – Showcase of Automobiles & Aircraft
- "Nursery Rhymes" (1929) – Children's film with Albert Brandon-Cremer (Bronte Beach, Sydney)
- "Lasseter's Gold" (1931) – Documentary
- "Queensland: Its Places and People" (1933) – Travelogue
- "In and Around Mackay: By Land, Sea and Air" (1933) – Travelogue
- "Arnhem Land" (1933) – script produced, permission was not granted by Canberra to make this film.
