= Lasseter's Reef =

Purported gold deposit in central Australia

Lasseter's Reef refers to the purported discovery, announced by Harold Bell Lasseter in 1929 and 1930, of a fabulously rich gold deposit in a remote and desolate corner of central Australia. Lasseter's accounts of the find are conflicting and its precise location remains a mystery—if it exists.

== Timeline ==
In 1929 and again in 1930 Lewis Harold Bell Lasseter (1880–1931) made different (and possibly conflicting) claims that either in 1911 or in 1897, he had discovered a rich gold deposit. On 14 October 1929 he wrote a letter to Kalgoorlie federal member, Albert Green, claiming to have discovered "a vast gold bearing reef in Central Australia" 18 years earlier and that it was located at the western edge of the MacDonnell Ranges. He made a similar claim to other officials and was interviewed by a commissioner and a geologist, however the government took no action to investigate the claim. It was revealed that from 1908 to 1913 Lasseter lived on a lease-hold farm near Tabulam.

In March 1930, he provided a different story to John Bailey of the Australian Workers' Union. In this claim Lasseter details that as a young man of the age of 17, he rode on horse from Queensland to the West Australian gold fields, during which he stumbled across a huge gold reef somewhere near the border between the Northern Territory and Western Australia. However Lasseter had been sentenced to reform school at that time for armed robbery. According to the story told to Bailey, Lasseter was about 700 miles (1,100 km) west of Alice Springs in a line towards Kalgoorlie. He claimed that subsequent to this discovery he got into difficulties and was fortuitously rescued by a passing Afghan camel driver who took him to the camp of a surveyor, Joseph Harding. Harding and Lasseter were said to have later returned to the reef in the attempt to fix its location, but failed because their watches were inaccurate. As the expedition with Harding dated in the years before World War I, the two different versions about the finding of the reef could have been unconflicting; it is possible that Lasseter did refer sometimes to his first finding in 1897 and sometimes to the first expedition with Harding.

According to Lasseter, he spent the next three decades trying to raise sufficient interest to fund an expedition into the interior. But at the time the fortunes being made from the gold rush at Kalgoorlie in Western Australia meant that no-one was prepared to risk trekking into the uncharted desert wilderness of central Australia, even if the supposed discovery was as rich as he claimed.

== The 1930 expedition ==
By 1930, when Australia was in the grip of the Great Depression, the attractions of desert gold were much greater, and Lasseter succeeded in securing approximately £50,000 in private funding towards an expedition to relocate the reef. Unusual for the time, this expedition included motorised vehicular transport and an aircraft. Accompanying Lasseter were experienced bushmen Fred Blakeley (leader) and Frank Colson as well as George Sutherland (prospector), Phil Taylor (engineer, driver), John Blakeston-Houston (governor-general's aide, 'explorer') and Errol Coote (pilot).

On 21 July 1930 the group left Alice Springs but Lasseter was a sullen companion and a vague guide. They headed for Ilbilba (aka Ilbpilla Soak) – an aerodrome created earlier that year for Donald George Mackay's expedition, near Lake Mackay. The group endured logistical difficulties and physical hardships (including the loss of a plane). On reaching Mount Marjorie (now Mount Leisler), Lasseter declared that they were 240 kilometres (150 mi) too far north of the search zone. Exasperated, Blakeley declared Lasseter a charlatan, and decided to end the expedition. They parted with Lasseter at Ilbilba.

Lasseter insisted on continuing the trek, accompanied by a dingo-shooter, Paul Johns, and his team of camels. Lasseter, whose behaviour was increasingly erratic, set off towards Kata Tjuṯa. One afternoon Lasseter returned to camp with some concealed rock samples and announced that he had relocated the gold reef. He refused to reveal its location. Johns, who by now doubted Lasseter's sanity, accused him of being a liar. A fight ensued, and Johns left Lasseter to his own devices, returning to civilisation. Lasseter himself trudged off into the desert sands with two camels.

A search for Lasseter was conducted by the Eclipse Gold Expedition, which primarily sought to locate the reef, and his body was discovered by bushman, Bob Buck in March 1931. Buck found Lasseter's emaciated body in a shallow, oval shaped grave, in which the Pitjantjatjara had buried him. Buck reburied him. Walter Smith (bushman) was also on this expedition and claimed to have reburied the body again after Buck as the grave was still too shallow. The burial of Lasseter would continue to cause contention until it was finally relocated to the Alice Springs Memorial Cemetery.

Buck also located Lasseter's personal effects in a cave at Hull's Creek and, from Lasseter's diary, it was learned that after Johns had left, Lasseter's camels bolted, leaving him alone in the desert without any means of sustaining himself or returning. He encountered a group of nomadic Aboriginal people (the Pitjantjatjara), who helped him with food and shelter; despite their help a weakened and blinded Lasseter eventually died of malnutrition and exhaustion after several weeks, having made a belated attempt to walk from the cave to Uluru or Kata Tjuṯa.

Various statements by Paul Johns reveal the areas where he and Lasseter travelled and searched while together: the Petermann and Rawlinson Ranges, then south-west to the Warburton Range, then a zigzag course evidently following the ranges eastward to the Western Australian border ending at the Petadi rock hole at the eastern end of the Mann Range in South Australia. Almost out of supplies they then returned to Ilbilba where they parted.

Geologists have made various statements as to whether or not there are gold bearing areas in this country. In 1931 geologists T. Blatchford and H.W.B. Talbot accompanying Bob Buck pronounced the region as unpromising but they only inspected the Petermann Range and the eastern end of the Rawlinson Range, travelling no farther west than Sladen Waters. In 2014 geologists W.D. Maier, H.M. Howard and R.H. Smithies likened the southern part of Lasseter's search area to the Bushveld Complex in South Africa where gold deposits do occur and said the region has high potential, quoting a 2002 report of copper-gold vein style material found north of the Cavenagh Range.

== Later history ==
No maps showing the location of the fabled gold reef were ever found, and over subsequent decades the tale of the reef and its discoverer has assumed mythic proportions; it is perhaps the most famous lost mine legend in Australia, and remains a "holy grail" among Australian prospectors. Popular adventure-story author Ion Idriess, in his book Lasseter's Last Ride (1931), gives a detailed description of Lasseter's time with the Aboriginal peoples. His diary's notes were hidden from the Aboriginal peoples by being buried under camp fires. They had shunned Lasseter after their Kurdaitcha man "pointed the bone at him" – he was condemned to be ignored and no longer cared for. Another story is told in Pintupi-Luritja language and English in Laatjatanya Yanutja, available in the Living Archive of Aboriginal Languages.

In 1988, Senator John Panizza stated that he had "spent a bit of time searching for Lasseter's Reef" and believed that the Telfer mine was the most likely candidate for the lost reef.

== In popular culture ==
Lasseter's Reef became a famous Australian folk tale. It inspired a sub-plot in the film, Strike Me Lucky (1934), and Lasseter's fate was recreated in the movie Phantom Gold (1936). In 1974, Bill Gill Productions and Australian Film School worked on a film version of Lasseter's Last Ride.

Two songs are titled "Lasseter's Last Ride"; the first by Peter Dawson and Edward Harrington and performed by Peter Dawson (May 1940), and the second by Dean Thomas (September 2012). Other songs dealing with the subject include: "Lasseter" (James Hermel), "Lasseter" (William Lovelock), "Lasseter's Dream" (Keith Glass), "Lasseter's Gold" (M Vijars, T Davis), and "Lasseters Reef of Gold" (Brian Letton).

Luke Walker's 2013 documentary feature Lasseter's Bones explores the life and legend of Lasseter and documents the filmmaker's many attempts to locate the notorious Lasseter's Reef. The film also follows Lasseter's elderly son Bob on his last desert expedition to find his father's lost gold and explores the many complex strands of the Lasseter mystery. Lasseter's Bones was nominated for Best Documentary at the Film Critics Circle of Australia Awards.

In January 2017, an episode of Expedition Unknown on the American Travel Channel, titled "Lasseter's Gold", examined the mystery.
