= Bob Buck (bushman) =

Australian pastoralist (1881–1960)

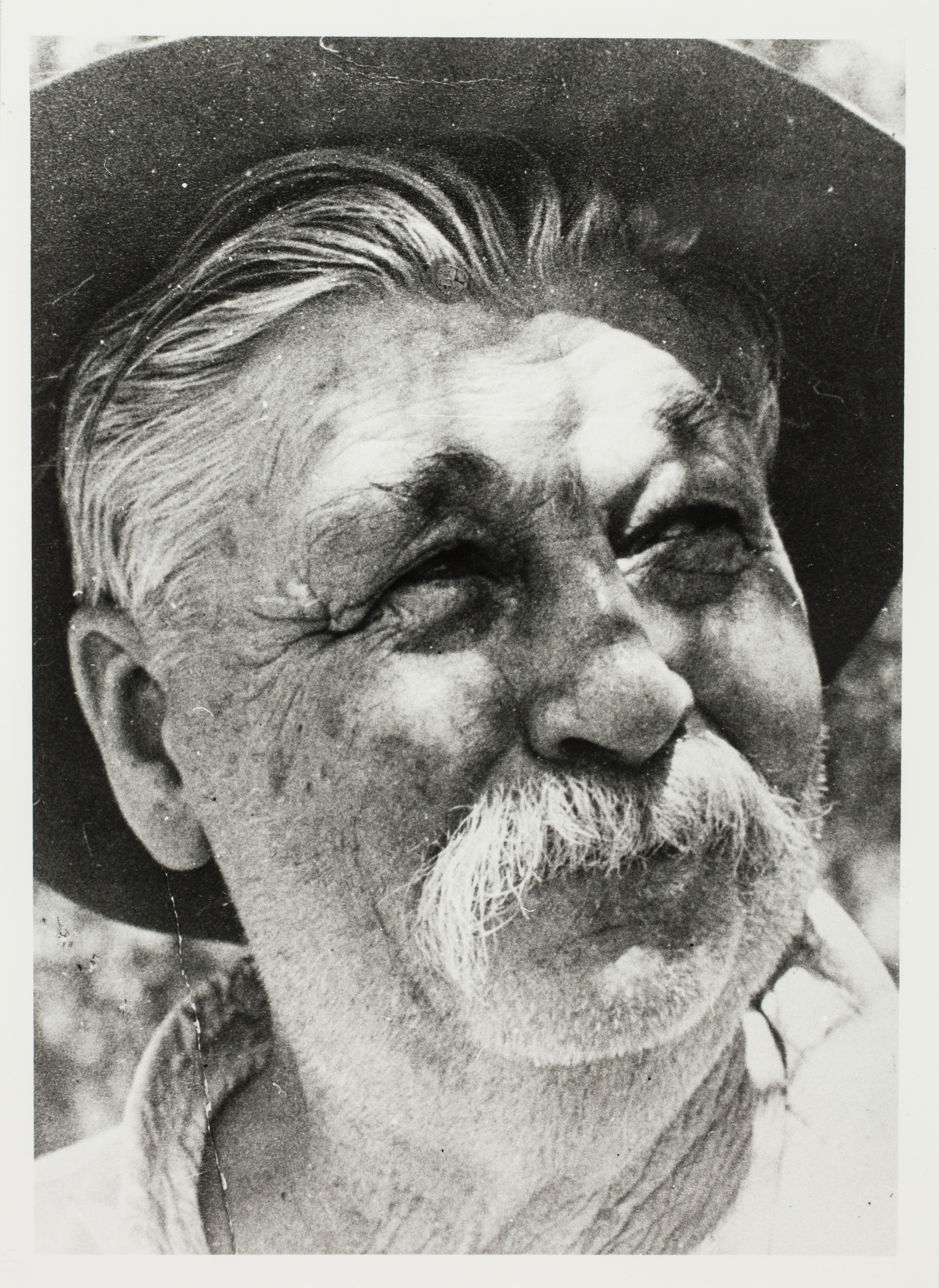
Bob Buck with a walrus moustache, circa 1950.

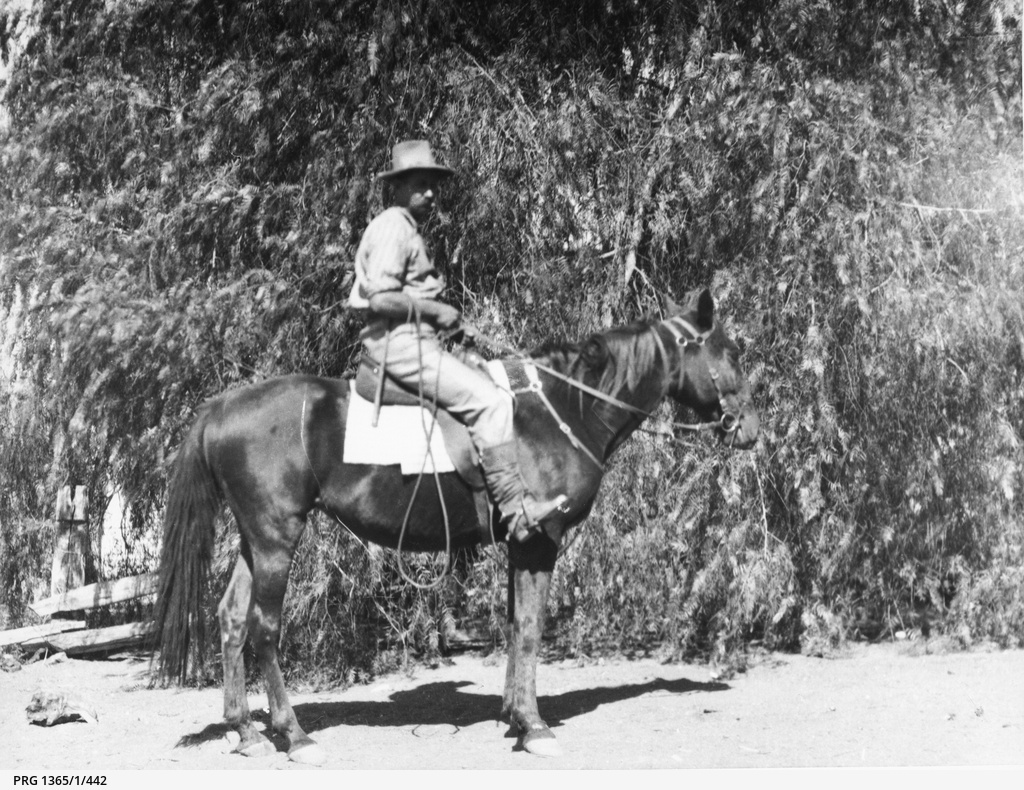
Bob Buck on his horse in 1924

Robert Henry Buck (2 July 1881 - 9 August 1960) was an Australian pastoralist, bushman and drover who is best remembered as being one of the people to recover the body of Lewis Harold Bell Lasseter.

== Early life ==
Buck was born on 2 July 1881 in Alberton in South Australia and he is the son of Robert and Sarah Ann Buck. Buck was primarily self-educated and, until 1905, worked in and around Wallaroo until he joined his uncle Joseph Breaden to work in the Northern Territory.

== Life in the Northern Territory ==
Buck's uncle owned Todmorden, Henbury and Idracowra stations in the Northern Territory and his brother Allan, also Buck's uncle, managed Idracowra Station. Working between these stations Buck learned bushmanship and worked as a stockman and saddler.

In 1907 Buck overlanded 800 head of cattle from Brunette Downs Station to Henbury Station, a journey which due to severe drought took 10 months, where he became the manager. Around this period Buck partnered with Molly Tjalameinta, an Arrernte woman, and they had a daughter Ettie. Buck was well respected and fondly regarded by the Aboriginal people living nearby Henbury Station and it is said he treated them well and was generous with rations compared to his contemporaries.

During this period Buck frequently made lengthy visits to Hermannsburg, which was a Lutheran Mission being run by Carl Strehlow, as his daughter Ettie was living, alongside Elsie Butler, there with missionaries Emil and Clara Munchenburg so that they could receive private tuition. Both girls were childhood friends of Ted Strehlow and Buck gifted Strehlow with a donkey called "possum" that would soon become a favourite pet.

Buck always made his visits to Hermannsburg with Molly and many expected that the often puritanical Carl Strehlow would not approve of the pair as they were not legally married, however, he always welcomed them. Strehlow approved that Buck was faithful to Molly and looked after Ettie "like any other family man".

In 1927 Buck left Henbury, and his uncles, and, in partnership with his long-term friend Alf Butler (father of Elsie), leased Middleton Ponds Station which there two would manage together until 1939. During this period Buck was also contracted to assist explorer Donald Mackay complete aerial surveys of the Northern Territory and Western Australia by assisting on the ground and working with a team of Aboriginal men and camels; Buck and his team cleared aerodromes, left supplies, guided aeroplanes with smoke-signals and many other tasks.

In February 1931 Buck, alongside Johnson Breaden, Lion, Billy Button, Ernest Gustav Brandon-Cremer a paid photographer who documented the expedition as well as several other men, were commissioned to search for Lewis Harold Bell Lasseter and they found and buried his body. They completed their 1000 miles journey on camel. There was suspicion at the time that Buck had not actually found the body and this brought Buck to national attention and was even travelled to Sydney to be interviewed by the media.

== Later life ==
In 1939 the Buck and Butler dissolved their partnership and Buck began managing Renner's Rock Station until he retired to Alice Springs in 1953. In Alice Springs Buck became an 'identity' at the Stuart Arms Hotel and he became a notorious yarn-spinner who told many tall stories.

Buck died on 9 August 1960 and is buried at the Memorial Cemetery in Alice Springs.

== Legacy ==
Buck Road in Ilparpa in Alice Springs and Lake Buck in the Tanami Desert are named for him.

Buck also donated a photograph collection to the Northern Territory Archives Service (now: Library & Archives NT) containing photographic negatives (NTRS 4432) and prints (NTRS 1248) of the Hermannsburg and Finke regions.
