= Albert Brandon-Cremer =

Actor and theatre company manager (b. 1871, d. 1959)

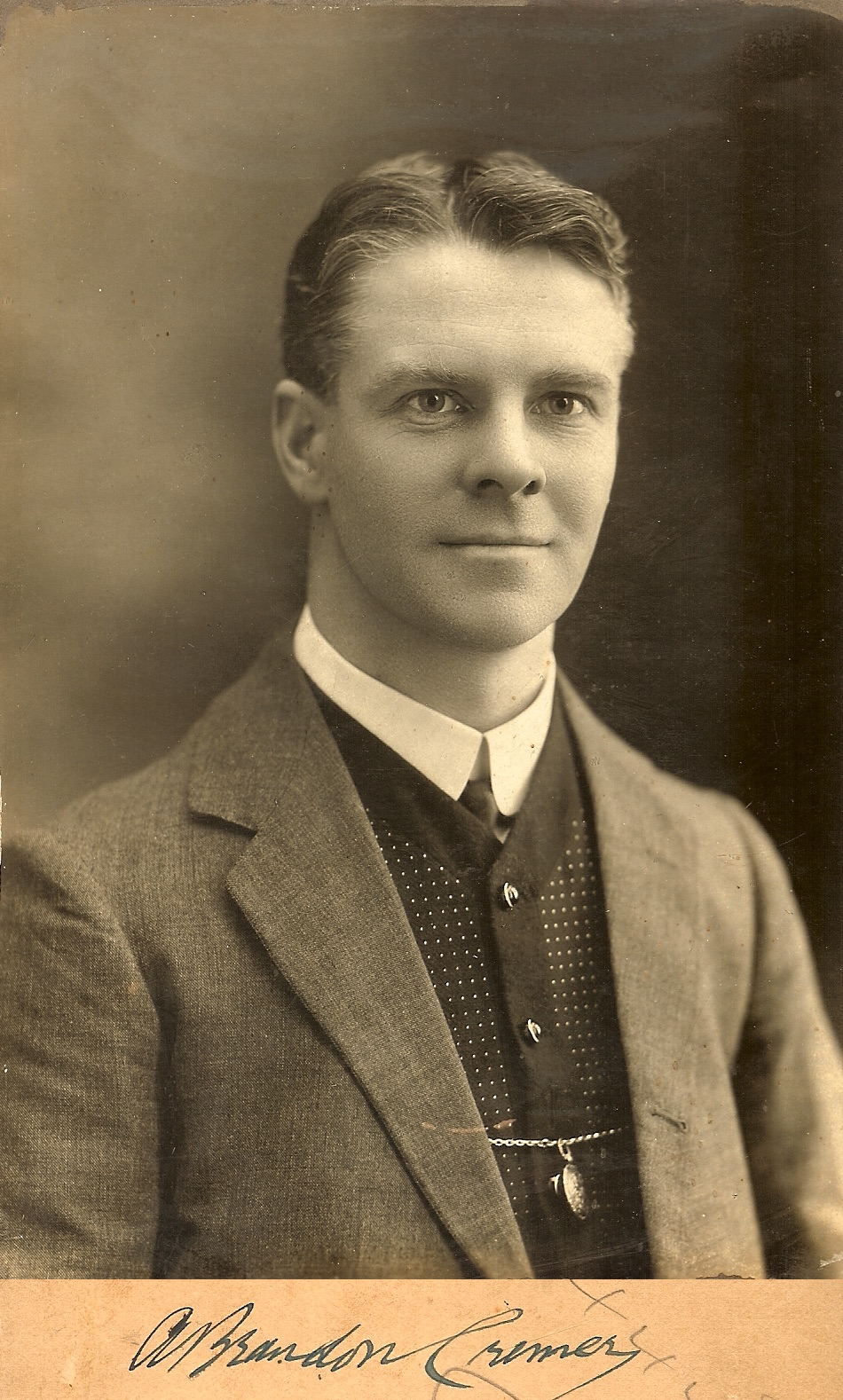
Portrait of AWA Brandon-Cremer, 1900

Albert Wilhelm Anton Brandon-Cremer (1871–1959), generally referred to as A. Brandon-Cremer or simply by his surname, was a key player in the history of the New Zealand and Australian theatre industry from 1896 to the mid-1950s. From his start as an actor in Auckland to his heyday in the early 1900s as a company manager and owner, he toured virtually every town in Australasia with the Brandon-Cremer Players. Brandon-Cremer has the distinction of a record 54 weeks of non-stop stage production in 1916–17. He also produced at least two early silent films. His directorial debut, in 1927, was the first travelogue shot in Tasmania. His daughter, Gertrude Brandon-Cremer, was a child star of the stage during the first 20 years of the 20th century and his son, Ernest Gustav Brandon-Cremer, was a well-known adventurer and documentary film maker. The family name generated thousands of newspaper articles over the course of Albert's life.

In Adelaide, 1952, Brandon-Cremer was once introduced in an interview by ABC Radio with "its really, um… rather difficult to think of any theatre movement in Australia, in the total history of the Australian theatre, without thinking of you".

== Early life ==
Brandon-Cremer was born on 7 November 1871 in Newry, County Down, Ireland, to parents Gustav Caesar Antonin Cremer and Saretta Frances Brandon. Albert was the fifth child in a family of eight brothers and one sister. The model Victorian Brandon-Cremer parents instilled a tradition of music and literature in their children, many of whom would go on to perform on stage.

At age 15, Albert was indentured to the New Zealand Shipping Company and made several trips from the UK to New Zealand and sailed around the world during the following years.

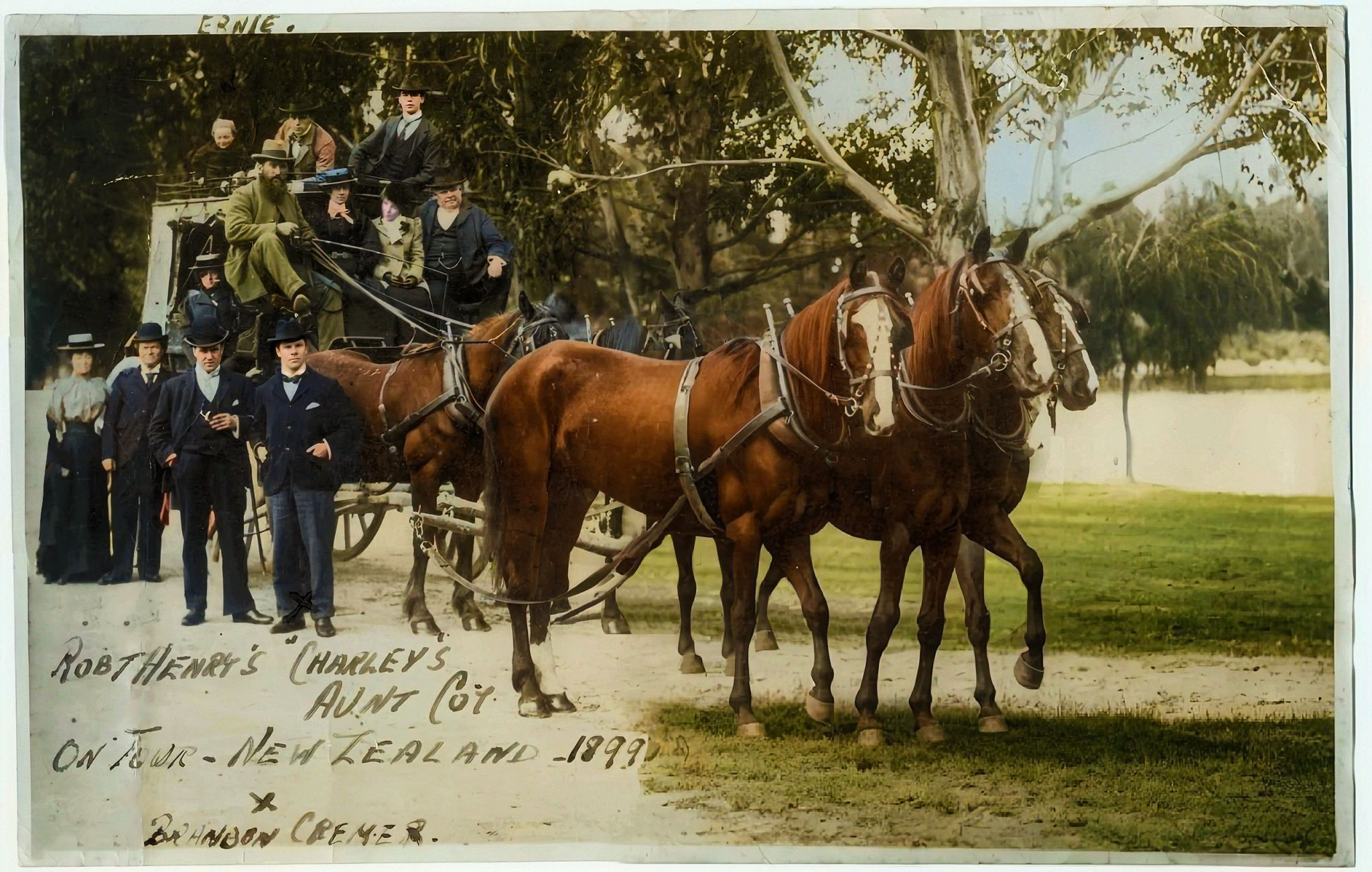
Robert Henry Theatrical Company, 1899 New Zealand. Front Row right to left – Albert Brandon-Cremer & Robert Henry with W. J. Coulter sitting on the right side of the carriage driver seat

== New Zealand ==
At the age of 19, Albert departed England for a new life in New Zealand aboard the SS Rangatiki on 22 August 1891, arriving in Wellington, New Zealand, on 22 December 1891. By early 1892, he was working as a farmhand at the Frimley Sheep Station, outside Wellington. His acting career began shortly after, while working with the Vivian Theatrical Co., then the Duncan Theatrical Co., before joining the Cowan & Amy Vaughan Amazon Co.—all in quick succession. The first mention of Albert working in New Zealand was for the Amy Vaughn Company in July 1892.

On 7 January 1893, while touring New Zealand, in the small booming gold mining town of Kumara on New Zealand's South Island, Albert married Annie Beaton, stage name Annie Wyniard, an opera singer. The couple registered the births of three children - Dorothy Saretta, born 1893; Ernest Gustav, 1895; and Leonore Frances, 1896. During this time Albert was managing the Frances Ross Dramatic Company.

In August 1897 Albert left for London to find work. London news clippings from February to June 1898 show that Albert was on stage in London. Albert returned to New Zealand in September 1898; in the same year he began touring there with the Robert Henry Theatrical Company.

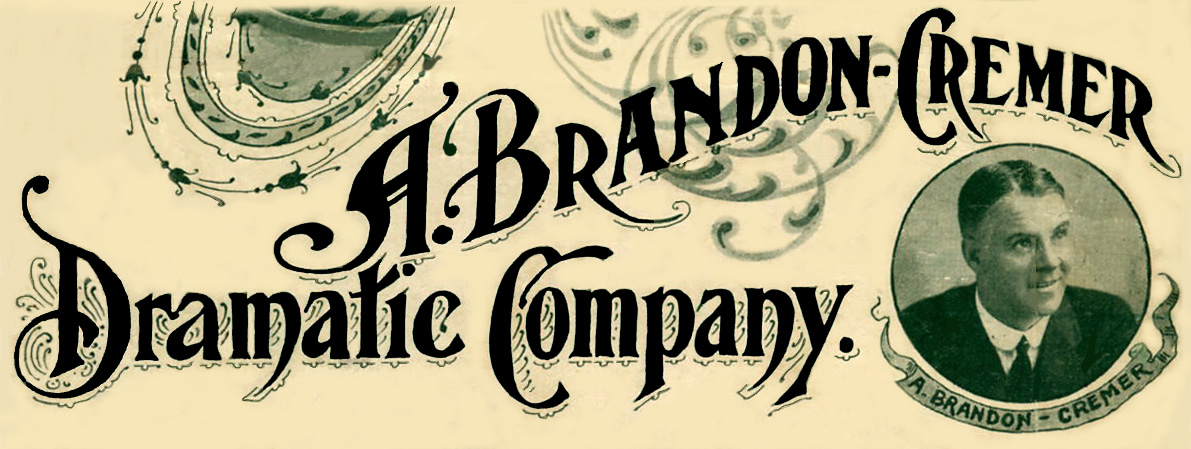
Logo representing the A Brandon-Cremer theatrical company, 1910

== The Brandon-Cremer Players Touring Company ==
In 1900 the family moved to Australia, with Albert travelling back and forth to New Zealand during that year for work. By this time Albert had already met Isora ‘Dolly’ Grey (an actress, stage name - Kathleen ‘Nora’ Arnold), a member of his new acting troupe, the ‘A. Brandon-Cremer Dramatic Company’. Albert's Company toured Australia for years to come and visited towns across both Australia and New Zealand.

Albert and Isora would marry and produce two children who would both go on to successful careers on stage and early television in Australia. The first: Kathleen Gertrude 'Gertie' Dora Barbara Cremer in 1902. The second: Mollie Stella Sadie Mascot Cremer in 1907.

Over the next 20 years Albert and Isora would have great success leasing theatres and running a repertory company across Australia and New Zealand. His work intertwined with such greats as J. C. Williamson as Isora, Albert's wife described in an interview covering this period. One of Albert's greatest successes was a 54-week production run in 1916–17 while leasing the Kings Theatre (now Mercury Theatre, Auckland), New Zealand, a record at the time.

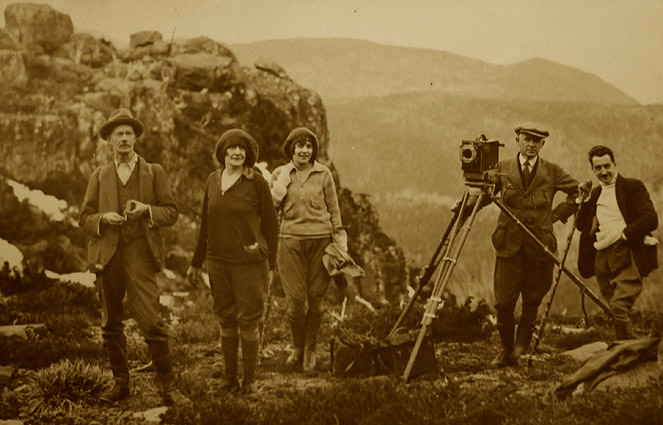
Bert Cross behind the camera at the shooting of 'Tasmania at Work and Play', image taken by son of the movie producer, AWA Brandon-Cremer

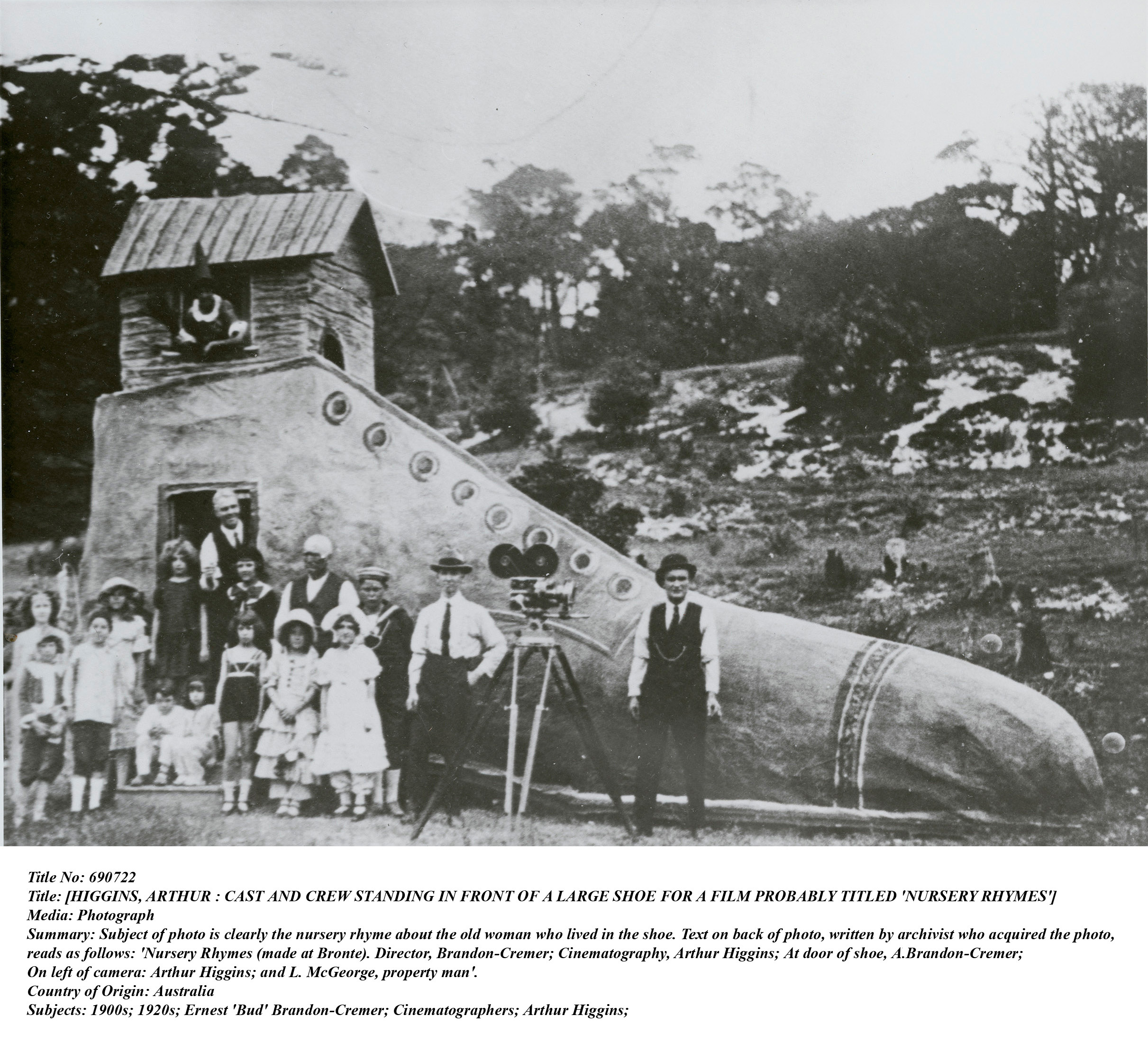
Cast and Crew of the missing film produced by AWA Brandon-Cremer, 1920

== Tasmania at Work and Play ==
By 1927, Albert was in Hobart, Tasmania, making a silent film entitled, ‘Tasmania at Work and Play’, starring his daughter Mollie as the central character. The short silent travelogue features scenes with Mollie as a tourist playing ‘Mollie from the Mainland’. The film has survived and is retained by Tasmanian State archives. The film was credited as the first such movie shot in Tasmania. The cinematographer was Bert Cross from Sydney who worked at Cinesound with Albert's son, Ernest. In 1929, Albert made another short silent film entitled, ‘Nursery Rhymes’, shot by his son Ernest on Bronte Beach, which was shown across Australia. This movie has been lost. Cinematographer Arthur Higgins was also attached.

That same year, Albert's first wife, Annie Cremer (née Beaton), died, age 61, of kidney and liver failure, an illness she suffered with for many years. Annie was buried in an unmarked common grave at the Melbourne General Cemetery, central Melbourne.

== A Return to the UK ==
By 1931, Albert had returned to London once again to find work in the Theatre. Albert was mentioned several times in the book 'The London Stage 1930-1939'. One entry notes stage-managing the play, 'Bed Rock' at the Apollo Theatre, Shaftsbury Avenue, London, in early 1931, the play survived only 12 performances. Some of the many other plays he was involved with were: 'The Fatal Wedding', 'Old Bill' with Sir Seymour Hicks, 'Sweet Nell of Old Drury' and 'Tons of Money' with Nellie Stewart. Also a run with a play entitled 'The Man They Could Not Hang'. While in the UK, Isora, Gertrude and Mollie would join him and start new lives in London.

== The End of an Era ==
In late 1949, Albert, travelling alone, returned to Australia from his 19-year stay in London. In his final years, Albert continued to act in such plays as ‘Charlie’s Aunt’, 'A Worm's Eye View', 'One Wild Oat', and 'Seagulls Over Sorrento' with the Australian actor Gordon Chater. His work was also mentioned in a series of notices in the Brisbane Courier Mail between 3 and 25 January 1952. Albert was credited as working with Australian actor Bill Hodge in 'A Worms Eye View' in 1955, this was one of Albert's last known plays. Albert was mentioned in several books covering the histories of the Australian/British Stage. One book entitled 'When Vaudeville Was King', as well in the book, 'Family of Brothers'. Another mention in 'The London Stage 1890-1959' and in 'Her Majesty's Pleasure'

Albert W. A. Brandon-Cremer died on 11 July 1959. His wife, Isora, had died the year before. Albert and Isora were laid to rest in the Fawkner Crematorium and Memorial Park, Hadfield, Victoria (North Melbourne), with no markers.
