= Lasseter's Last Ride =

Book by Ion Idriess

- First edition
- Author: Ion Idriess
- Cover artist: Edgar A. Holloway
- Language: English
- Publisher: Angus and Robertson
- Publication date: 1931
- Publication place: Australia

Lasseter's Last Ride is an Australian book by Ion Idriess.

It was his first best seller, selling more than 90,000 copies in Australia.

There were five different editions of it. It tells the story of Harold Bell Lasseter and Lasseter's Reef.
