= The Assembly (Canadian TV series) =

2025 Canadian TV series

The Assembly is a Canadian television documentary interview series that premiered in 2025 on CBC Television.

Produced by Small Army Entertainment and based on the French television series Les Rencontres du Papotin, the series features a panel of interviewers on the autism spectrum interviewing celebrity guests.

== Interview guests ==
Interview guests in the six-episode first season were Howie Mandel, Maitreyi Ramakrishnan, Jann Arden, Allan Hawco, Arlene Dickinson and Russell Peters. Revelations broadcast in the series included Arden discussing her battle with alcoholism, Mandel talking about how his life was improved when he publicly opened up about his obsessive-compulsive disorder, Dickinson sharing that despite her success on television and in business she is still an introverted person who struggles with insecurity, and Peters talking about the difficult relationship he had with his mother growing up. Dickinson later stated that "it was the most moving experience I've had in terms of really being able to connect with people in a different way. There are no barriers or guardrails in place in terms of what they asked, but also the questions truly came from a place of deep interest."

== Production ==
The series premiered November 6, 2025. In April 2026, the CBC announced that it had renewed the series for a second season.

== Reception ==
The series received two Canadian Screen Award nominations at the 14th Canadian Screen Awards in 2026, for Best Factual Series (Sean De Vries, Stephen Sawchuk) and winner of Best Direction in a Factual Series (Heather Hawthorn Doyle for the episode featuring Howie Mandel). The show was also the winner of the Kathleen Shannon Award at the 2026 Yorkton Film Festival Golden Sheaf Awards in Yorkton, Saskatchewan on May 23, 2026.
