= HotDocs =

Mitratech HotDocs
- Type: Private
- Industry: Computer Software
- Products: HotDocs Legal Document Automation

HotDocs is a document automation (also known as document generation or document assembly) software company currently owned by Mitratech. Version 1.0 of HotDocs was introduced in 1993.

== Description ==
Mitratech HotDocs transforms documents and graphical (PDF) forms into document-generation templates and deploys of these templates to various server environments.

Document modeling in Mitratech HotDocs can range from variable insertions to the formation and insertions of complex, computed variables. Business logic consisting of IF/THEN statements and REPEAT loops can be built into the template to control the inclusion or exclusion of language blocks. HotDocs includes a variety of other scripting instructions and sets of pre-packaged functions using boolean logic. HotDocs also enables system architects to create custom functions.

In use, a HotDocs template queries the user for the information necessary to generate a document (or set of documents) and saves the information in an answer file. The application then uses the saved information to assemble a custom version of the document, inserting and formatting variable information, inserting the right clauses based on transactional conditions, and inserting correct pronouns and verbs.

The Mitratech HotDocs technology stack includes a logic core, a set of development tools, platforms for deploying intelligent templates in any environment, and a wide range of user-layer technologies (web applications for consuming HotDocs templates).

=== Logic Core ===
At the base of the Mitratech HotDocs stack is a logic core, which consists of 1 million+ lines of code. The logic core enables HotDocs to handle the modeling complexities of documents and forms of any complexity and any length.

=== Mitratech HotDocs Developer ===
Mitratech HotDocs Developer is a document-generation-process-modelling environment that allows a system architect to build business logic into a document. HotDocs Developer, likewise, allows a system architect to design interviews (sequences of interactive data-gathering forms) that gather all the information necessary to generate the underlying document or documents. In combination, a modelled document and its accompanying interview are the two parts of a document automation template.

HotDocs Developer works within commercially available word processors such as Microsoft Word. This approach is useful for organizations that want to retain all the formatting attributes currently used in their word processing documents, including font faces, columns, pagination elements, etc.

HotDocs includes a development environment for the automation of PDF-based graphical forms (fields, checkboxes, etc.). HotDocs allows for shared components among any number of documents, meaning all the Word documents, WordPerfect documents, and PDF-based forms in a set can be generated from a single answer file.

=== Mitratech HotDocs Platforms ===
The HotDocs stack includes platforms for desktop, client/server (on-premises), and cloud deployment of HotDocs document-generation templates. Multiple third-party developers build their own technologies on the HotDocs desktop API. HotDocs Server is designed for on-premises, server-based document generation. HotDocs Cloud Services is a multi-tenant, cloud version of HotDocs Server designed for enterprises that want to forego the upfront cost and upkeep of HotDocs Server.

=== Mitratech HotDocs User-Layer Technologies ===
HotDocs provides multiple off-the-shelf applications for using HotDocs templates, including a standard desktop application and several browser applications.

== History ==
What is now known as HotDocs Corporation began as a research project in the mid-1970s at Brigham Young University Law School. Funded at the time by West Publishing, the project began as a code base, developed for the VAX mainframe computer running the VMS operating system. In the late 1980s, the project became commercial with the founding of Capsoft Development by Marshall Morrise. Capsoft Development licensed the technology from BYU and ported the code base into DOS. A few years later, the technology was re-birthed as HotDocs, a Windows-based version that reflected many of the original feature sets from the old VAX version.

Version 1 of HotDocs was released in 1993. Graphical forms functionality was added in 1996. In 1998, HotDocs Corporation was purchased by Matthew Bender. HotDocs Corporation became the property of LexisNexis in 1999 when LexisNexis bought Matthew Bender. In 2009, Capsoft UK, the largest independent reseller of HotDocs software, bought the HotDocs business from LexisNexis.

In October 2011, HotDocs announced that its software would be deployed to 15,000 members of the U.S. Department of Justice. The company also entered into a partnership with Thomson Reuters to provide the technology platform for Interactive Decision Tools on Checkpoint, a research and analysis tool for tax lawyers and accountancy firms.

In January 2012, HotDocs released HotDocs Document Services, a software-as-a-service (SaaS) application designed to bring browser-based document generation to small and midsize law firms. More recently, HotDocs launched HotDocs Author 1.0, a bundled service aimed at large enterprise businesses. The company continues to offer HotDocs Developer and HotDocs User, which are marketed to smaller businesses.

In 2017, HotDocs was acquired by AbacusNext.

In 2024, HotDocs was acquired by Mitratech.

== Products ==
- HotDocs Developer—used to transform documents and forms into templates.
- HotDocs User—a desktop application for organizing and accessing templates built with HotDocs Developer.
- HotDocs Server—designed for server-based deployment of HotDocs templates.
- HotDocs Cloud Services—launched in January 2012, a cloud-based SaaS (Software-as-a-Service) product which allows law firms and other entities already using HotDocs to transition from the desktop to the internet for document production.

== See also ==
- Document Automation
- Cloud computing
