= Ken Dyers =

Australian founder of Kenja

Ken Dyers (14 July 1922 – 25 July 2007) was one of two founders of Kenja Communication. He served with the Australian Army during World War II. He founded Kenja with his partner, Jan Hamilton, in 1982. In 1993 he was charged with sexual offences against four young girls, but was found not guilty on ten of the 11 counts, with the remaining conviction overturned in 2002. He was again charged with child sexual assault in 2005. The court case received a temporary stay on the grounds of ill health, but Dyers committed suicide before the case could return to court.

== Early life ==
Dyers was born on 14 July 1922. His father was 54 when he was born. Dyers claimed that his father, Charlie Dyers, was a toddler on Daly Waters station in the Northern Territory where he had become lost in 1872, at the age of three. He further claimed that Charlie was picked up by a drover three years later at the age of six and returned to Daly Waters station, and that he had lived with an Aboriginal tribe in the intervening years. However, there is no record of that event. Daly Waters was named by John McDouall Stuart in his third attempt to cross the continent from south to north in 1862. A pastoral map of the area from 1887 shows that there were no pastoral stations operating in the area of Daly Waters at that time, and the Overland Telegraph station there was not established until in 1872.

== War record ==
During World War II, Dyers served in the Australian Army as a military policeman with 9th Division Provost Company from his arrival in the Middle East on 25 September 1941 until he embarked for Sydney on 27 January 1943, and again from 30 July 1943 until his return to Sydney on 23 March 1944. His record details a chequered career, and a large amount of time in field hospitals and casualty clearing stations. Dyers served in the 32 Works Company in Australia until he was discharged. He was court-martialled three times. In late 1943, he was in jail for five days awaiting trial on three charges, and eventually convicted of "conduct prejudicial to the good order and military discipline". In June 1944, he went absent without leave for 16 days. In April 1945, he was fined for leaving his sentry post, and was fined again in July for misconduct. The record also contains an assessment of his "mental instability" which is rated at 10 per cent on the day he was demobilized in August 1946.

In his article examining the inconsistencies between Dyers' claims and verifiable records, Sydney Morning Herald journalist, Robert Wainright, referred to Dyers' wartime biography as exposing a 'Walter Mitty Complex'.

== Scientology ==
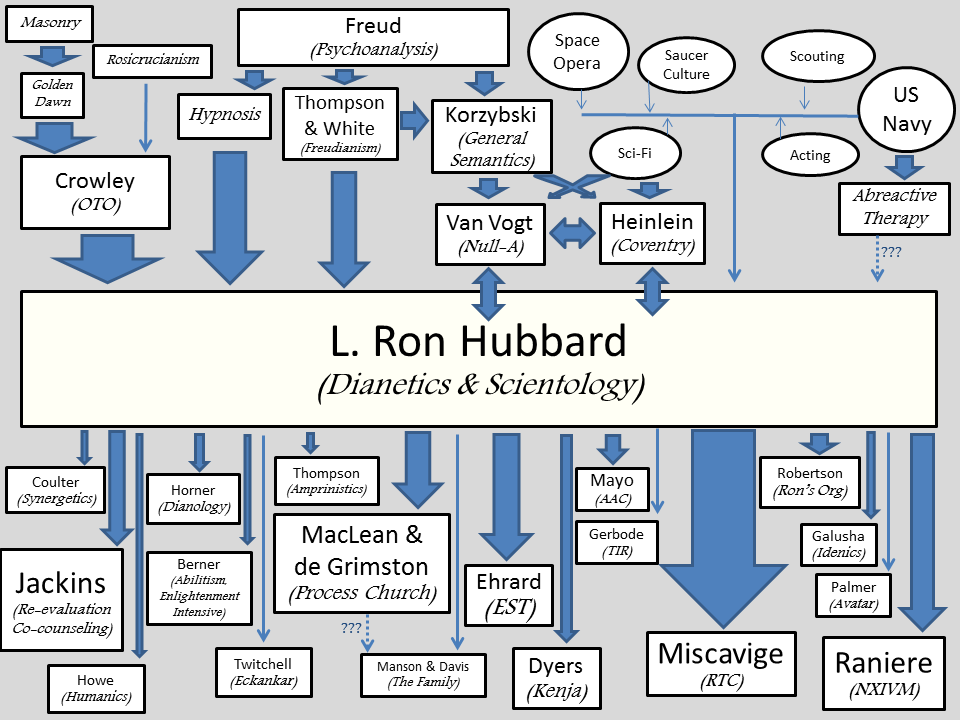
Hubbard's beliefs and practices, drawn from a diverse set of sources, influenced numerous offshoots, splinter groups, and new movements

Dyers joined the Church of Scientology but later left it. In a list published from the 1950s onwards by the organisation, Dyers is listed as a suppressive person. Kenja used some Scientology techniques including training routine TR6, "Walk over to that wall".

== Child sexual assault ==
In 1993, Dyers was charged with 11 counts of sexual offences against four girls between the ages of 8 and 15, three of whom were sisters. After several trials and appeals, which lasted almost a decade, Dyers was found not guilty of 10 of the charges. He was found guilty of one charge (tried separately) and jailed at Long Bay Correctional Centre for six days before being released on bail. An appeal in 2000 failed and, in 2002, the charge was overturned in the High Court of Australia on the grounds that the trial judge had potentially misdirected the jury. A new trial was ordered but the DPP did not seek a retrial because it determined that Dyers had served his sentence.

On 28 October 2005, Dyers was charged in Sutherland Local Court with the sexual assault of two 12-year-old girls, alleged to have taken place at Kenja's Surry Hills headquarters in 2001–2002. Dyers was released on bail under the condition that he attend Sutherland Police Station weekly and not attend Kenja premises or events. Dyers applied for a "permanent stay" of the court case on the grounds of ill health. He also applied for and received a variance to his bail conditions to travel to a Kenja function in Melbourne. His application for a permanent stay was rejected, as was a further application to attend a Kenja function in Sydney. He was given a temporary stay for one year on the grounds of mental health.

Dyers denied he was guilty of the charges against him, claiming that they were the result of former members trying to destroy him as part of a witch-hunt. His lawyer offered the defence that 13-year-old girls "know how to say no, they get educated in school" and that "there will be contrary medical evidence indicating that Mr Dyers has had erectile dysfunction for almost 15 years".

Dyers was contacted by his solicitor on 25 July and informed the NSW Police would interview him again regarding fresh allegations from another young girl. Dyers committed suicide by gunshot to the head on 25 July 2007.

Twenty-two charges of sexual assault and aggravated sexual assault had been committed to trial by Magistrate Jaqueline Trad at the time of Dyers' suicide, and he had received a one-year reprieve from attending court on the grounds of mental health. His solicitor had informed him of further charges from a third girl on the day before his suicide.
