= George Robertson (publisher) =

English-born Australian bookseller and publisher (1860-1933)

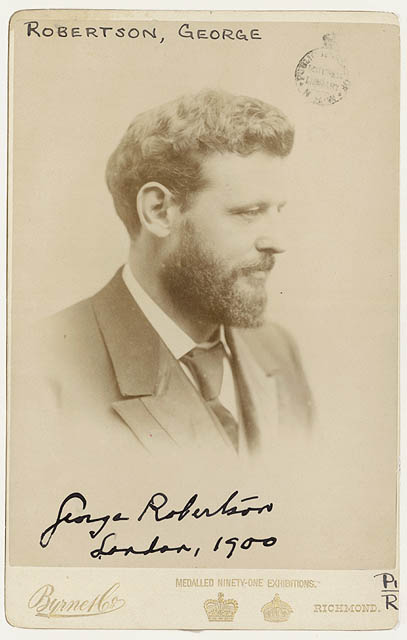
George Robertson in London, 1900

George Robertson (14 April 1860 – 27 August 1933) was an English-born Scottish/Australian bookseller and publisher, who alongside partner and fellow Scotsman David Angus co-founded Angus & Robertson.

== Biography ==
Robertson, the son of the Rev. John Robertson, was born at Halstead, Essex, England.

As a bookseller Robertson was always interested in buying "books and other rare items relating to Australia and adjacent regions". He encouraged the wealthy Sydney book collector David Scott Mitchell to collect early Australian books and manuscripts. Mitchell's formation of his unmatched collection, which he later bequeathed to the state of New South Wales, was "largely indebted to the efforts of booksellers who knew Australiana, including George Robertson, Fred W. Wymark, William Dymock and James R. Tyrrell".

In 1929 he founded the Halstead Press, which for 40 years would be "Australia's leading book printer".

In recognition to Robertson's contribution to publishing, the Australian Publishers Association has established the George Robertson Award, for individuals who have 30+ years' service to publishing and its success.

He was married twice, first to Elizabeth Stewart Bruce in 1881, and, in 1910, to Eva Adeline Ducat. He died at the age of 73 and was survived by his second wife and his children from his first marriage.

== See also ==
- Angus & Robertson
