= James Robert Tyrrell =

Australian bookseller, art dealer, publisher and author

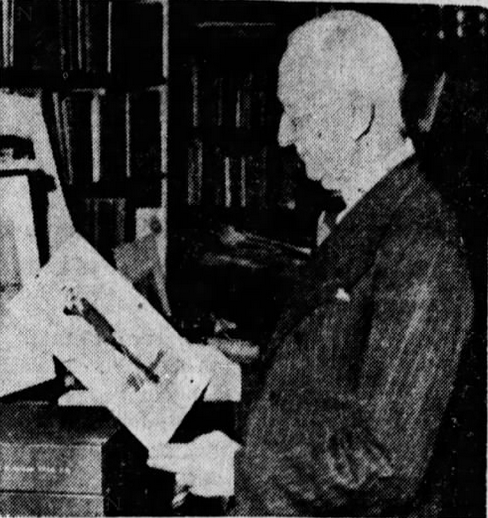
- James Robert Tyrrell
- Born: 3 July 1875; Darlington, New South Wales, Australia
- Died: 30 July 1961 (aged 86); Sydney, New South Wales, Australia
- Occupations: Bookseller, art dealer, publisher
- Known for: Founder of Tyrrell's Bookshop and author of Old Books, Old Friends, Old Sydney

James Robert Tyrrell (3 July 1875 – 30 July 1961) was an Australian bookseller, art dealer, publisher and author. He enjoyed a career of seven decades in the booktrade and was esteemed in his era as the "doyen of Sydney booksellers". He wrote a standard history of early bookselling in Australia entitled Old Books, Old Friends, Old Sydney.

== Early life and career ==
Tyrrell was born on 3 July 1875 in Darlington, New South Wales, an inner city suburb of Sydney. His father, George, was born in England and, after serving in the Crimean War, migrated to New South Wales to try his luck on the goldfields. His mother, Mary, née Colgan, was born in Ireland and migrated to Queensland.

He attended school in Balmain and Petersham, and earned pocket money by selling newspapers at Petersham station for the N.S.W. Bookstall Company. At the age of 15, he began to work for the Sydney bookselling firm, Angus and Robertson. His duties in those days included running errands, delivering books and keeping an eye on the books displayed outside the shop. He was working 64 hours a week for which received 7/6 [7 shillings and 6 pence]. George Robertson, one of the proprietors of Angus and Robertson, encouraged Tyrrell to learn and suggested a reading programme for him. As Tyrrell gained experience and knowledge of books and bookselling, he set up a small shop (with Robertson's encouragement) which sold books at night near Sydney University. Robertson also permitted him to build his personal library by choosing from Angus and Robertson's discards.

When Angus and Robertson moved to Castlereagh Street, Tyrrell was able to meet and converse with the many writers, artists and collectors who gathered there.

In 1897-98 Tyrrell, who was by then an Australiana expert, became Angus and Robertson's chief buyer in London and Edinburgh.

== Tyrrell's Bookshop ==
In 1907 Tyrrell, "with a capital of two hundred pounds saved over 17 years" started his own bookselling business known as Tyrrell's Bookshop at the corner of Castlereagh and Market Streets. in 1910 he moved to Adelaide, South Australia, where he started a business known as Tyrrell's Ltd., located at 128 Gawler Place and that dealt in both books and in art. While in Adelaide, he became friends with poet C. J. Dennis and others associated with The Gadfly literary journal.

In 1914 he returned to Sydney and opened a new business at 22 Castlereagh Street, again dealing in both books and art. While at his address he commenced a third business activity—publishing—which saw a growing catalogue of publications, including works by the Australian writer and bush poet Henry Lawson, Australian poet, novelist and journalist Zora Cross and the cartoonist David Low. One of the books published by Tyrrell in 1914 was Sydney Ure Smith's Relics of Old Colonial Days: A Book of Drawings (a limited edition of 500 copies, which are now sought after items). He also published the Peeps at the Past book series.

Tyrrell was fascinated in collectable items. He purchased the "established Hunter Street business, Antiques Ltd." and in 1924 bought out Tost and Rohu, an old-established firm dealing in "furs, curios, opals, and South Sea Island mementoes".

Growing business compelled him to move his business first "next door to A. & R.'s and then in 1935 to 281 George Street (near Wynyard Station), where he remained for many years".

In 1955 he moved his business to 202 George Street, not far from Circular Quay.

== Legacy ==
In his book Old Books, Old Friends, Old Sydney (1952) and its sequel Postscript: Further Bookselling Reminiscences (1957), Tyrrell has left us a record of a "formative period in Australian cultural history", principally the years 1888-1905.

In a series of observations, mainly in anecdotal form, these books provide portraits of the "bookfellows" that he knew: booksellers such as Robertson, Dymock and Wymark; writers such as Lawson, Paterson, Archibald, C. J. Dennis, Brennan and Brereton; artists and illustrators such as the Lindsays and Low; book collectors such as Mitchell and Dixon; public figures such as Parkes and Hughes; and international visitors to Sydney such as Twain and Stevenson.

Tyrrell was an avid bibliophile and a keen student and collector of Australiana. He had one of the largest private collections of books in Sydney. He purchased the vast photographic archive of Kerry & Co., "Sydney's largest photographic studio of the late 1800s and early 1900s." Tyrrell named his purchase The Tyrrell Collection and originally intended it to be displayed in a private museum of ethnography. In 1980, after this plan did not come to fruition, the collection finally passed to the Australian Consolidated Press, which in turn donated many of the images to major Australian museums and libraries, such as the Powerhouse Museum and the National Library of Australia.

== Reception ==
Literary figures would often gather in Tyrrell's shops, which acted as stimulating cultural centres. For example, the roomy Castlereagh bookshop:

became "a veritable treasurehouse" ... where artists, writers and collectors met to browse, to bargain, or just talk. It was crammed with paintings, prints, china, bronze, jade, ivories, coins, medals, and, of course, books.

To express their gratitude several wrote poems, including: Henry Lawson's "The Song of Tyrrell's Bell" Kenneth Slessor's "In Tyrrell's Bookshop", and Roderic Quinn's "Tyrrell's Bookshop".

== Personal life and death ==
James Tyrrell married Matilda Bourne of Dunedin, New Zealand on 17 August 1898. They had a son, James Eric, and a daughter, Dorothy. One of James's brothers, George, was a secondhand bookseller in lower William Street, Sydney.

He died in Cammeray, Sydney on 30 July 1961.

After his death Tyrrell's Bookshop was managed by his son John and his grandson William ("Bill"). In 1971 it moved to 328 Pacific Highway, Crows Nest.

== Select bibliography ==
- James R. Tyrrell, The Growth of a City: Sydney Old and New, a Contrast: 48 Comparative Views of the Growth of Sydney (Sydney: J. R. Tyrrell, 1914)
- James R. Tyrrell, Old Books, Old Friends, Old Sydney (Sydney: Angus & Robertson, 1952)
- James R. Tyrrell, Postscript: Further Bookselling Reminiscences by James Tyrrell Together with the Poems of James Lionel Murphy as transcribed by Henry Kendall (Sydney: Tyrrells, 1957)
- James R. Tyrrell, Australian Aboriginal Place-names and Their Meanings (Sydney: Simmons, 1933)
- James R. Tyrrell, David Scott Mitchell: A Reminiscence (Sydney: Sunnybrook Press, 1936)
