= Frederick Wymark =

Australian book collector and bookseller

Frederick Victor Grey Wymark
- Born: 6 October 1872; Stawell, Victoria, Australia
- Died: `19 October 1942 (aged 80); Church Point, New South Wales, Australia
- Occupations: Bookseller, book and manuscript collector, collector of Australiana

Frederick Victor Grey Wymark (6 October 1872 – 19 October 1942) was an Australian Australiana collector, book collector and bookseller.

== Biography ==
Wymark was born in Stawell, Victoria to a local Victorian mother and British father, he came to Sydney in 1884 and grew up in Wooloomooloo, when David Angus opened a book store in Market Street, Sydney, Wymark became his assistant and was then apprenticed by Angus in 1890, Angus subsequently with his business partner established the retailer Angus & Robertson bookstores. After David Angus died in 1900, Wymark took over the majority share of the company with George Robertson. Wymark died in Church Point, New South Wales in 1942.

== See also ==
- David Scott Mitchell
- Norman Alfred Williams Lindsay
