= Darlington, New South Wales =

Darlington
- Suburb
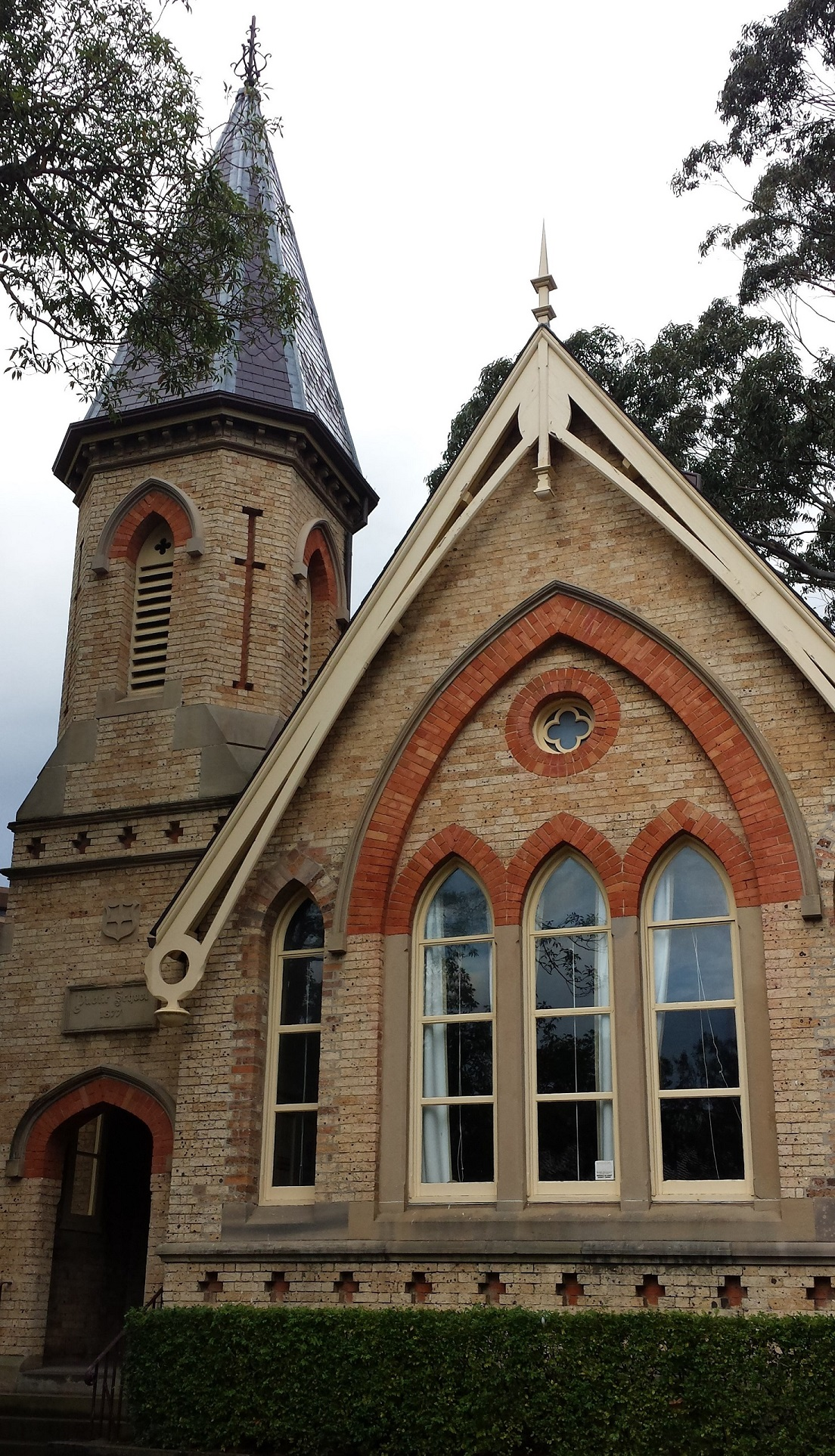
- Old Darlington school survived the University of Sydney expansion and is located in Maze Crescent

- Interactive map of Darlington
- Country: Australia
- State: New South Wales
- City: Sydney
- LGA: City of Sydney
- Location: 3 km (1.9 mi) south of Sydney CBD

Government
  - State electorate: Newtown
  - Federal division: Grayndler, Sydney

Area
  - Total: 0.38 km^{2} (0.15 sq mi)

Population
  - Total: 2,597 (SAL 2021)
  - Density: 6,820/km^{2} (17,700/sq mi)
- Postcode: 2008
Suburbs around Darlington
Camperdown	Chippendale	Surry Hills
Newtown	Darlington	Redfern
Eveleigh	Eveleigh	Redfern

Darlington is a small, inner-city suburb of Sydney, New South Wales, Australia. Darlington is located about three kilometres south of the Sydney central business district and is part of the local government area of the City of Sydney. At the time of its incorporation in 1864, it had the distinction of being the smallest municipality in the Sydney metropolitan area, at a mere 44 acres. Darlington is bordered by City Road, Cleveland Street, Golden Grove Street, Wilson Street and Abercrombie Street.

== History ==
=== First Nations history of Darlington ===
The first Aboriginal inhabitants of Darlington were the Cadigal people of the Eora belonging to the wider Dharug language group. The Cadigal were a coastal people who subsisted on fishing, hunting land animals and gathering shellfish and plants. Darlington was part of their southern range bordered by the Kameygal clan to the south at Botany Bay and the Wangal clan to the west.

=== British penal settlement and European colonisation ===
The earliest recorded British history of Darlington is linked to school purposes when in 1789, Governor Arthur Phillip received instructions from England to set aside land in the new penal colony for church and school use. In 1819, fifty two acres of land was given to William Hutchinson by Governor Lachlan Macquarie. In 1835, a 28 acres land grant was made to William Shepherd by Governor Richard Bourke. It had been promised earlier in 1827 by Governor Ralph Darling and in his honour, Shepherd named the fruit and flower farm he established 'Shepherd's Darling Nursery'. His nursery is still remembered today in many Darlington street names such as Ivy, Pine, Myrtle, Rose, Vine and Shepherd Streets. By 1844, the Hutchinson estate, much of Shepherd's Nursery and a portion of the adjoining 96 acre land grant to William Chippendale comprised much of present-day Darlington.

=== Subdivision and industrialisation ===
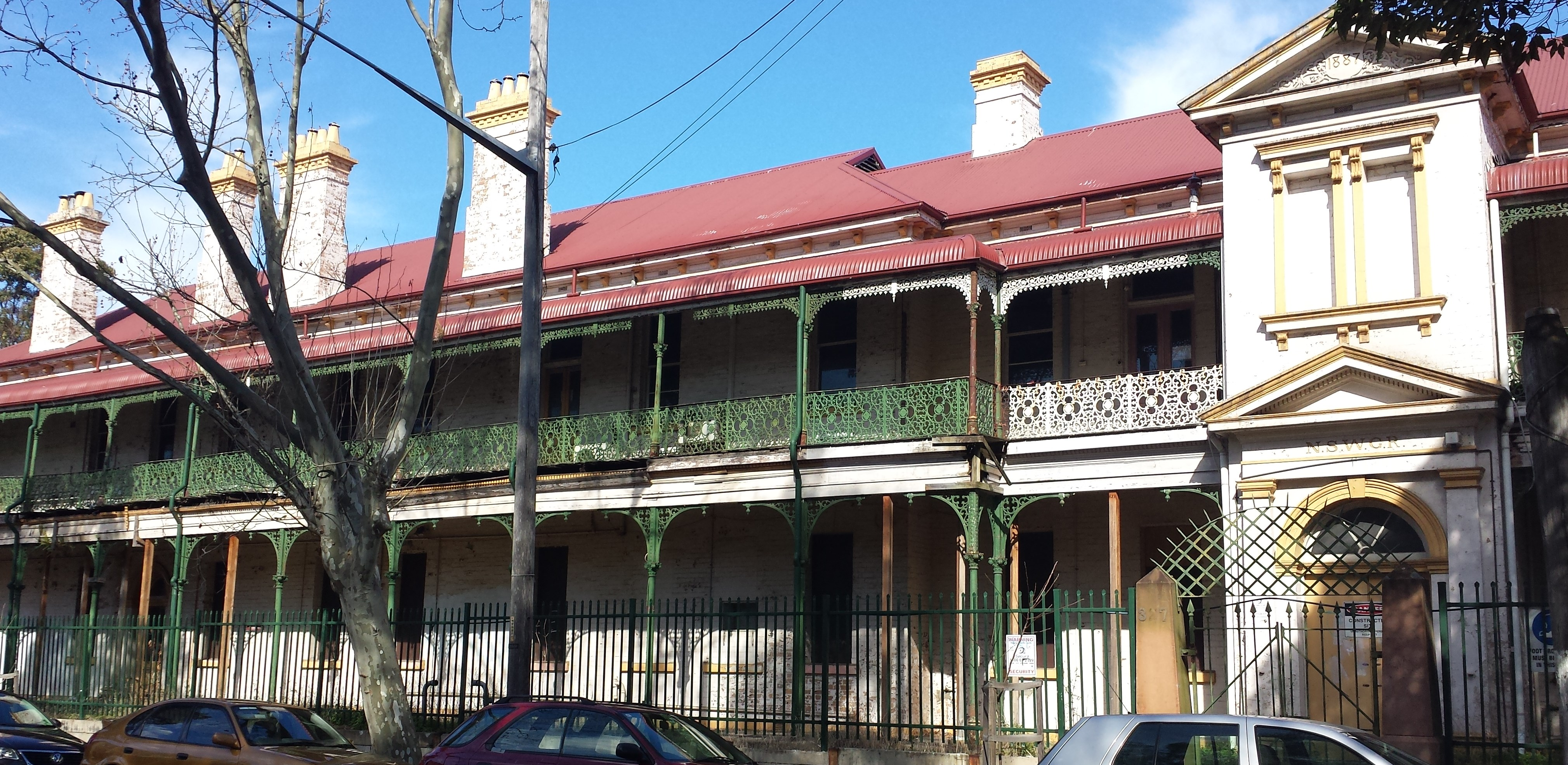
Chief Mechanical Engineers Office, built 1887 for the Eveleigh Railway Workshops, Wilson St (2015)

By the late 1850s, the University of Sydney to the north of Darlington, at the site of the former Grose Farm was established. The incorporation of Darlington was proclaimed on 16 September 1864 and the first council was elected. The origin of the suburb's name is arguable, possibly being derived from Governor Ralph Darling and the Darling Nursery, or from William Vane, 3rd Earl of Darlington, a well known British politician during the early years of the New South Wales Colony. Rapid subdivision of Darlington continued in the 1880s but by 1891, Darlington was regarded as a slum and was the most densely populated suburb of Sydney. By the late 1890s, the Eveleigh Railway Workshops had been built and were employing many local workers. Other industries operating in Darlington at this time included the Henry Jones and Co. jam factory, iron foundry, a zinc and brass works, two cabinet factories, a cordial factory, a boot factory, a portmanteau factory and other small industries.

=== Sydney University expansion ===
In the late 1950s, the Government of New South Wales re-zoned some 70 acres of the Darlington area as a ‘special uses’ area, for government institutions such as The Department of Housing and the University of Sydney to extend its campus across City Road into Darlington. This resulted, despite increasing community opposition and resentment, in the demolition of about 650 houses as well as shops, factories, banks, the post office, the Town Hall and other amenities, and the population of Darlington decreased by about 2,000.

Factories and light industries have mostly closed, and the suburb has experienced residential consolidation and urban renewal since the 1990s.

== Population ==
=== Demographics ===
Historical population
Year	Pop.	±%
2001	2,042	—
2006	2,183	+6.9%
2011	2,243	+2.7%
2016	3,097	+38.1%
2021	2,597	−16.1%

At the 2021 census the population of Darlington had dropped to 2,597.

According to the 2016 census, there were 3,097 residents in Darlington. The median age was 25 years old compared to the Australian median of 38 years old. In Darlington, 44.8% of people were born in Australia. The most common other countries of birth were China 20.2%, England 3.0% and New Zealand 2.2%. 55.2% of people only spoke English at home. Other languages spoken at home included Mandarin at 19.6%. 60.9% of Darlington respondents reported 'no religion' compared to the total for Australia at 29.6%. The next most common responses were Catholic 9.9%, Buddhism 4.3% and Anglican 3.2%. 81.5% of residents had never married compared to the Australian figure of 35.0%.

== Commercial area ==
Abercrombie St at Lawson Street has become the commercial focus of Darlington since the university expansion in the 1960s. This street has a number of cafes, restaurants, small grocery and other businesses. Commercial businesses also operate within the Sydney University Darlington campus. Broadway Shopping Centre, King Street, Newtown and Redfern Street shopping areas are also nearby.

== Parks and open spaces ==
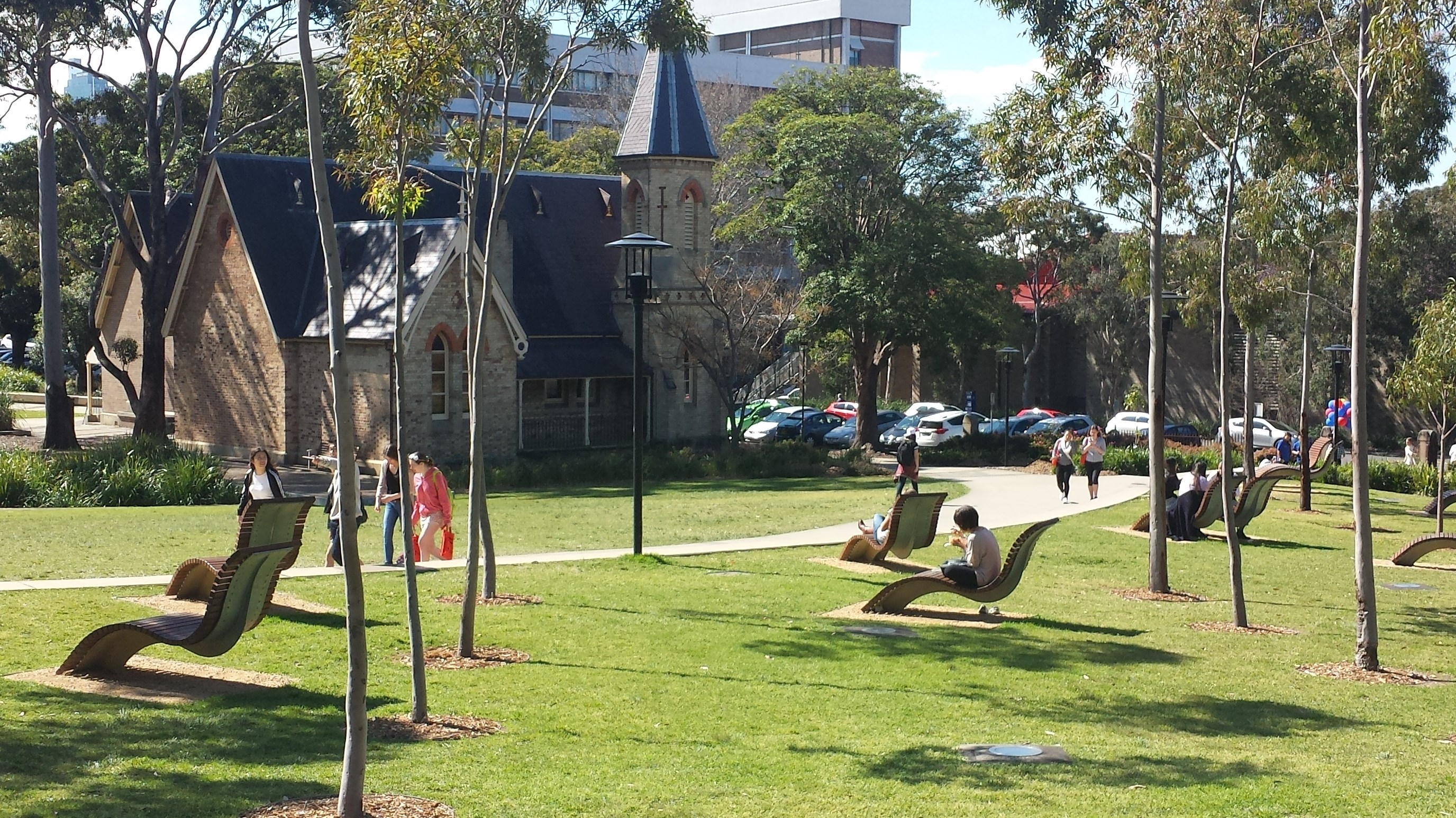
Old Darlington school, now the centrepiece of Sydney University's Cadigal Green

Sydney University's Cadigal Green is the largest park in Darlington and contains the old Darlington School, seating and a wetland. Charles Kernan Reserve on Abercrombie St is named after a former local resident and has playground facilities, public BBQs and a community garden. Other parks include the Vine Sreett playground and a pocket park located on the corner of Boundary and Shepherd Streets. Other large parks within walking distance include Victoria Park, Prince Alfred Park and Redfern Park.

== Architecture ==
=== Housing ===
The opening of the Eveleigh Railway Workshops in the 1880s was the major stimulus for the building of Victorian worker's terraces in Darlington. This style of housing dominated the suburb and housed the workers for the railway workshops and nearby industries. Some earlier workers cottages dating from the 1870s-1880s remain in Thomas and Vine Streets.

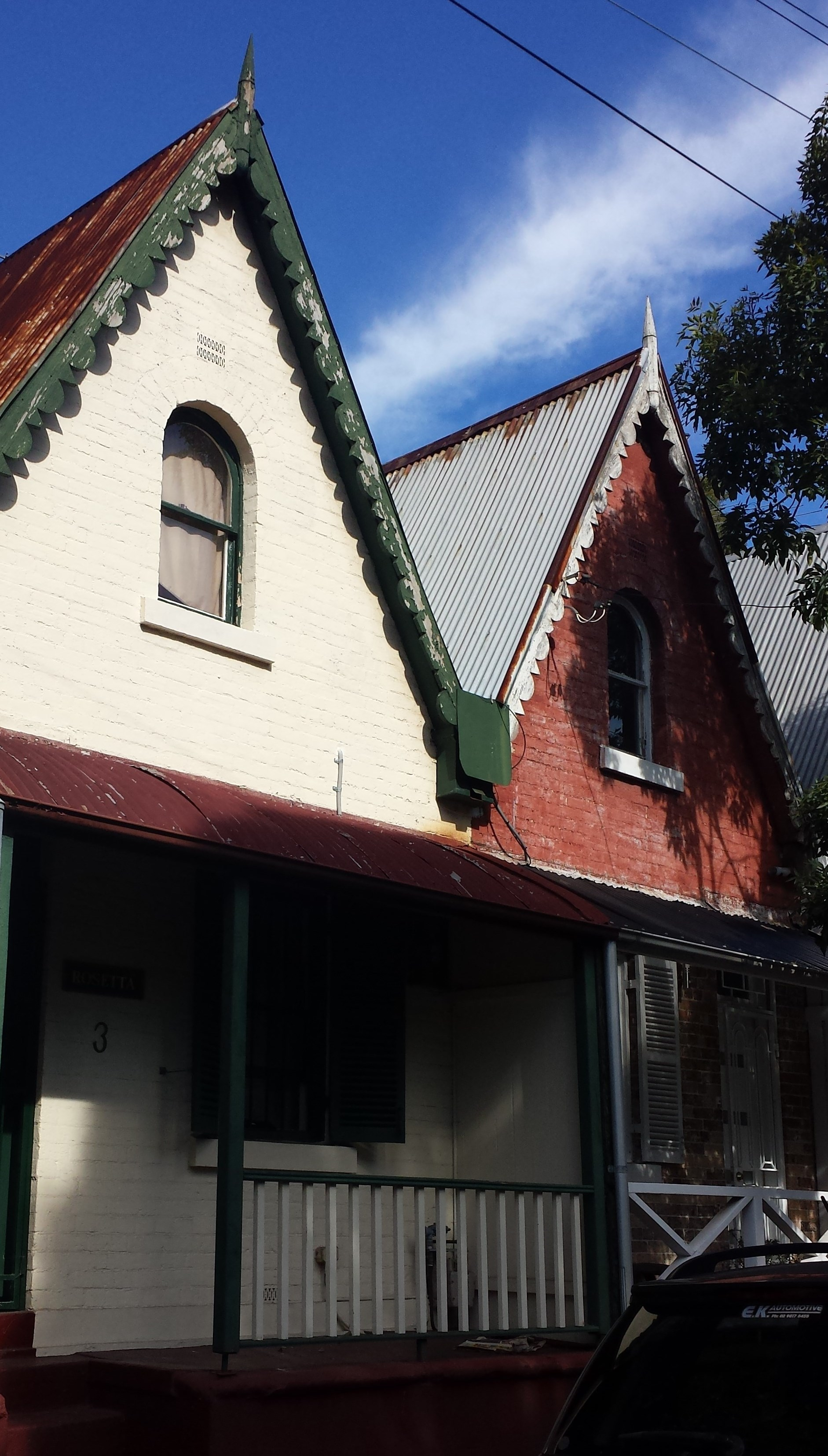
Rare gabled worker's cottages 1870s-1880s

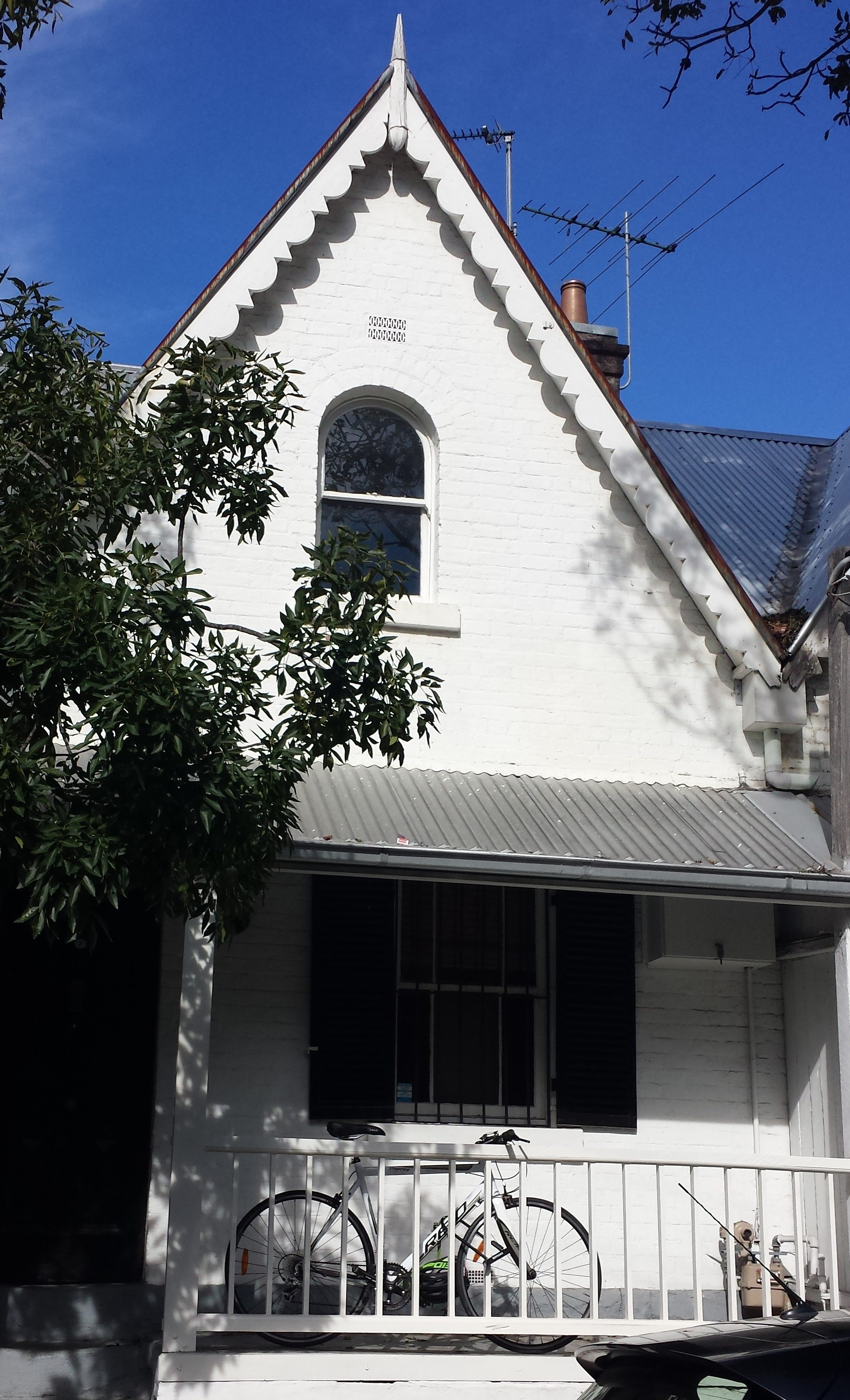
Gabled worker's cottage 1870s-1880s

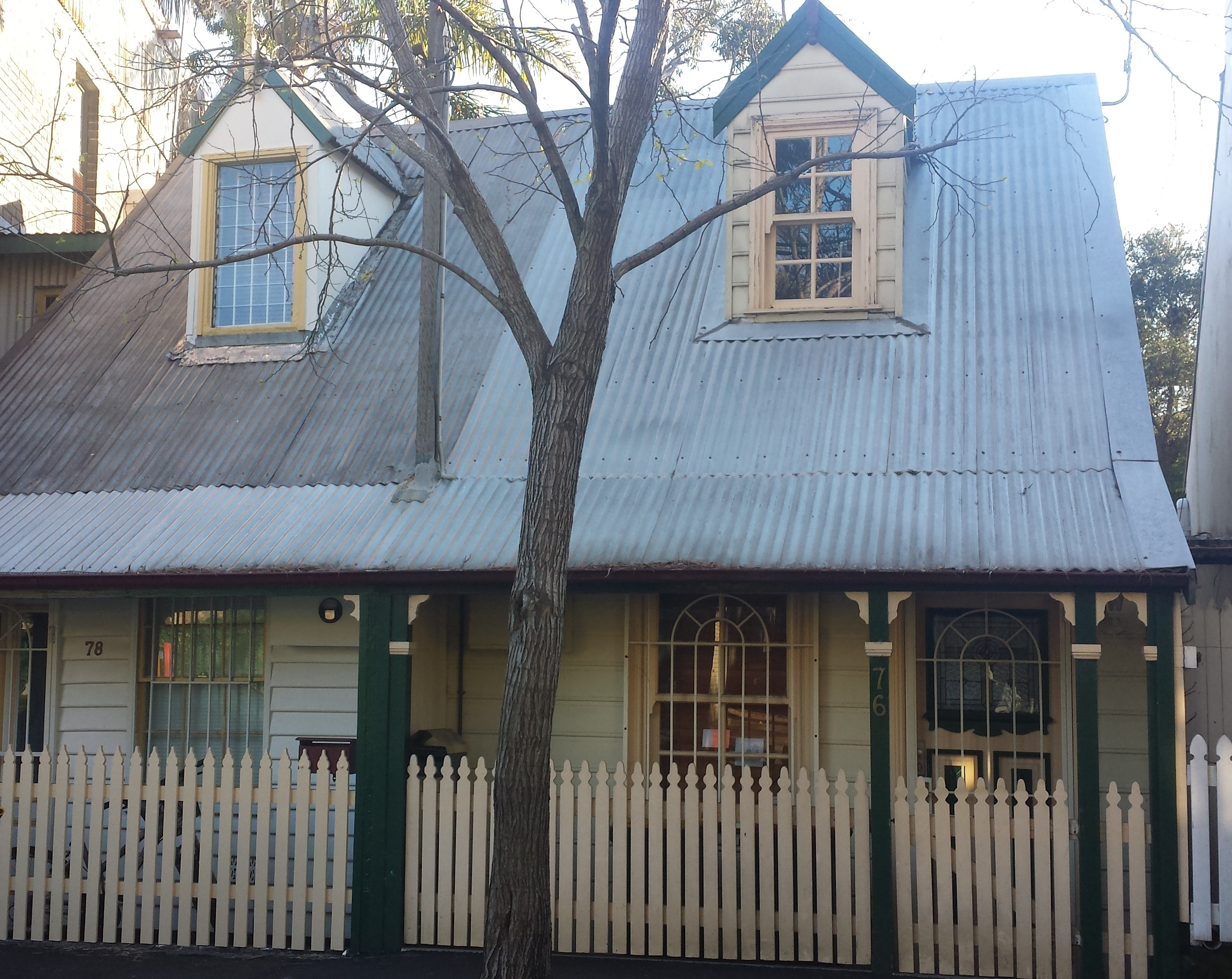
Worker's cottages 1870s-1880s

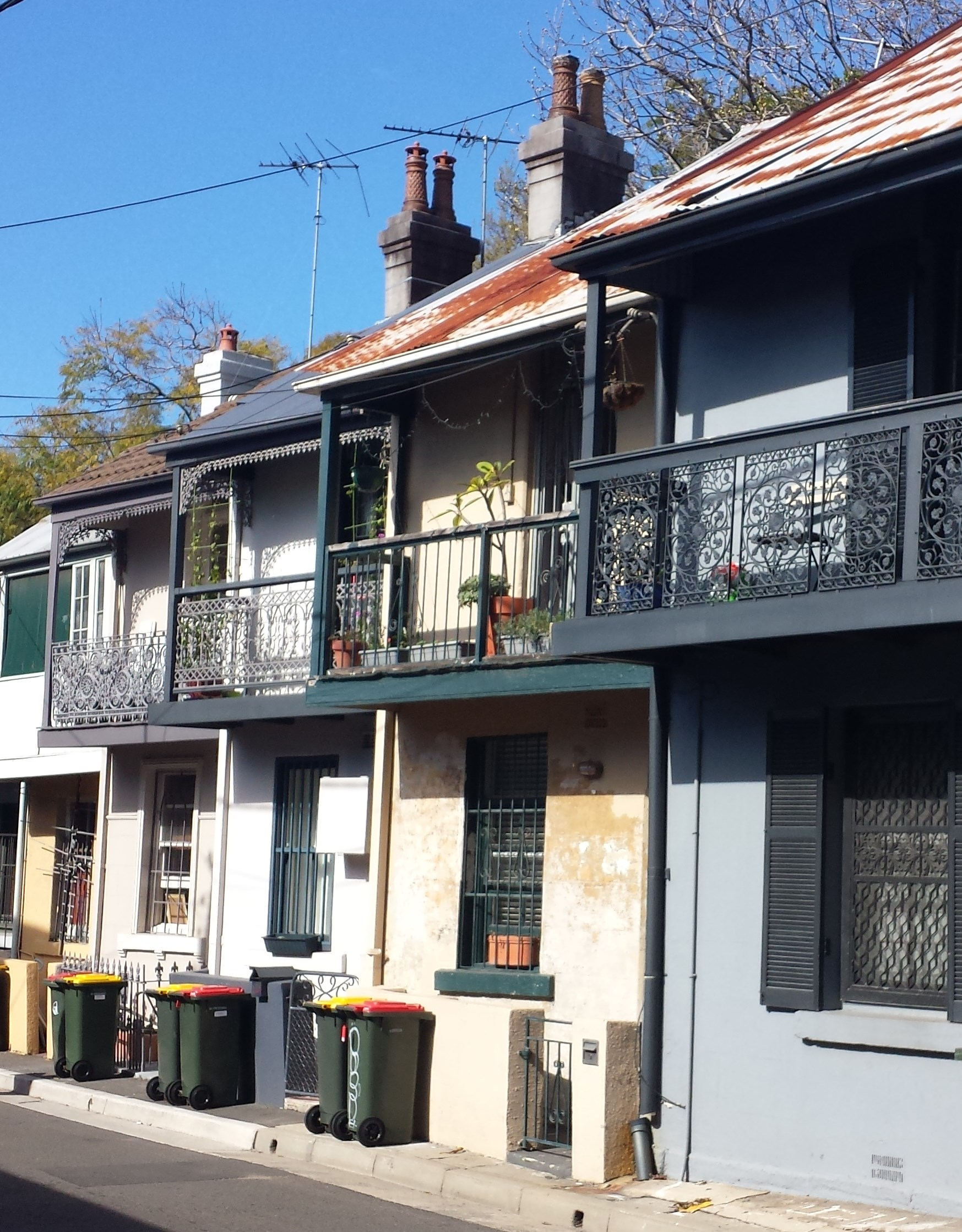
Stepped terraces 1880s-1890s

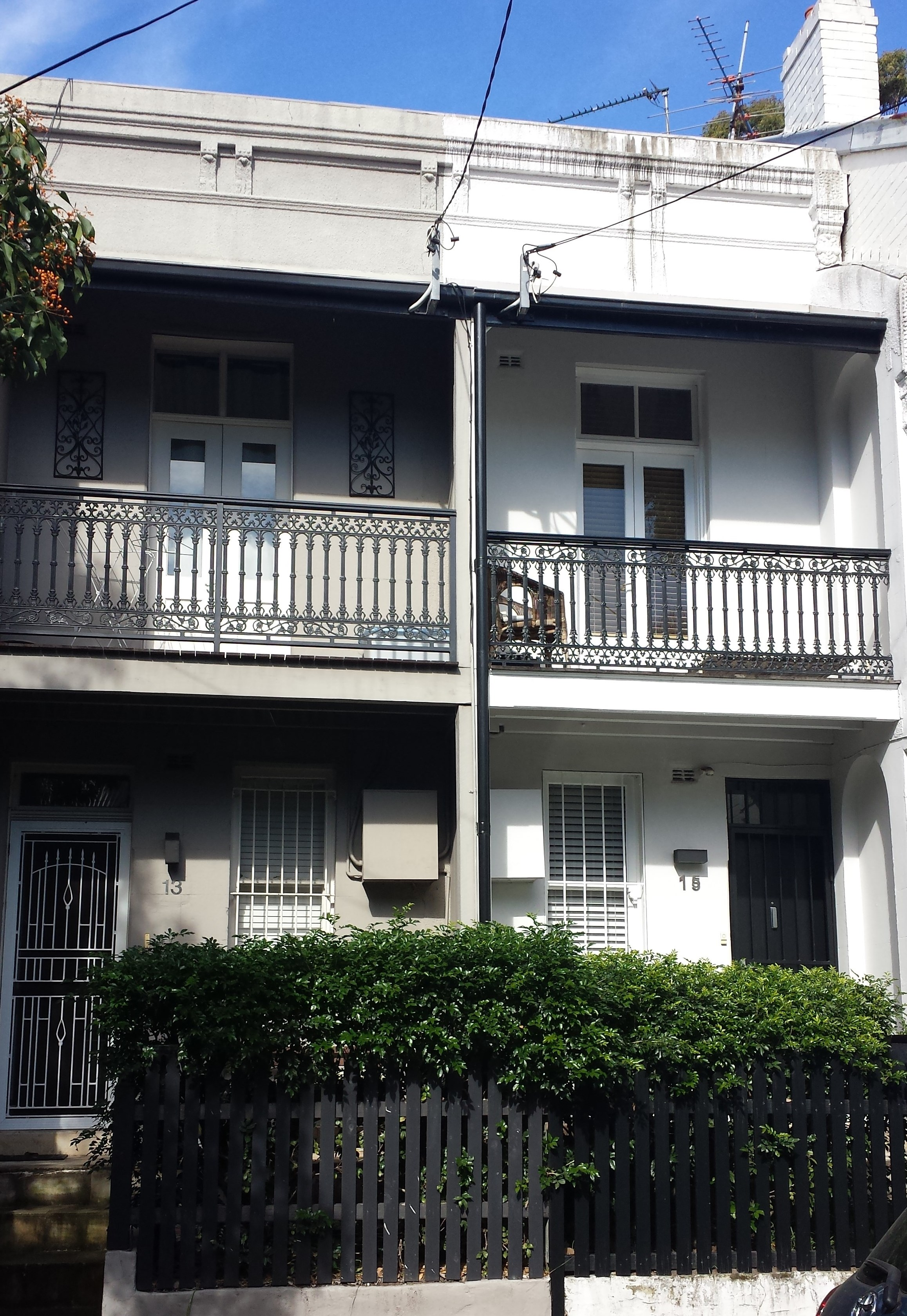
Renovated terraces 1880s-1890s

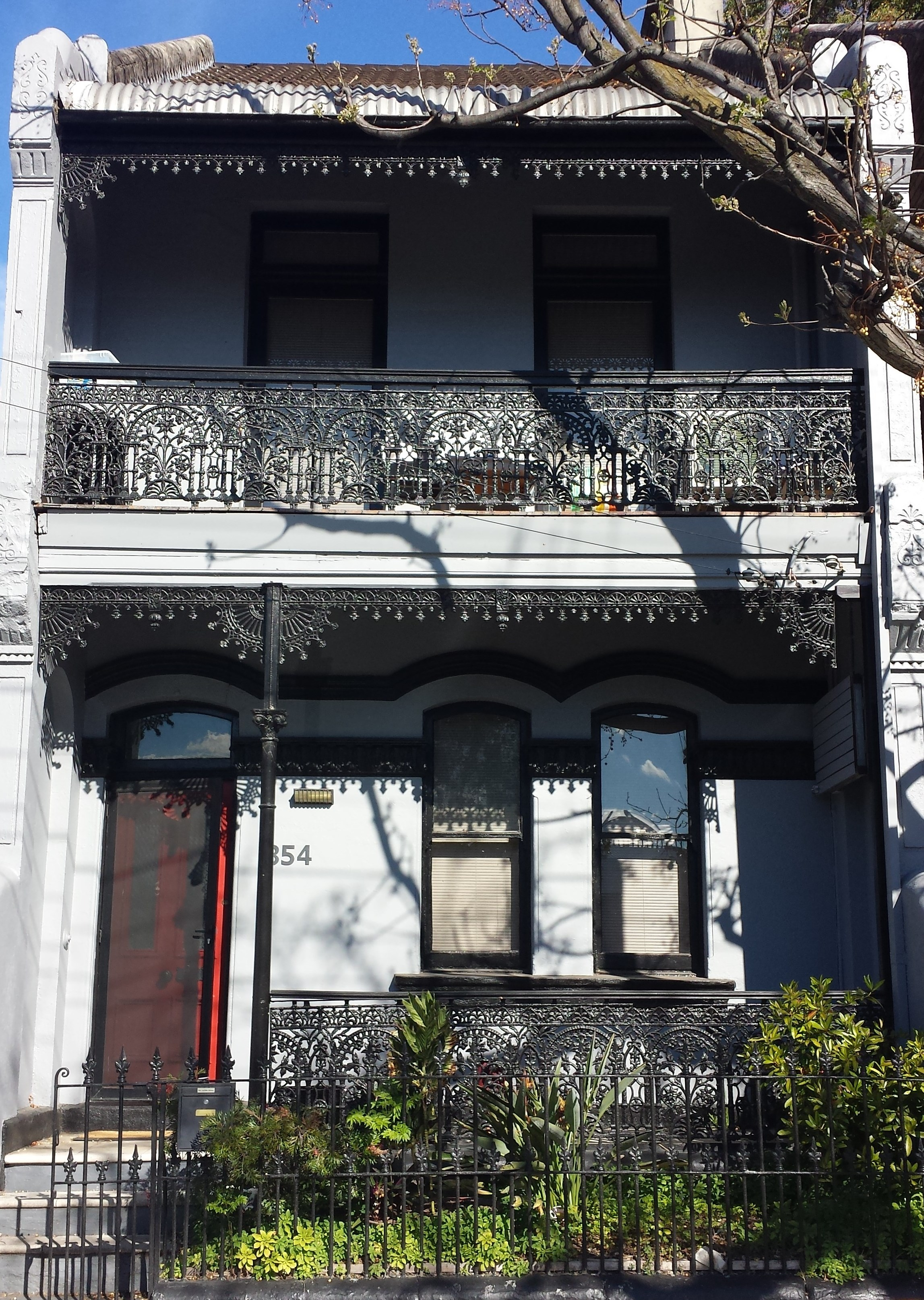
Renovated terrace 1880s-1890s

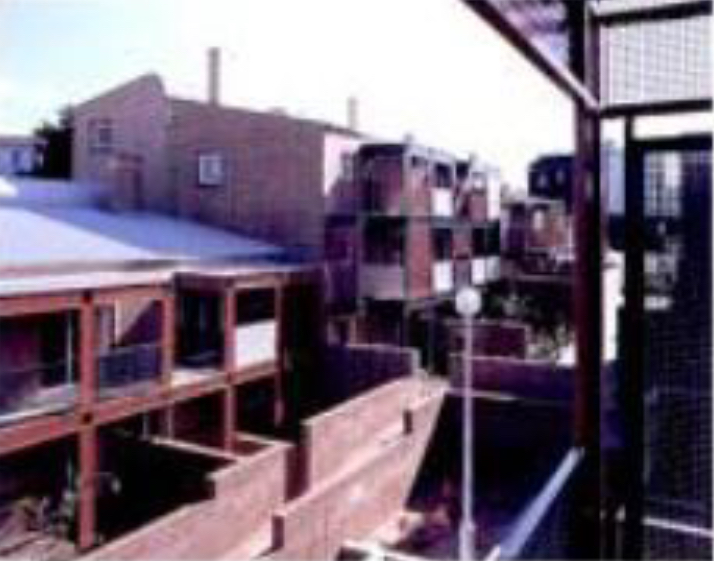
Social housing Estate on Golden Grove street bordering Newtown 1970s-1980s

=== Adaptive reuse ===
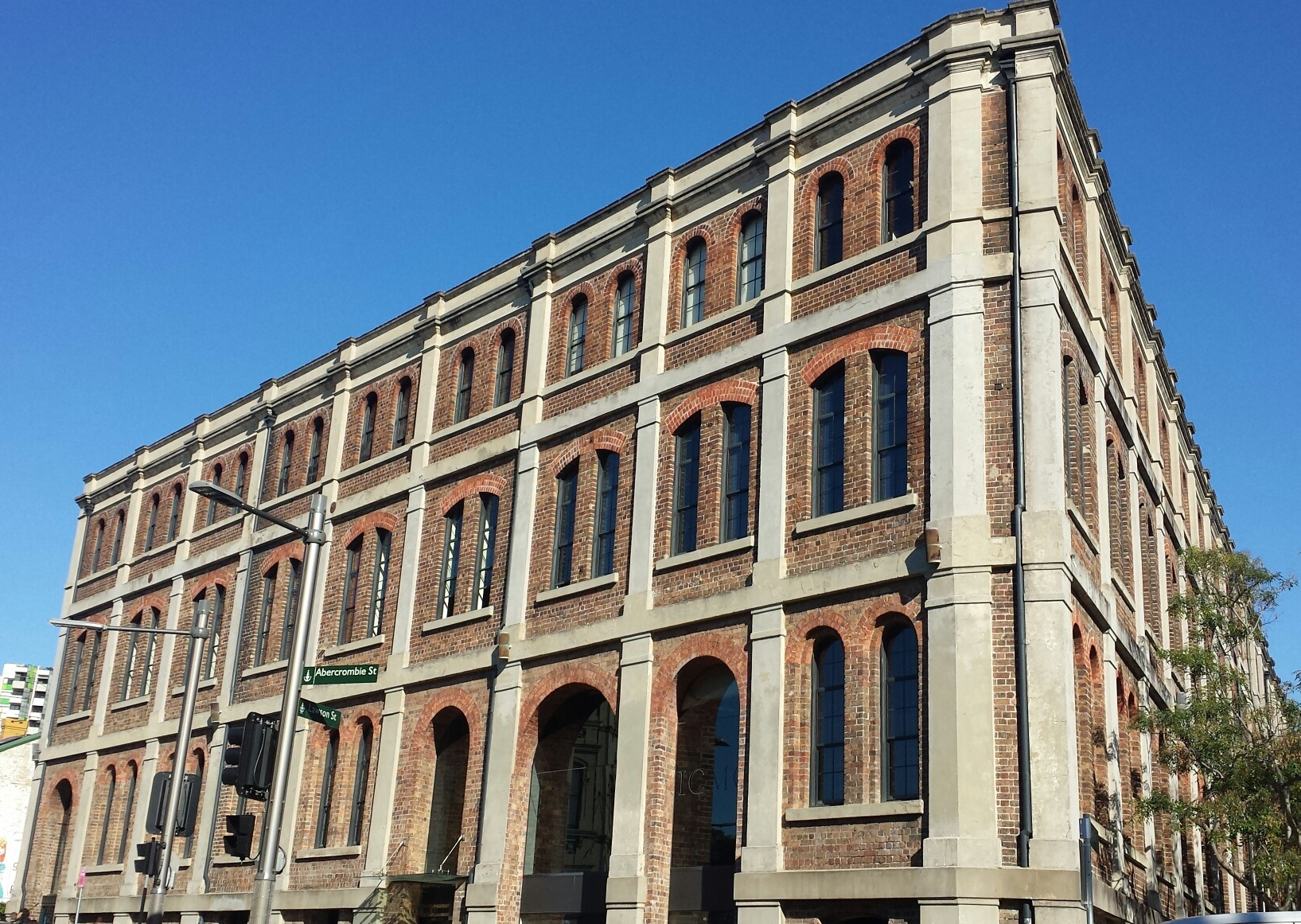
The Federation warehouse style McMurtrie Kellerman & Company Building built in 1883

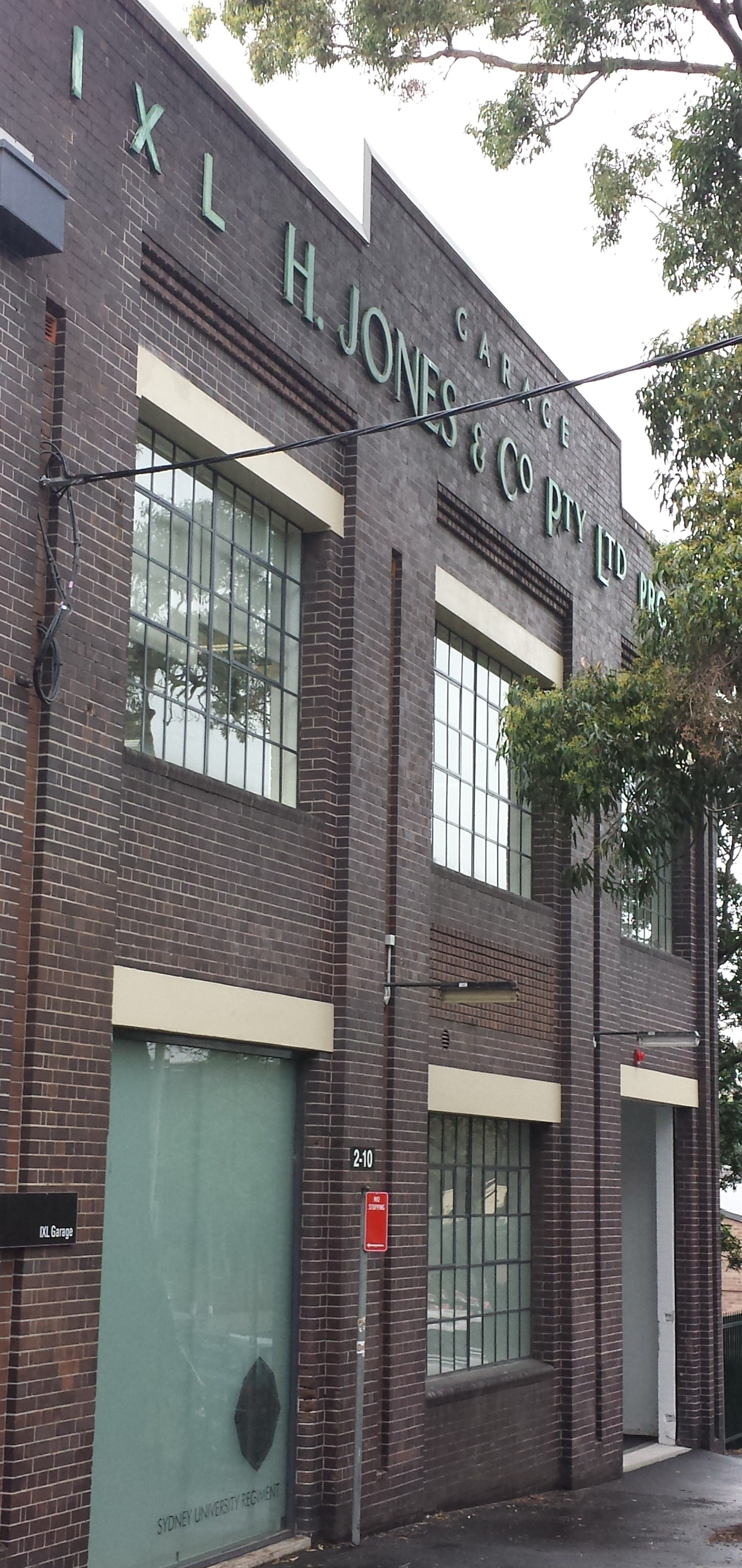
Former IXL Garage, Golden Grove Street

The McMurtrie, Kellermann & Co factory stands on the corner of Abercrombie and Lawson Streets and is a landmark in the local neighbourhood marking the junction of five streets. This former boot factory represents the industrial development of Darlington from the late nineteenth century to the mid twentieth century and is historically significant for its connection to the Australian manufacturing of shoes from the 1880s to the 1920s and gas metres from the 1920s to the 1960s. The former factory also represents the historical development of the labour movement as the site of large strikes in 1935 protesting the replacement of skilled with unskilled workers. It was converted into residential and commercial space in 2002.

The IXL Garage building on Golden Grove Street was built in 1937 as a motor garage for the Henry Jones and Company factory and represents the industrial development of Darlington during the mid-twentieth century. It is historically significant for its connection to the development of the Australian food processing industry for jams, tinned fruits and other processed foods. The construction of the garage to house delivery trucks for the former IXL jam factory also represents technological advancements of the inter-war period through the growing use of motor vehicles for the distribution of products.

Examples of adaptive reuse in Darlington include several buildings converted into residential or mixed use, including:

- the former "tinshed" industrial site on the corner of Wilson and Shepherd Streets
- the former Blue Diamond Furniture factory on Boundary St
- The former Dempsey factory, the site of a successful legal case for communal residential living in 1978, designed by Col James, who lived there until shortly before his death in 2013
- Former automotive repair premises, Abercrombie Street
- The NSW Institution for the Deaf, Dumb and Blind on City Road was the first school for the deaf in Australia. Benjamin Backhouse was appointed architect and the building was constructed in phases from the 1880s with additions until 1929. It is an eclectic mixture of late Victorian architectural styles featuring polychromatic brickwork, with flanking towers with Burgundian (French) style pyramidal roofs including dormers and decorative metal finials. The superintendent's residence for the NSW Deaf Dumb and Blind Institute is a Victorian Italianate two-storey bay fronted villa, typical of a suburban villa of the late 1880s, with popular decorative motifs in cast iron and render, and reflects the status associated with the position of Superintendent. The residence was probably designed by A.L. and G. McCredie who succeeded Benjamin Backhouse, the original architect, on his retirement in 1884. The residence and garden were enclosed with a dwarf stone wall and iron palisade in 1892. It was refurbished in 1990 and is now the Darlington Centre conference facility.
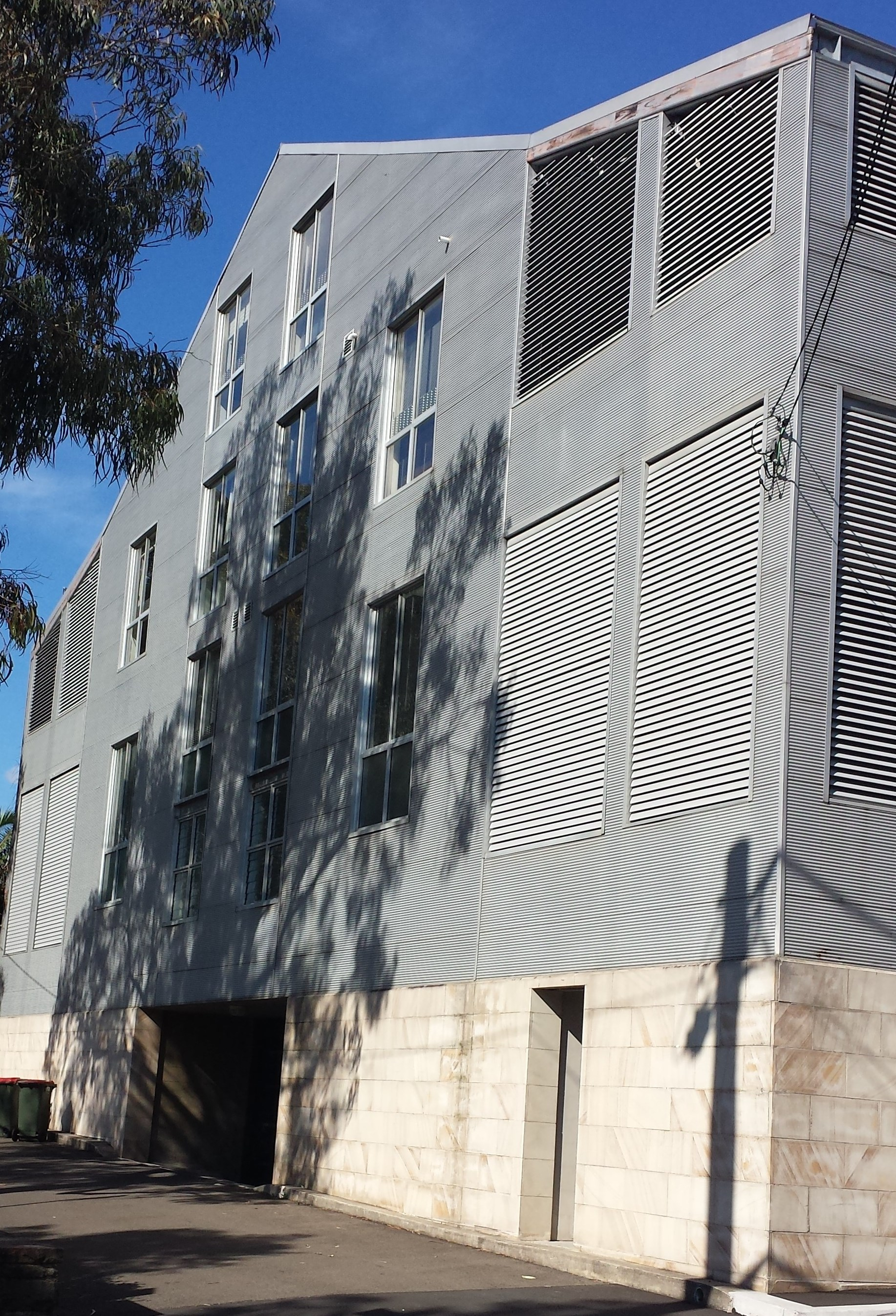
Tinshed, cnr Wilson/Shepherd St

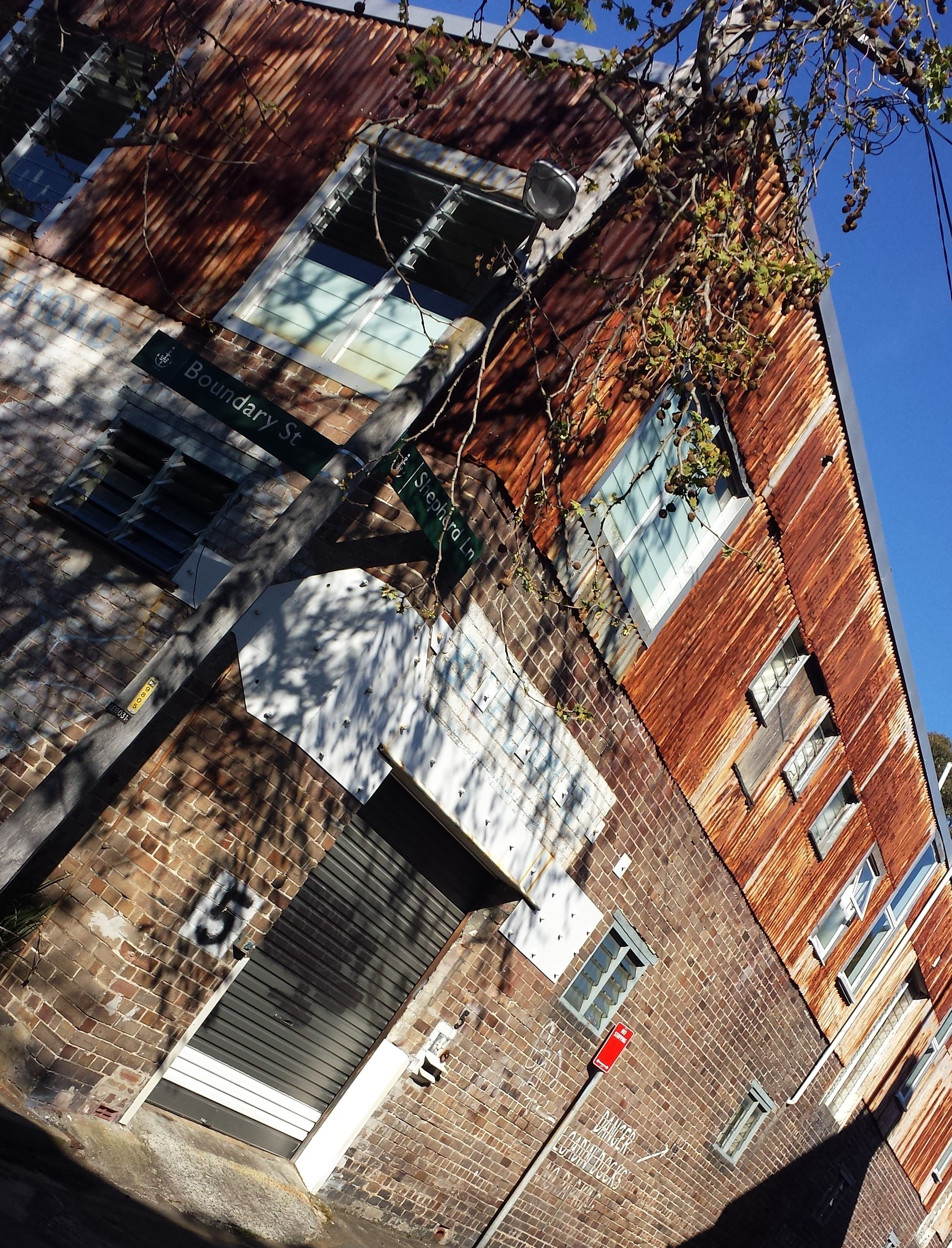
Blue Diamond Furniture factory, Boundary Street

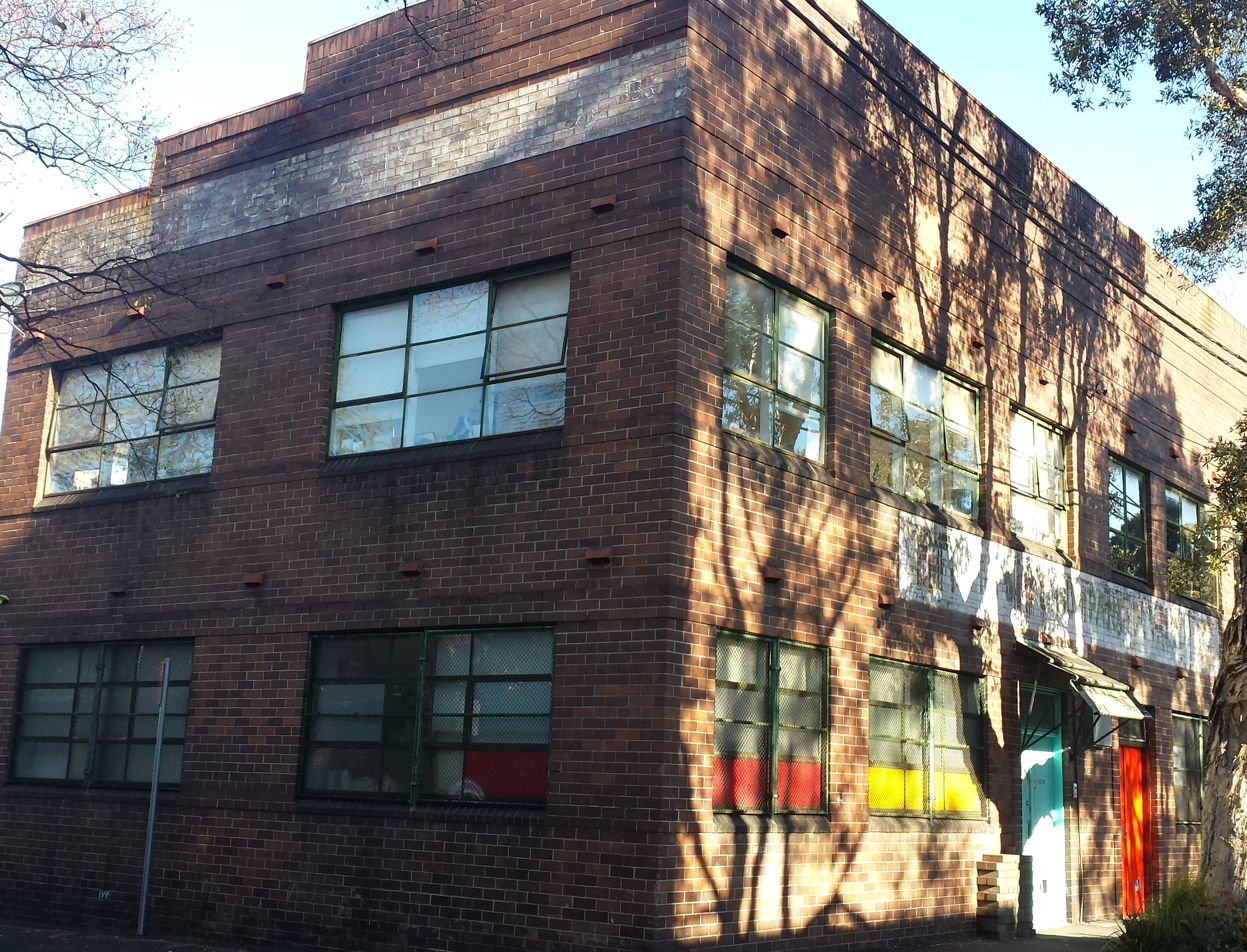
The former Dempsey factory

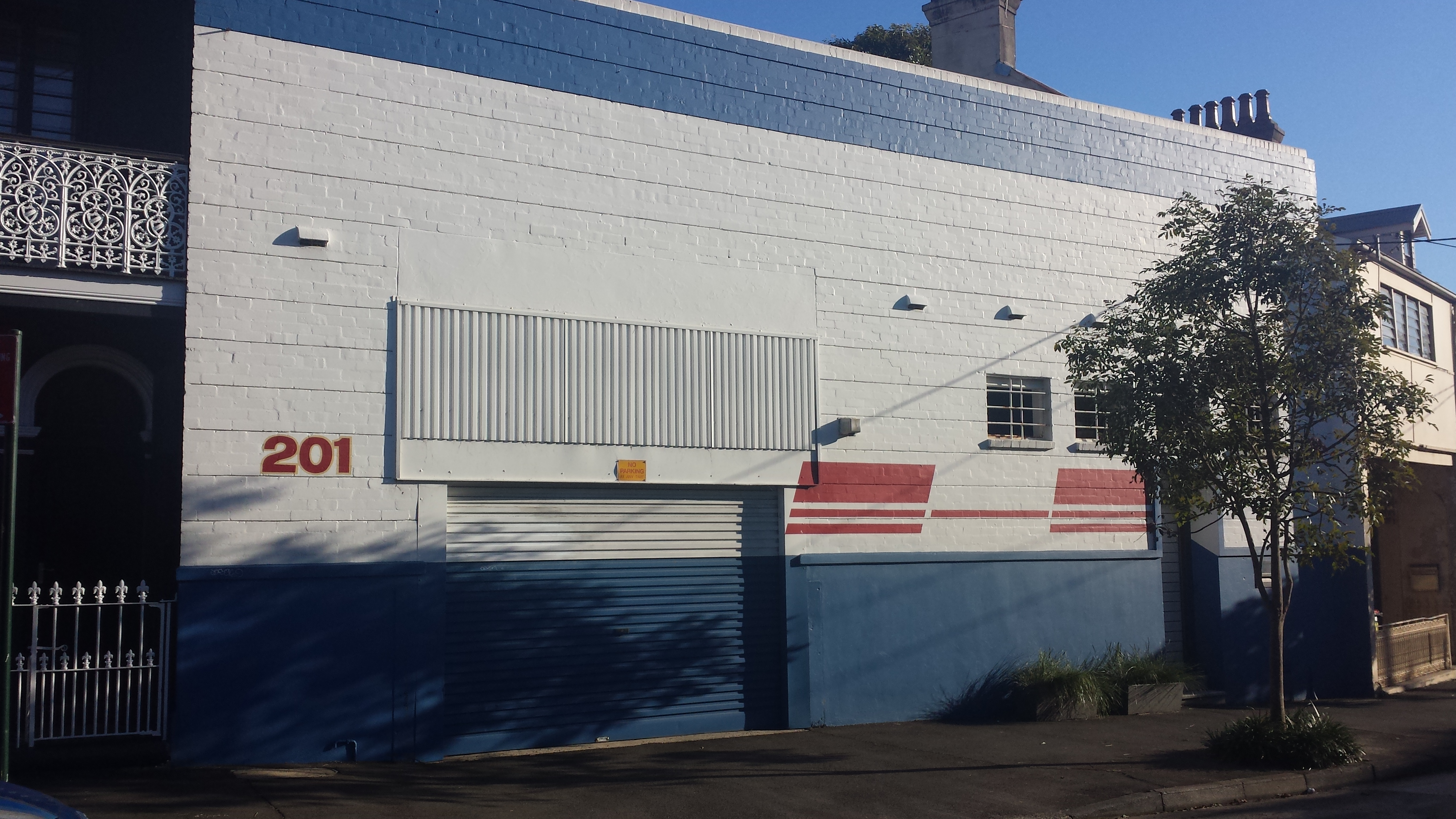
Former automotive repair premises, Abercrombie Street

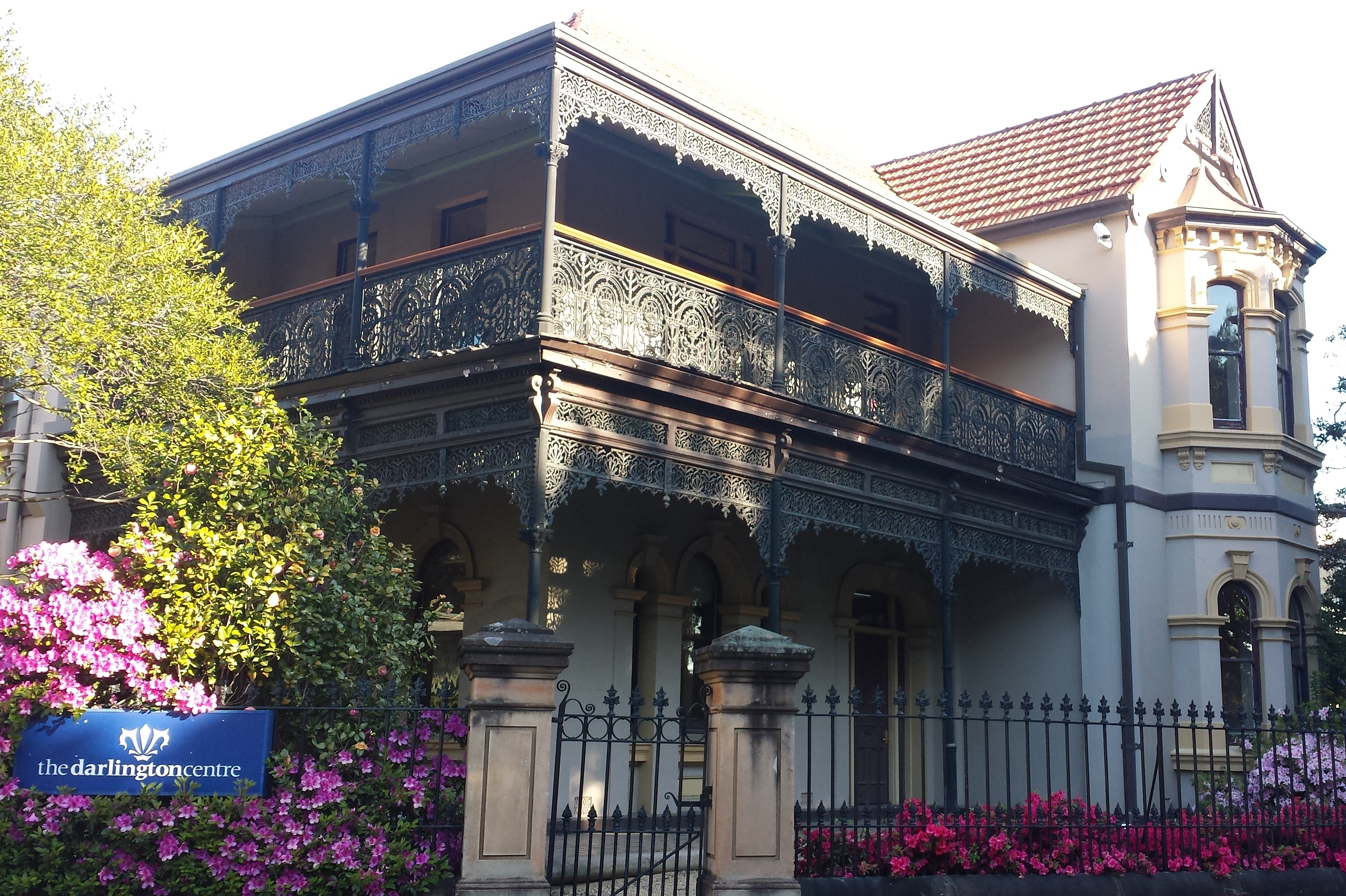
NSW Deaf Dumb and Blind Institute superintendent's residence, now Darlington Centre conference facility

The 1859 Cypress Hall on City Road, later called Leinster Hall, is a Regency villa built 1858–59, and concurrent with the Great Hall, is the oldest building at the University of Sydney. The nucleus of the villa remains highly intact, encapsulated within the walls of St Michael's College, which was built in 1929. The villa is only one of a very few substantial Regency buildings from this period that has survived in the inner western area of Sydney and is the only known surviving Regency building in the Darlington area.

The old Darlington School was designed in 1877 and was one of a number of single-storey suburban schools designed by the architect to the Council of Education, George Allen Mansfield and opened in 1878. It is a two-storey Gothic Revival style building constructed of polychromatic brickwork, with a spire and a slate roof. It was transferred to the University of Sydney in 1976.

=== Modern ===
The Jane Foss Russell building in the grounds of Sydney University was named after Jane Foss Barff (née Russell) who became the first woman to receive a Master of Arts at Sydney University in 1889. It was built with multiple green glass facades and panels of different colors, types and styles covering different sides of the building. It features a large outdoor plaza with tiered seating, function space and cafes, interesting architectural themes and dynamic use of building materials. External balconies, terraced areas extending between floors, bleachers and an assortment of sitting areas are incorporated into the building's design. The Gordon Yu-Hoi Chiu Building, University of Sydney, received the 1998 RAIA NSW Architecture Award for Public Buildings. The new Abercrombie precinct will be home for the new University of Sydney Business School.

Modern architecture in Darlington
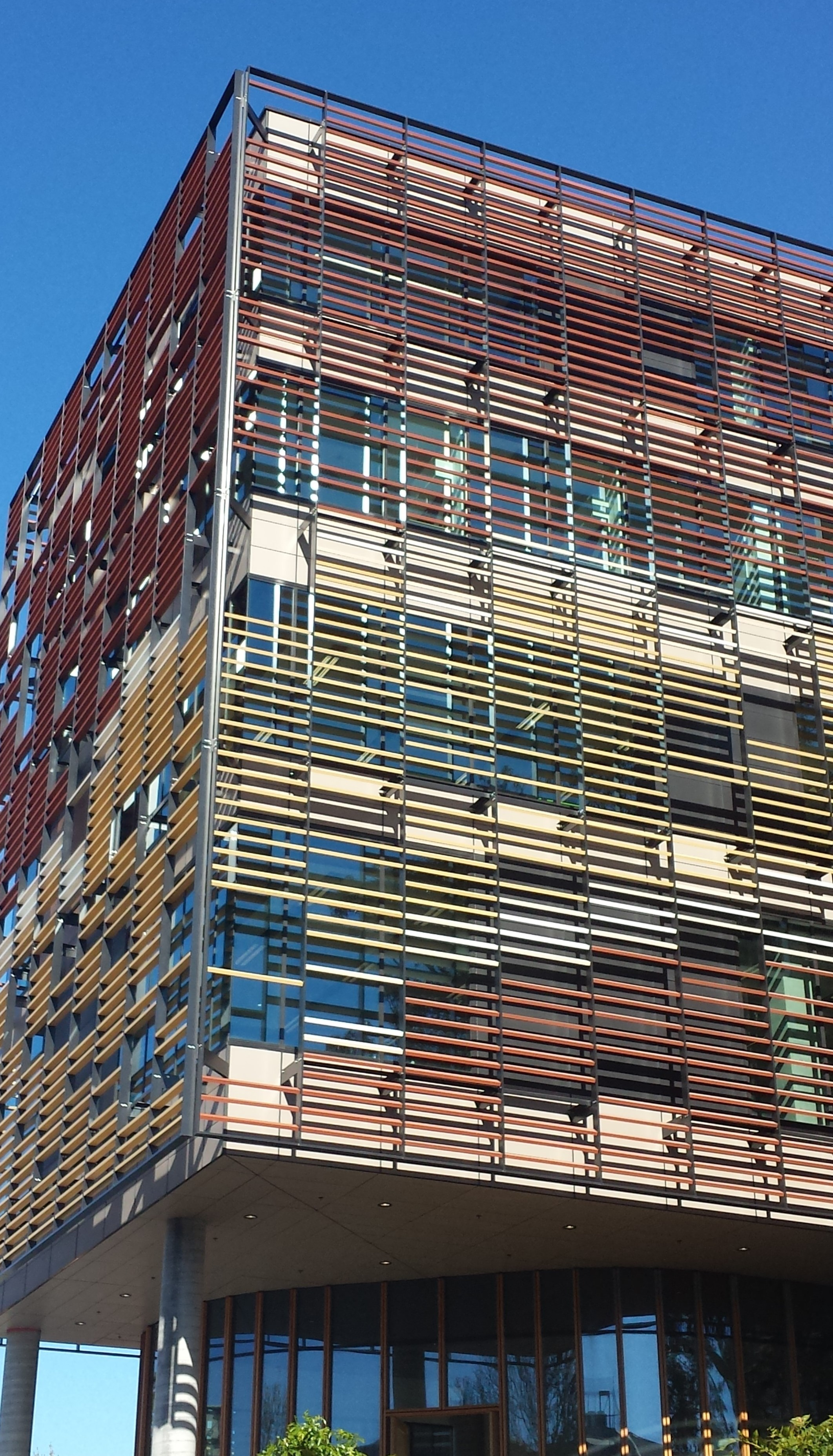
The new Abercrombie precinct features bold modern design

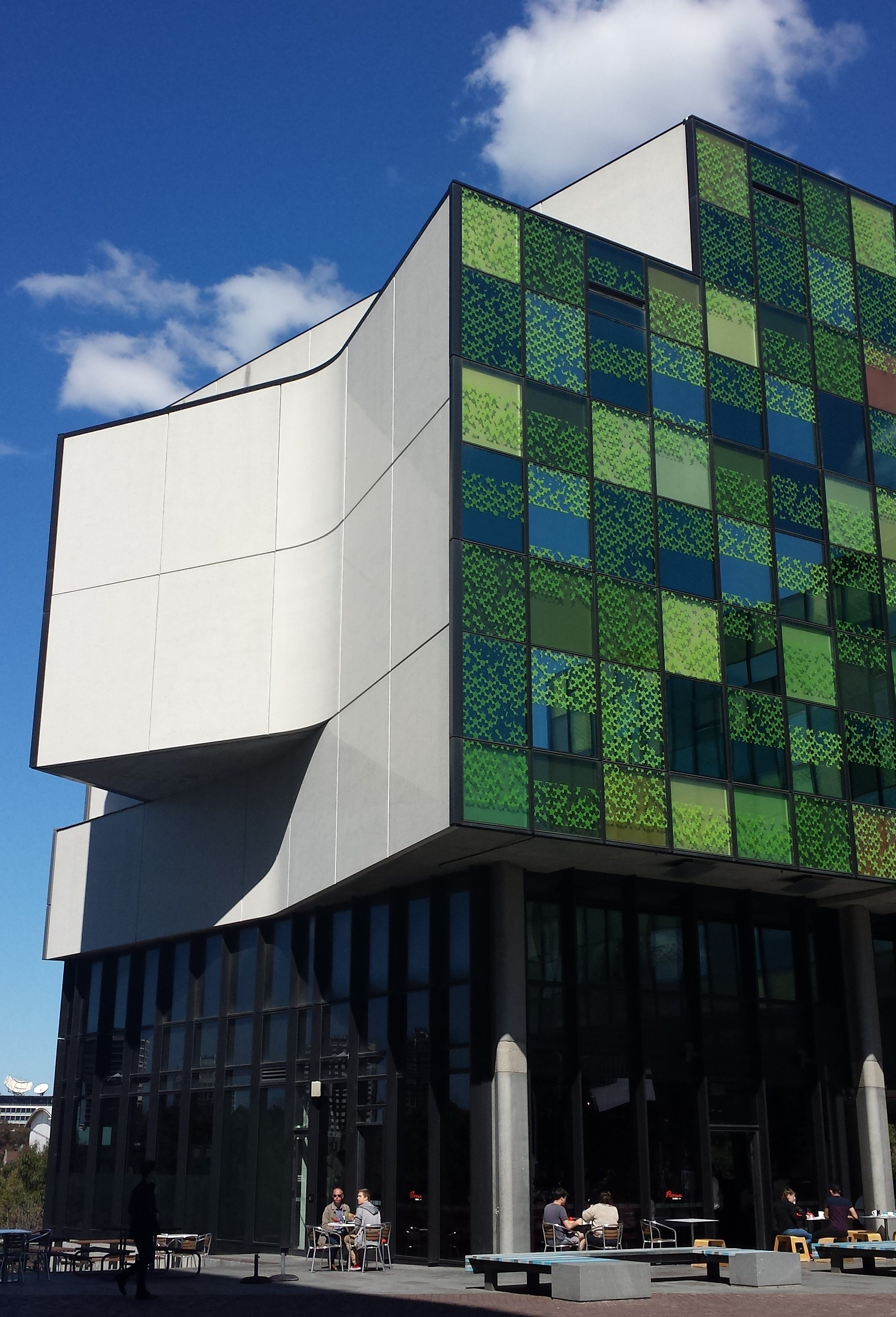
The Jane Foss Russell Building in the Sydney University Darlington campus

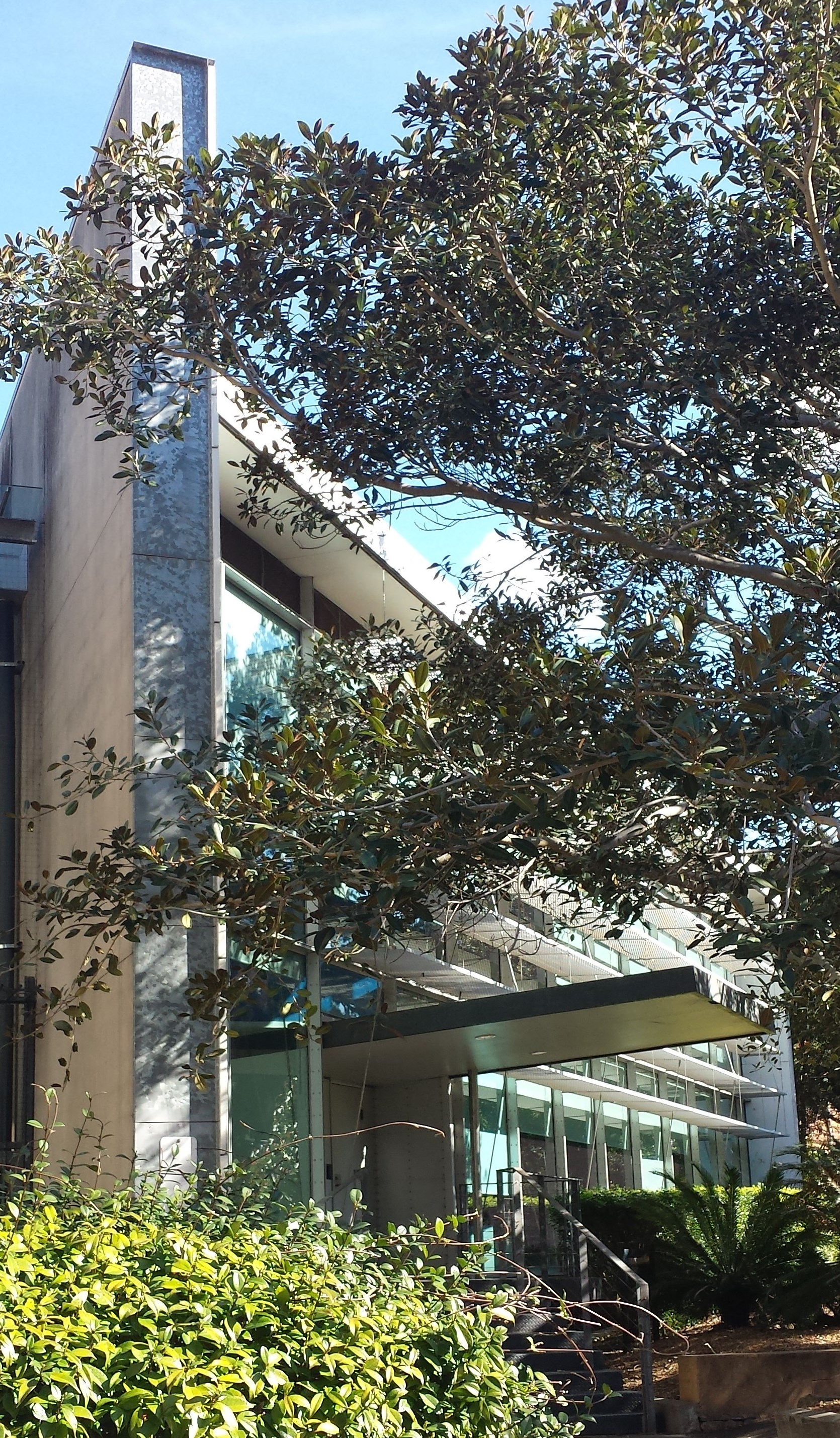
The Gordon Yu-Hoi Chiu Building in Sydney University

== Education ==
Darlington Public School is located on Abercrombie St for Preschool to Year 6.

TAFE NSW Eora (formerly the Eora Centre) is a campus of TAFE NSW Sydney Metro located on Abercrombie Street. It has been a centre for contemporary visual and performing arts and Aboriginal studies since it was established in July 1984. The building formerly housed the British United Shoe Machine Co.

== Sports ==
Sydney University Sports and Aquatic Centre features swimming, tennis, basketball, gymnasium facilities. Victoria Park Pool and fitness centre is also located nearby in Victoria Park. Prince Alfred Park is located on Cleveland Street and has tennis, basketball and a newly refurbished swimming pool. A Seido Karate club is located on Abercrombie Street.

== Arts ==
=== Carriageworks ===
The former Eveleigh Carriage Workshops is now Carriageworks, a centre for the nurturing, development and presentation of contemporary arts. It contains theatre, rehearsal and workshop spaces, a gallery and other facilities. Carriageworks is located off Wilson Street and is part of the adjacent suburb of Eveleigh. The Anna Schwartz Gallery is located on Wilson St within the Carriageworks complex.

=== Tin Sheds ===
Tin Sheds Gallery on City Road is a contemporary exhibition space located within the Faculty of Architecture, Design and Planning at the University of Sydney.

=== Other galleries ===
The Sheffer Gallery on Lander St supports challenging art from unrepresented artists, off-site exhibitions by other galleries and curators, and other art-related events. The Pine Street Creative Arts Centre has a branch at the Darlington Activity Centre on Shepherd Street. Another nearby gallery is the White Rabbit Gallery in Balfour Street, Chippendale which houses one of the world's largest and most significant collections of contemporary Chinese art.

== Religion ==
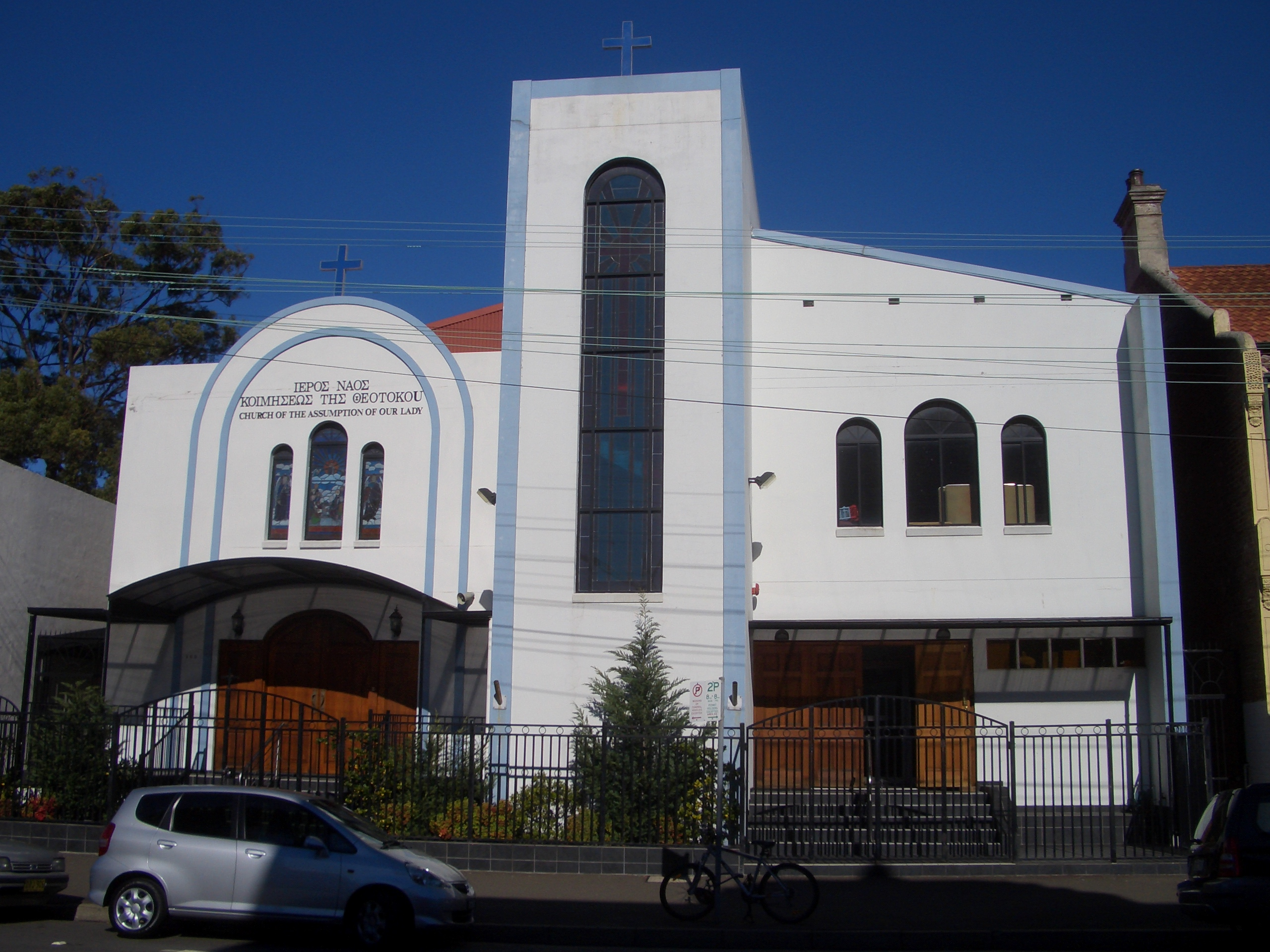
The Dormition of Our Lady, Greek Orthodox Church on Abercrombie Street

As described in Demographics, half of the residents of Darlington do not identify with a religion. However, there are several places of worship in the suburb, including the Greek Orthodox Parish and Community of "The Dormition of Our Lady" on Abercrombie Street, "St Michael and all the Angels" Melkite Cathedral on Golden Grove Street and the Portuguese Pentecostal Church on Abercrombie St.

== Transport ==
Darlington is served by buses on the City Road and Cleveland Street routes and the railway stations at Redfern and nearby Macdonaldtown.

== Darlington images ==
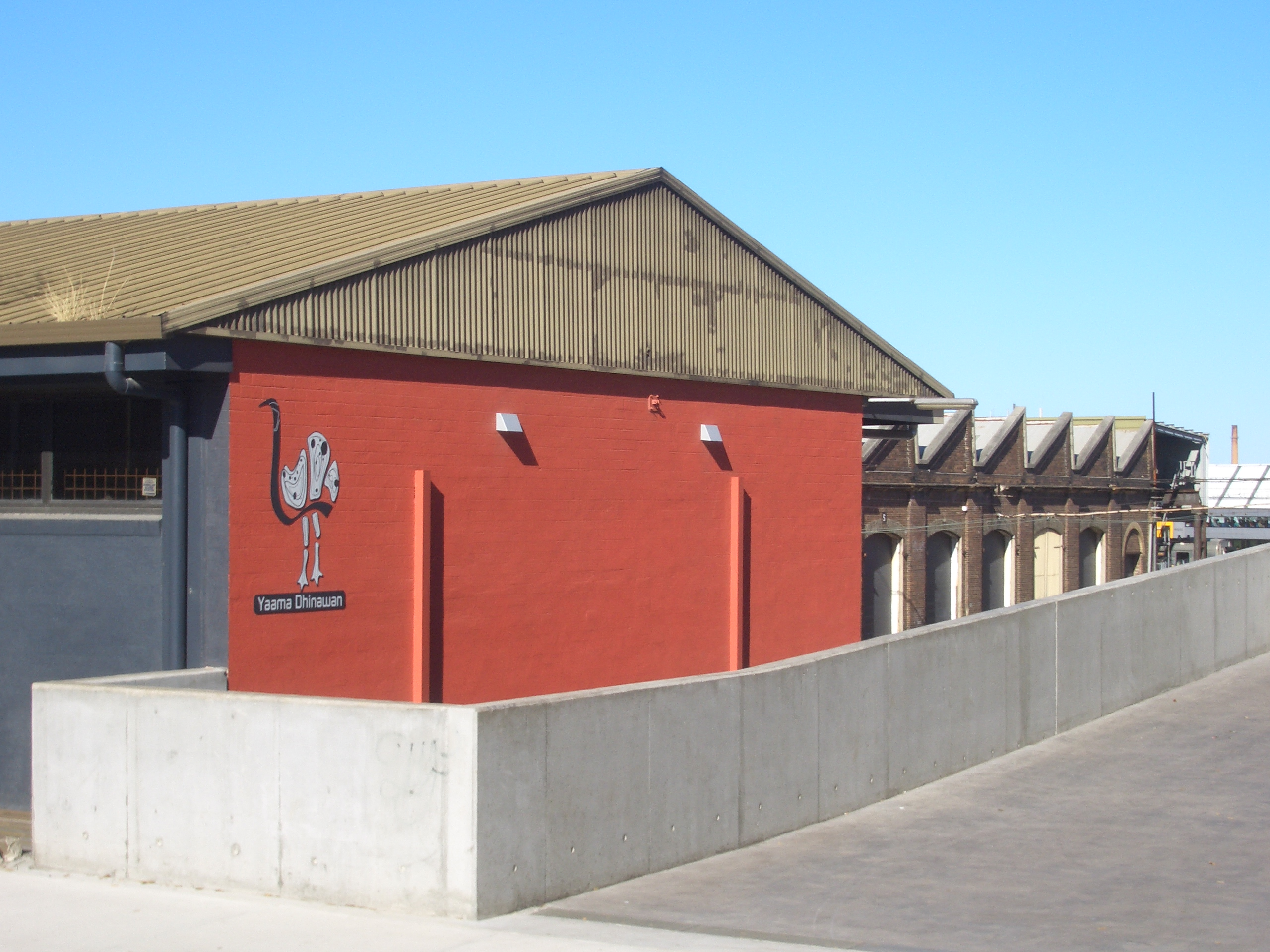
Yaama Dhinawan, Carriageworks demonstrates successful adaptive reuse of industrial space

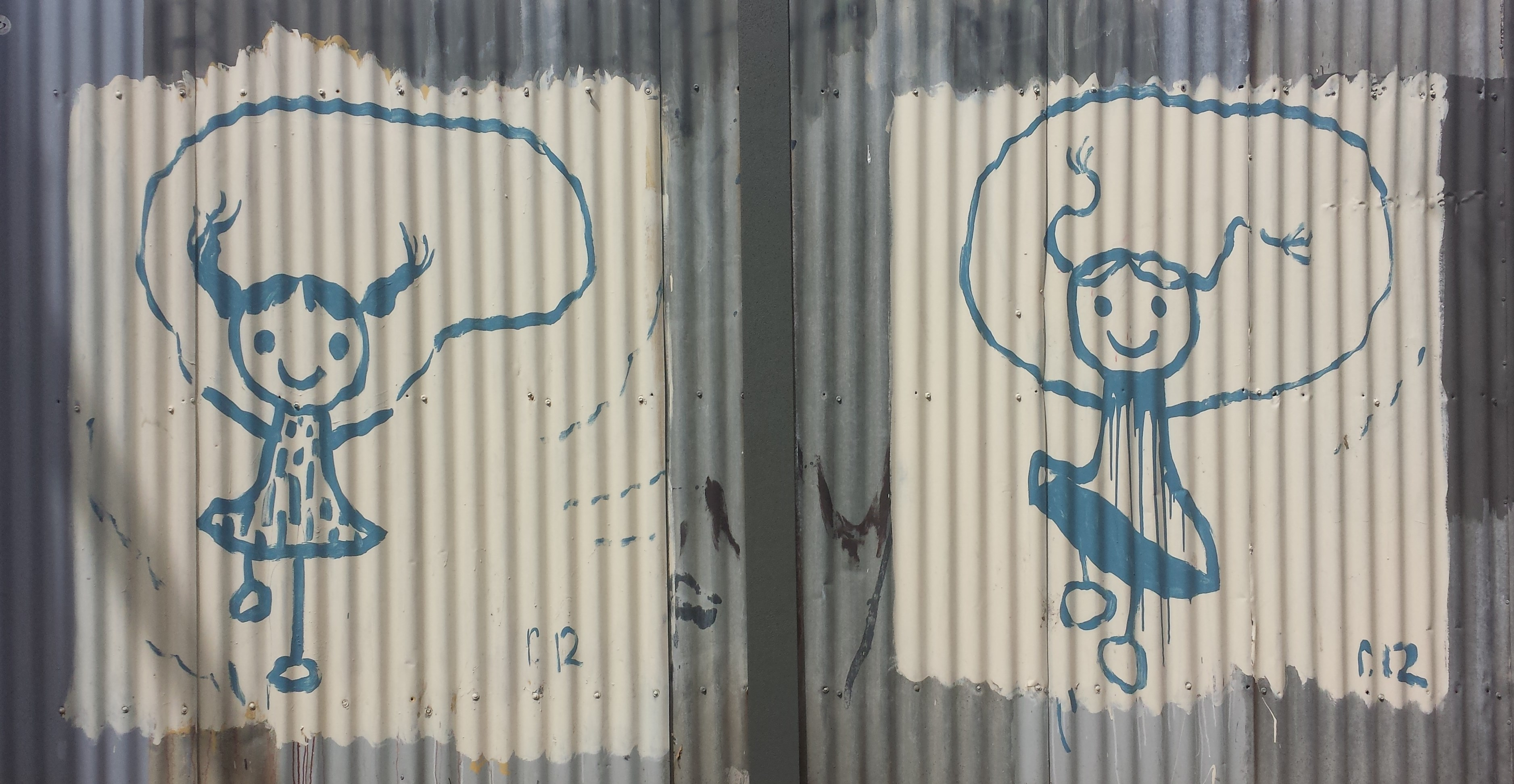
Skipping girls street art in Wilson Street

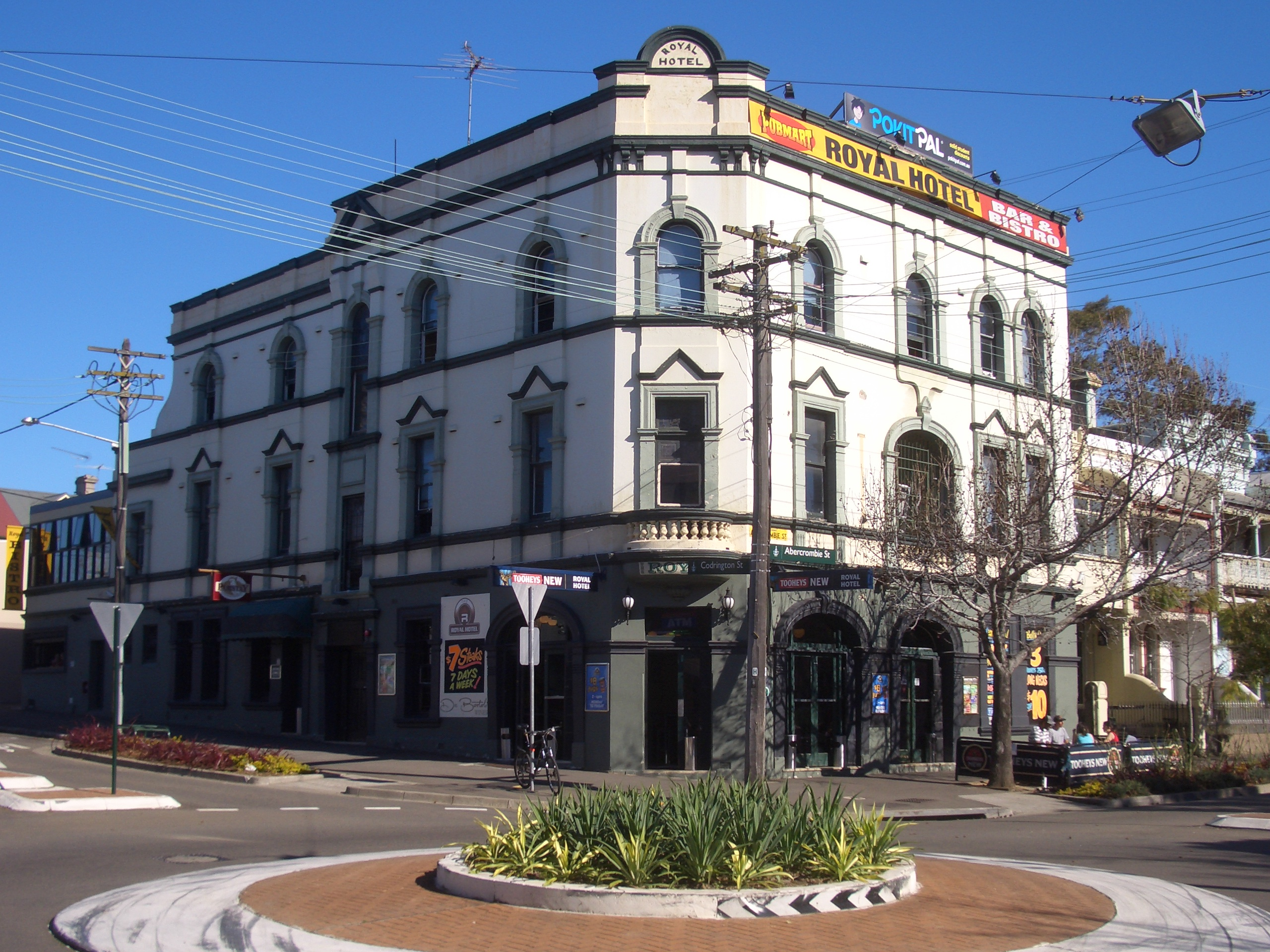
Royal Hotel Darlington on Abercrombie Street was built in 1894

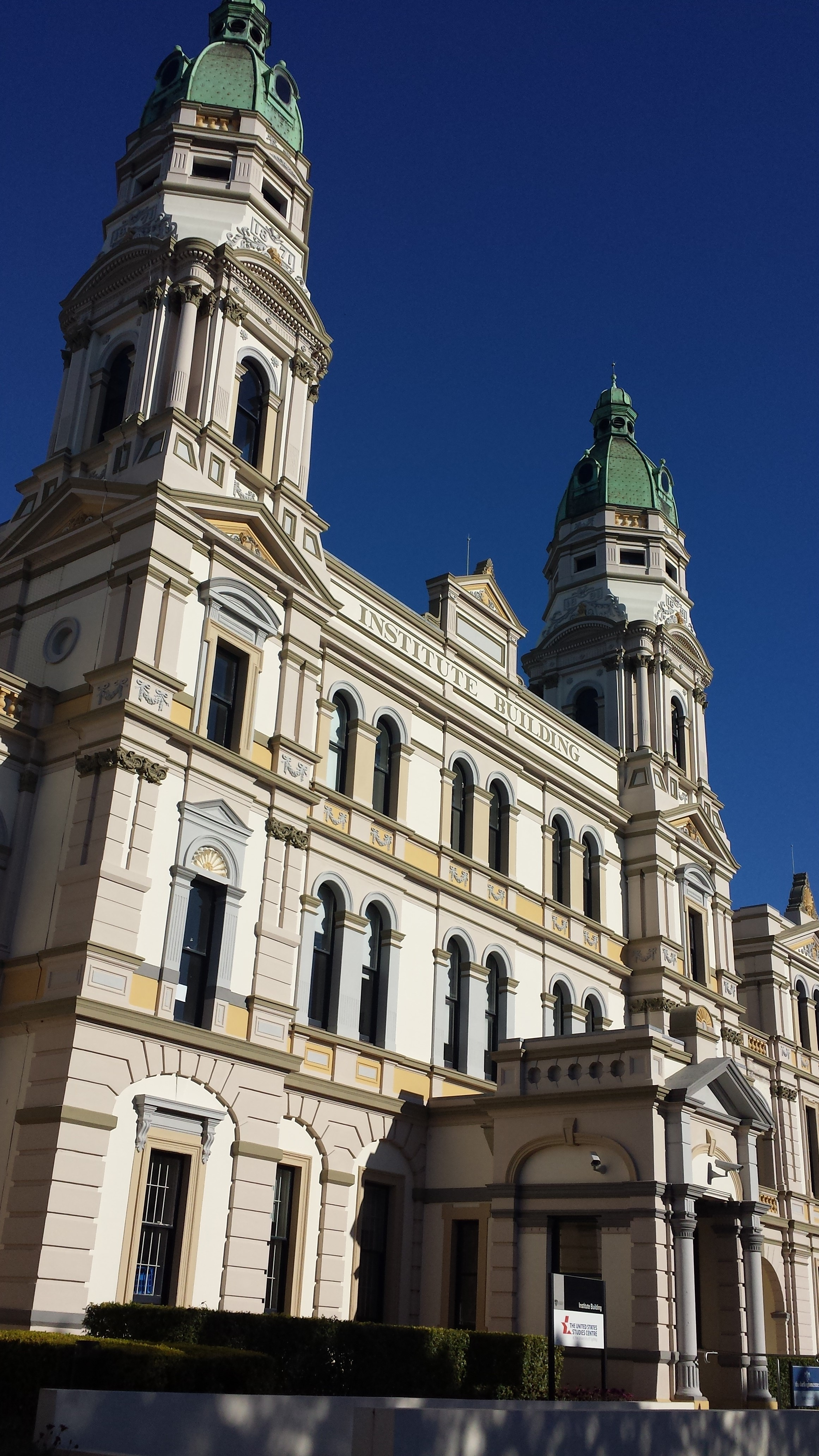
The former NSW Deaf Dumb and Blind Institute building now part of Sydney University

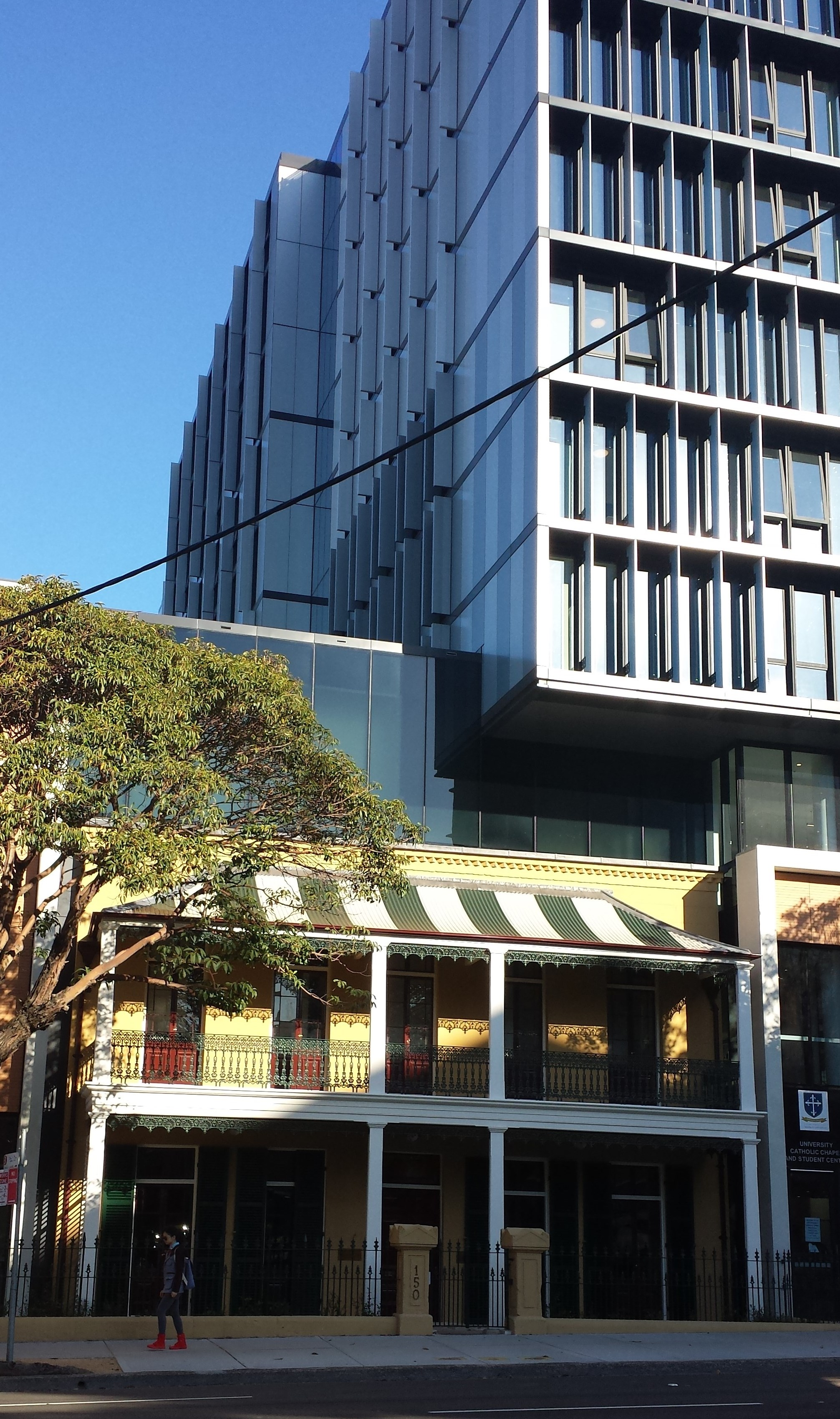
1859 Cypress Hall on City Road was recently rediscovered entombed within a 1929 Catholic chapel

=== Notable residents ===
- Alfred Shout VC
- Frank Burge, Rugby League footballer
- Eddie Ward, politician in the Labor Party
- James Robert Tyrrell, bookseller
