= David Scott Mitchell =

Australian book collector (1836–1907)

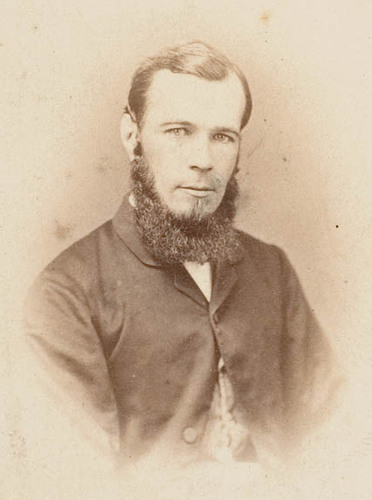
- David Scott Mitchell
- Born: 19 March 1836; Sydney
- Died: 24 July 1907 (aged 71); Sydney
- Occupation: Book collector
- Years active: 1866-1907
- Known for: Australiana Book and Manuscript Collection

David Scott Mitchell (19 March 1836 – 24 July 1907) was a collector of Australian books, founder and benefactor of the Mitchell Library, at the State Library of New South Wales, Sydney. Mitchell was buried in Rookwood Cemetery.

== Early life ==
In 1836 Mitchell was born in Sydney, the son of Dr James Mitchell and his wife Augusta Maria Frederick, née Scott. James and Augusta are commemorated by a window in the Garrison Church. David Mitchell was born at Sydney Hospital, grew up in Cumberland Street, Sydney and in October 1852, aged 16, became one of the first seven undergraduate students in the newly established University of Sydney in 1852. Mitchell won scholarships in mathematics and graduated B.A. in 1856 with honours in classics, and M.A. in 1859.

Mitchell was called to the bar, however he never practised law or any other profession. It was said that he declined the position of attorney-general. Mitchell assisted in the management of the Hunter River estates. Allegedly, he broke off a romance with Emily Matilda Manning, daughter of William Montagu Manning. Mitchell's father died in 1869. Publication of the family affairs was humiliating to a man of Mitchell's sensitive disposition.

== Book collector ==
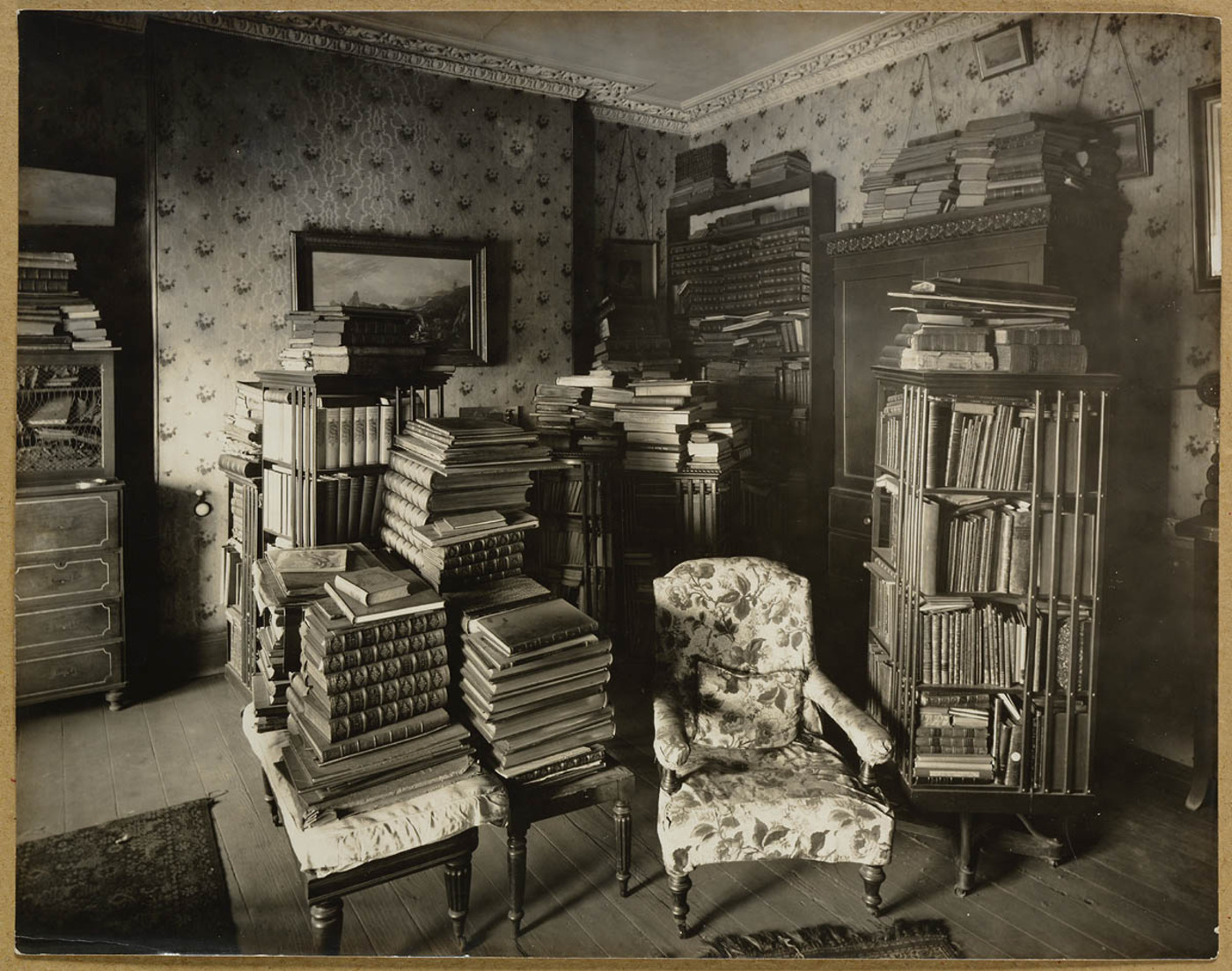
Bedroom, David Scott Mitchell's residence, Darlinghurst, Sydney, 1907.

In his search for books he was "largely indebted to the efforts of booksellers who knew Australiana, including George Robertson, Fred W. Wymark, William Dymock and James R. Tyrrell". Mitchell also purchased books from other collectors, most notably Mitchell purchased the 3,300-volume Australian collection of Alfred Lee in 1906.

... I give and bequeath to the Trustees of the Public Library of New South Wales all my books, pictures, engravings, coins, tokens, medals and manuscripts ... upon the trust and condition that the same shall be called and known as "The Mitchell Library" and shall be permanently arranged and kept for use in a special wing or set of rooms dedicated for that purpose...

— Extract from will of David Scott Mitchell

== Other activities ==
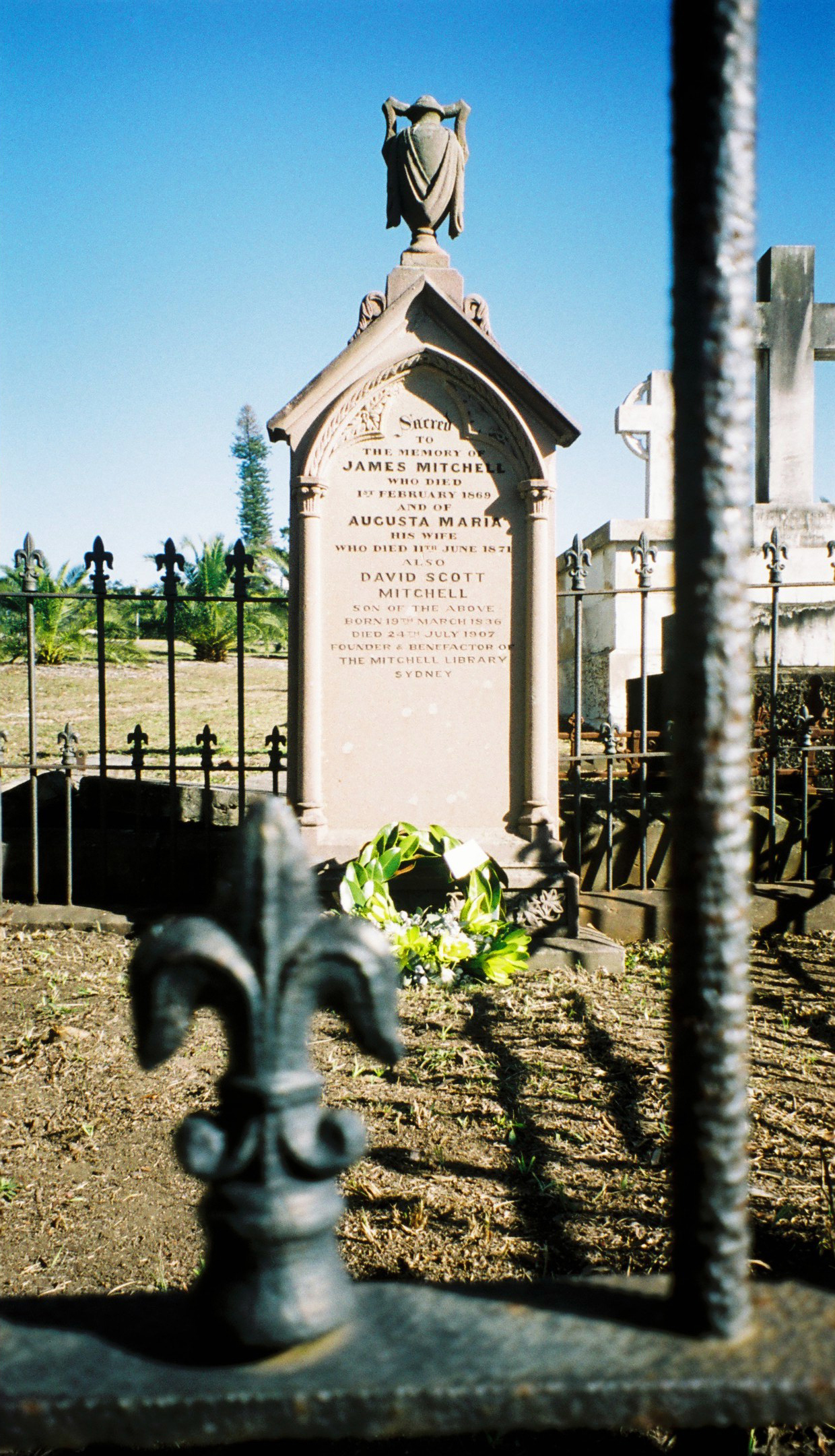
Mitchell's grave at Rookwood Cemetery

Mitchell was the first patron of the Royal Australian Historical Society in 1901.

== See also ==
- Angus & Robertson
- William Dixson
