= William Dymock =

Australian bookseller and publisher

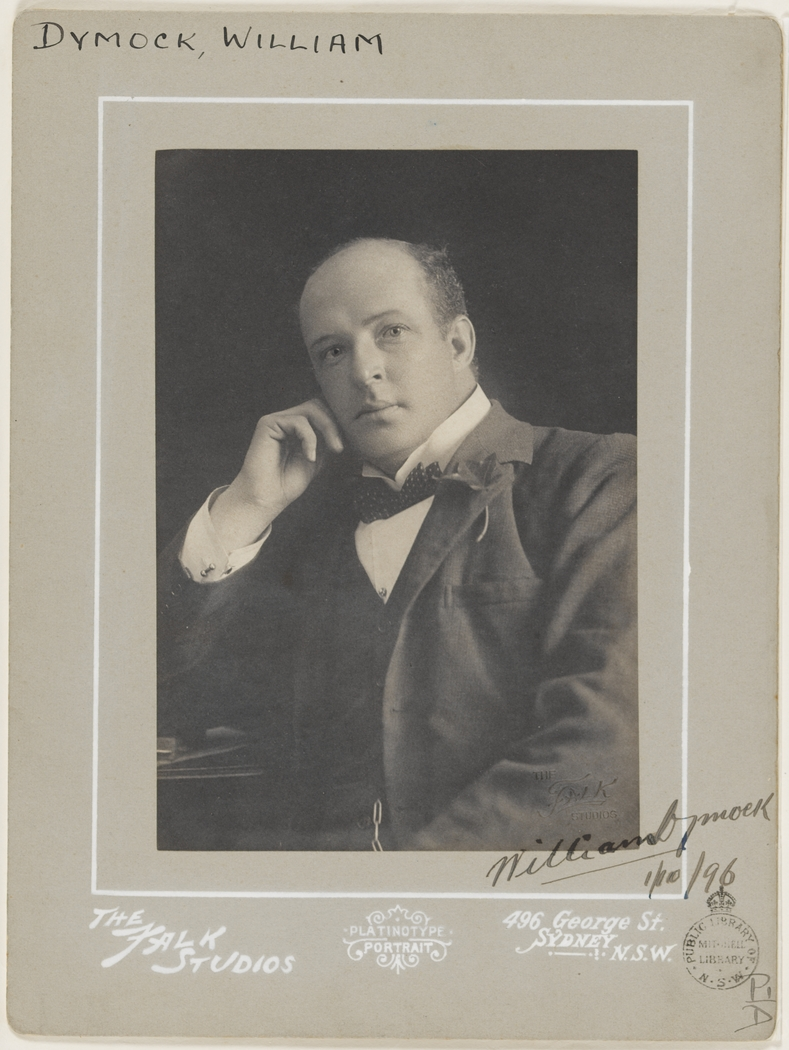
- Dymock in 1896
- Born: 11 May 1861; North Melbourne, Victoria, Australia
- Died: 5 October 1900 (aged 39); Sydney, New South Wales, Australia
- Occupation: Bookseller

William Dymock (11 May 1861 – 5 October 1900) was an Australian bookseller and publisher. He was the "first native-born Australian to launch and maintain a successful bookselling venture".

== Early life and career ==
William Dymock was born in North Melbourne, Victoria, on 11 May 1861. His parents, both immigrants from Scotland, were Walter Dymock, a wheelwright, and Janet, née McFarlane. While still a child, he moved to Redfern, in Sydney, New South Wales with his family.

After attending the Cleveland Street Public School, he entered the booktrade, working successively for John Andrews in Pitt Street as an apprentice, then for James Reading and Company, and finally for George Robertson and Company.

== Dymock's Book Arcade ==
Following a visit to England where he studied the booktrade and met the bookseller and collector Bernard Quaritch, Dymock returned to Sydney and in the early 1880s set up a bookshop with the name of the Dymock's Book Arcade. He took over several book firms including The Picturesque Atlas Publishing Company and, in 1896, Maddock's circulating library. He maintained the lending library as a part of Dymock's until at least the 1930s.

The Dymock's Book Arcade traded at a number of addresses in the Sydney CBD, including at 208 Pitt Street, and then at 142 King Street and finally, from 1890, at 428 George Street where it is still located. The Dymock's Book Arcade grew considerably in size. Its George Street location was "200 ft (61 m) by 30 ft (9 m)" in size and it was described in advertisements as "the largest Book Shop in the world" offering "upwards of one million books".

Dymock sold books both to the general public as well to sophisticated book collectors such as David Scott Mitchell and Alfred Lee. He sold both new and antiquarian books and advertised his role as a Quaritch agent. In the course of business he acquired a number of important libraries of antiquarian books, including those of Sir George Wigram Allen and Dr George Bennett. Mitchell has been credited with drawing Dymock's "attention to the value of old Australian books from the commercial standpoint", a piece of advice which helped the latter "in building up his business".

In 1886 he began a publishing programme, with his early publications including views of Sydney.

== Public service ==
In December 1898 Dymock stood for election in Sydney Municipal Council elections on behalf of the Citizens' Reform Committee. He defeated Sydney Burdekin and was elected as the Alderman for the Macquarie Ward, a position he would hold until October 1900.

In 1900 he gave evidence before the Legislative Assembly select committee on the working of the Sydney Free Public Library. During this enquiry antagonisms became evident between Dymock and the rival book firm Angus & Robertson on one hand and between Dymock and the Free Public Library's Principal Librarian, H. C. L. Anderson, on the other hand. Dymock "accused Anderson of unduly favoring Angus & Robertson as suppliers to the library, and of accepting tenders from his even though they were uncompetitive". Anderson defended himself from these charges.

Furthermore, Anderson accused Dymock of recommending "trashy" material to the municipal libraries he supplied, including "slang dictionaries and 'worthless rubbish' by undesirable authors such as Fenimore Cooper, Mayne Reid and Smollett. In response, Dymocks was reported to have acknowledged that "he had indeed 'gone into a cheaper class of books', and was quite ready to supply 'labouring-class' reading needs as well as those of 'college-bred men'".

Dymock also argued that the Free Public Library should continue to supply itself through English book agents such as Trübner & Co. However, Anderson and Angus & Robertson replied that sourcing that English agents resulted in "intolerable delays in delivery" and the supply of works unsuitable for the Library, whereas Sydney booksellers could supply books efficiently and offered "a good stock of Australian titles".

== Personal life and death ==
Dymock was unmarried. He lived with his sister Marjory Forsyth and her husband John in Randwick. He was a Freemason and "a member of many social and sporting associations".

On 5 October 1900, at the age of 39 years, he died suddenly of an apoplectic seizure. Control of the bookshop passed to the Forsyth family, who expanded the business, which eventually became Dymocks Booksellers, Australia's largest franchise bookshop chain.
