= George Robertson (bookseller) =

Scottish-Australian businessman, bookseller and publisher

George Robertson (5 July 1825 – 23 March 1898) was a Scottish-Australian businessman as an early bookseller and publisher of Australian literature.

Robertson was born at Glasgow, Scotland. Around 1873 large premises were built in Little Collins Street, with provision for stationery, book-binding, lithography, etc., and branches were opened in Sydney, Adelaide, Brisbane and Auckland. Commencing January 1875 he published the quarterly magazine Melbourne Review whose contents consisted chiefly of essays of quality and diversity. The issue of July 1885 may have been the last. In 1891 a revival was announced, with Henry Gyles Turner as editor, and again published by George Robertson and Company, but it is not known if even one issue was printed.

He was married twice and had a large family. Robertson published such books as Gordon's Sea Spray and Smoke Drift (1867), Kendall's Leaves from Australian Forests (1869), and James Brunton Stephens' The Black Gin and other Poems (1873).
